= Human rights in the United States =

In the United States, human rights consists of a series of rights which are legally protected by the Constitution of the United States (particularly by the Bill of Rights), but other amendments also, particularly XIV and XIII, state constitutions, treaty and customary international law, legislation enacted by Congress and state legislatures, and state referendums and citizen's initiatives. The Federal Government has, through a ratified constitution, guaranteed unalienable rights to its citizens and (to some degree) non-citizens. These rights have evolved over time through constitutional amendments, legislation, and judicial precedent. Along with the rights themselves, the portion of the population which has been granted these rights has been expanded over time. Within the United States, federal courts have jurisdiction over international human rights laws.

The Freedom in the World index published by U.S. based NGO Freedom House lists the United States 59th out of 210 countries and territories for civil and political rights, with 83 out of 100 points as of 2023; the Press Freedom Index, published by Reporters Without Borders, put the U.S. 64th out of 180 countries in 2026, the Democracy Index, published by the Economist Intelligence Unit, classifies the United States as a "flawed democracy". Numerous human rights issues exist in the country, including discrimination and violence against LGBTQ people, anti-LGBTQ legislation, and limitations on abortion access. Issues surrounding Missing and Murdered Indigenous Women, asylum seekers, poverty, working class rights, foreign policy, and arbitrary arrest and detention are ongoing.

== History ==
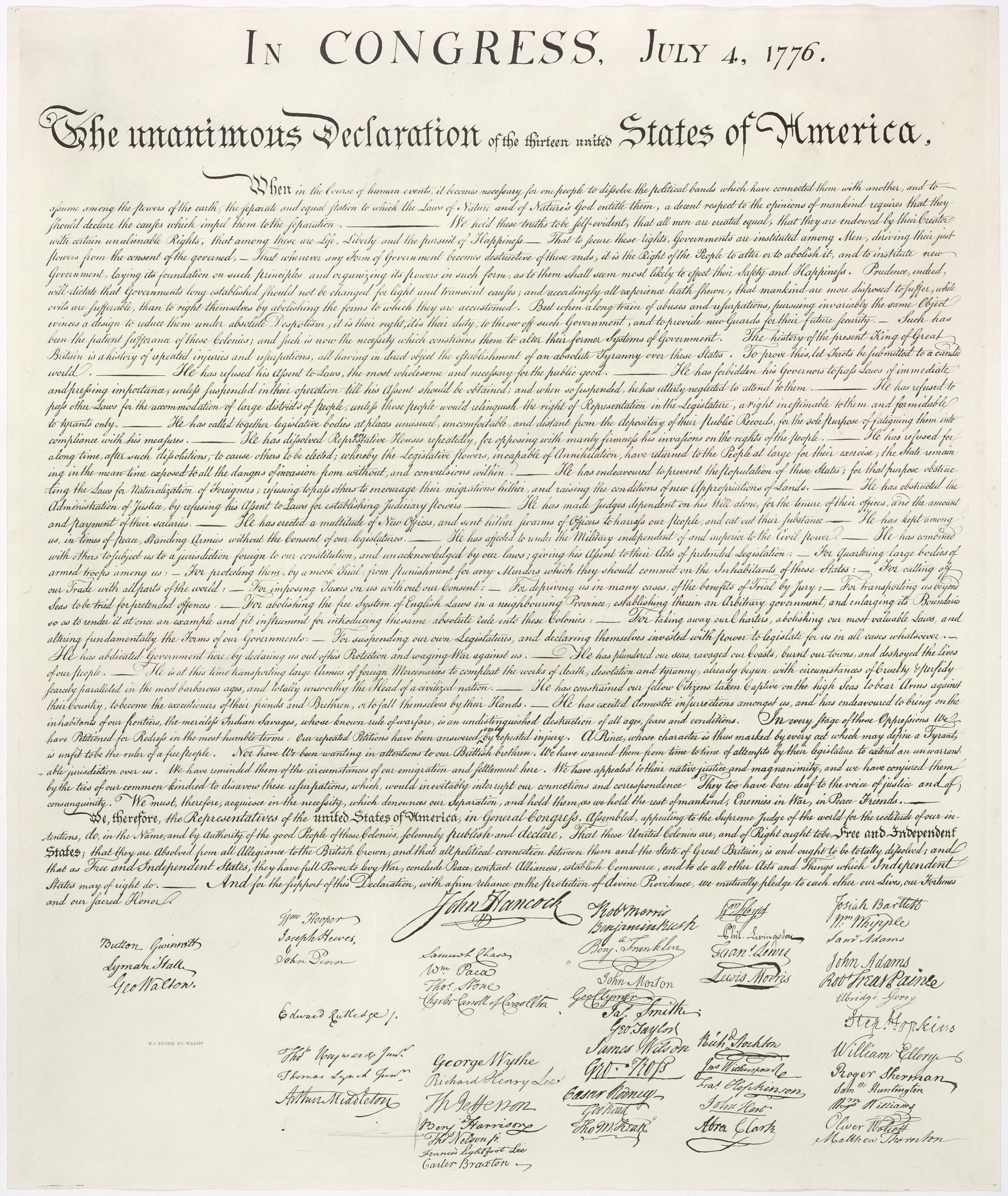
In 1776, Thomas Jefferson proposed a philosophy of human rights inherent to all people in the Declaration of Independence.

The first human rights organization in the Thirteen Colonies of British America, dedicated to the abolition of slavery, was formed by Anthony Benezet in 1775. A year later, the Declaration of Independence announced that the Thirteen Colonies regarded themselves as independent states, and no longer a part of the British Empire. The Declaration stated "that all men are created equal, that they are endowed by their Creator with certain unalienable Rights, that among these are Life, Liberty and the pursuit of Happiness", echoing John Locke's phrase "life, liberty, and property". This view of human liberties, which originated from the European Age of Enlightenment, postulates that fundamental rights are not granted by a divine or supernatural being to monarchs who then grant them to subjects, but are granted by a divine or supernatural being to each man (but not woman) and are inalienable and inherent.

After the Revolutionary War, the former thirteen colonies went through a pre-government phase of more than a decade, with much debate about the form of government they would have. The United States Constitution, adopted in 1787 through ratification at a national convention and conventions in the colonies, created a republic that guaranteed several rights and civil liberties. However, it did not extend voting rights in the United States beyond white male property owners (about 6% of the population). The Constitution referred to "Persons", not "Men" as was used in the Declaration of Independence. It also omitted any reference to terms such as a "Creator" or "God" and any authority derived or divined therefrom, and allowed "affirmation" in lieu of an "oath" if preferred. The Constitution guaranteed rights and provided that they belonged to all Persons (presumably meaning men and women, and perhaps children, although the developmental distinction between children and adults poses issues and has been the subject of subsequent amendments, as discussed below). Some of this conceptualization may have arisen from the significant Quaker segment of the population in the colonies, especially in the Delaware Valley, and their religious views that all human beings, regardless of sex, age, race, or other characteristics, had the same Inner light. Quaker and Quaker-derived views would have informed the drafting and ratification of the Constitution, including the direct influence of some of the Framers of the Constitution, such as John Dickinson and Thomas Mifflin, who were either Quakers themselves or came from regions which were either founded or heavily populated by Quakers.

Dickinson, Mifflin, and other Framers who objected to slavery were outvoted on that question, however, and the original Constitution sanctioned slavery (although it was not based on either the race or any other characteristic of the slave) and, through the Three-Fifths Compromise, it counted slaves (who were not defined by race) as three-fifths of a Person for purposes of distribution of taxes and representation in the House of Representatives (although the slaves themselves were discriminated against in voting for such representatives).

As the new Constitution took effect in practice, concerns about individual liberties and the concentration of power at the federal level, gave rise to the amendment of the Constitution through the adoption of the Bill of Rights, the first ten amendments to the Constitution. However, this had little impact on judgements by the courts for the first 130 years after its ratification.

Courts and legislatures also began to vary in the interpretation of "Person", with some jurisdictions narrowing the meaning of "Person" to cover only people with property, only men, or only white men. For example, although women had been voting in some states, such as New Jersey, since the founding of the United States, and prior to that in the colonial era, other states denied them the vote. In 1756, Lydia Chapin Taft voted, casting a vote in the local town hall meeting in place of her deceased husband. In 1777, women lost the right to exercise their vote in New York; in 1780, women lost the right to exercise their vote in Massachusetts; and in 1784, women lost the right to exercise their vote in New Hampshire. From 1775 until 1807, the state constitution in New Jersey permitted all persons worth over fifty pounds (about $7,800 adjusted for inflation, with the election laws referring to the voters as "he or she") to vote; provided they had this property, free black men and single women regardless of race therefore had the vote until 1807, but not married women, who could have no independent claim to ownership of fifty pounds (anything they owned or earned belonged to their husbands by the Common law of Coverture). In 1790, the law was revised to specifically include women, but in 1807, the law was again revised to exclude them, an unconstitutional act since the state constitution specifically made any such change dependent on the general suffrage. See Women's suffrage in the United States. Through the doctrine of coverture, many states also denied married women the right to own property in their own name, although most allowed single women (widowed, divorced or never married) the "Person" status of men, sometimes pursuant to the common law concept of a femme sole. Over the years, a variety of claimants sought to assert that discrimination against women in voting, in property ownership, in occupational license, and other matters was unconstitutional given the Constitution's use of the term "Person", but the all-male courts did not give this fair hearing. See, e.g., Bradwell v. Illinois.

In the 1860s, after decades of conflict over southern states' continued practice of slavery, and northern states' outlawing it, the Civil War was fought, and in its aftermath the Constitution was amended to prohibit slavery and to prohibit states' denying rights granted in the Constitution. Among these amendments was the Fourteenth Amendment, which included an Equal Protection Clause which seemed to clarify that courts and states were prohibited in narrowing the meaning of "Persons". After the Fourteenth Amendment to the United States Constitution was adopted, Susan B. Anthony, buttressed by the equal protection language, voted. She was prosecuted for this, however, and ran into an all-male court ruling that women were not "Persons"; the court levied a fine but it was never collected.

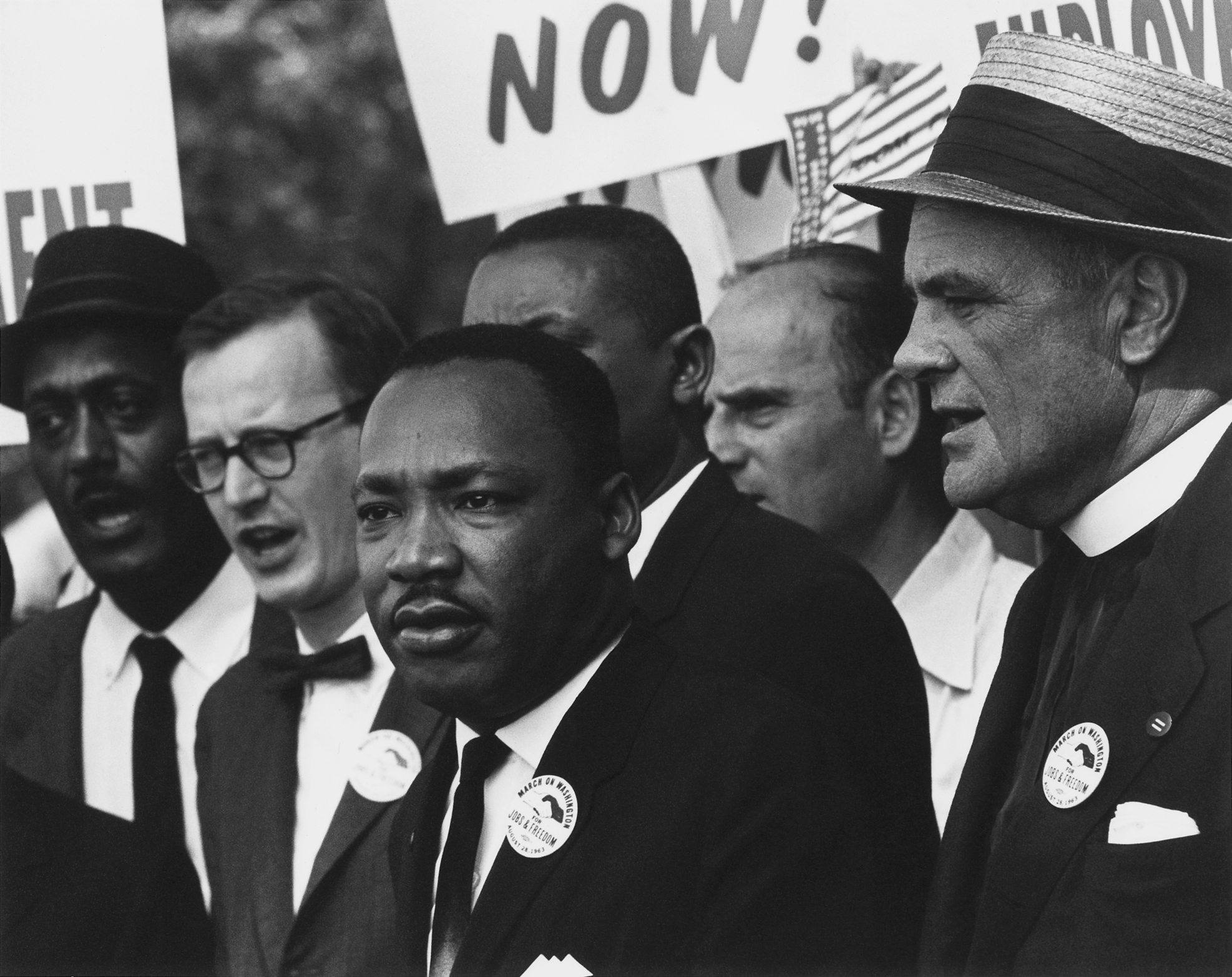
Martin Luther King Jr. at the 1963 Civil Rights March on Washington, D.C.

Fifty years later, in 1920, the Constitution was amended again, with the Nineteenth Amendment to definitively prohibit discrimination against women's suffrage.

In the 1970s, the Burger Court made a series of rulings clarifying that discrimination against women in the status of being Persons violated the Constitution and acknowledged that previous court rulings to the contrary had been sui generis and an abuse of power. The most often cited of these is Reed v. Reed, which held that any discrimination against either sex in the rights associated with Person status must meet a strict scrutiny standard.

The 1970s also saw the adoption of the Twenty-sixth Amendment, which prohibited discrimination on the basis of age, for Persons 18 years old and over, in voting. Other attempts to address the developmental distinction between children and adults in Person status and rights have been addressed mostly by the Supreme Court, with the Court recognizing in 2012, in Miller v. Alabama a political and biological principle that children are different from adults.

In 1945, the members of the United Nations organization completed the drafting of its founding text – the United Nations charter: The USA played a significant role in this process.

The Universal Declaration of Human Rights Drafting Committee was chaired by former First Lady Eleanor Roosevelt, who was known for her human rights advocacy. Similarly, for the United States government and its citizens, much remained uncertain about the future impact, force, and reach of international human rights. Eventually the United States had not yet developed a policy approach regarding whether or not it would recognize international human rights within a domestic context. Certainly there were already some domestic political attempts, as for example President Truman's Committee on Civil rights, which authored a report in 1947 initializing the possibility to apply the UN charter in order to combat racial discrimination in the US. Now that the United States had successfully adopted the UDHR, obviously it seemed like human rights would play a leading part in domestic law within the US. Still there was harsh controversy over the question whether to apply international law on a national basis. William H. Fitzpatrick won the Pulitzer Prize for editorial writing in 1951 for his editorials that repeatedly warned against international human rights overthrowing the supreme law of the land. Indeed, Fitzpatrick's concerns and motivations – as well as those of his readers – stood for the longstanding, bitter social and political struggles that divided much of the United States at the time, keeping in mind that in the 1940s and 1950s racial divisions, political exclusion, and gender inequalities were basic facts of American social life.

However, today there is little worry in the United States about the effect that human rights might have on its domestic law. Over the past few decades, the United States government has often held itself up as a strong supporter of human rights in the international arena. Nonetheless, in the view of the government human rights are still an international rather than a domestic phenomenon – representing more of choice than obligation.

Having today overcome many of the inequalities from more than half a dozen decades before, still the United States is in violation of the Declaration, in as much that "everyone has the right to leave any country" because the government may prevent the entry and exit of anyone from the United States for foreign policy, national security, or child support rearage reasons by revoking their passport. The United States is also in violation of the United Nations' human rights Convention on the Rights of the Child which requires both parents to have a relationship with the child. Conflict between the human rights of the child and those of a mother or father who wishes to leave the country without paying child support or doing the personal work of child care for his child can be considered to be a question of negative and positive rights.

== Legal framework ==
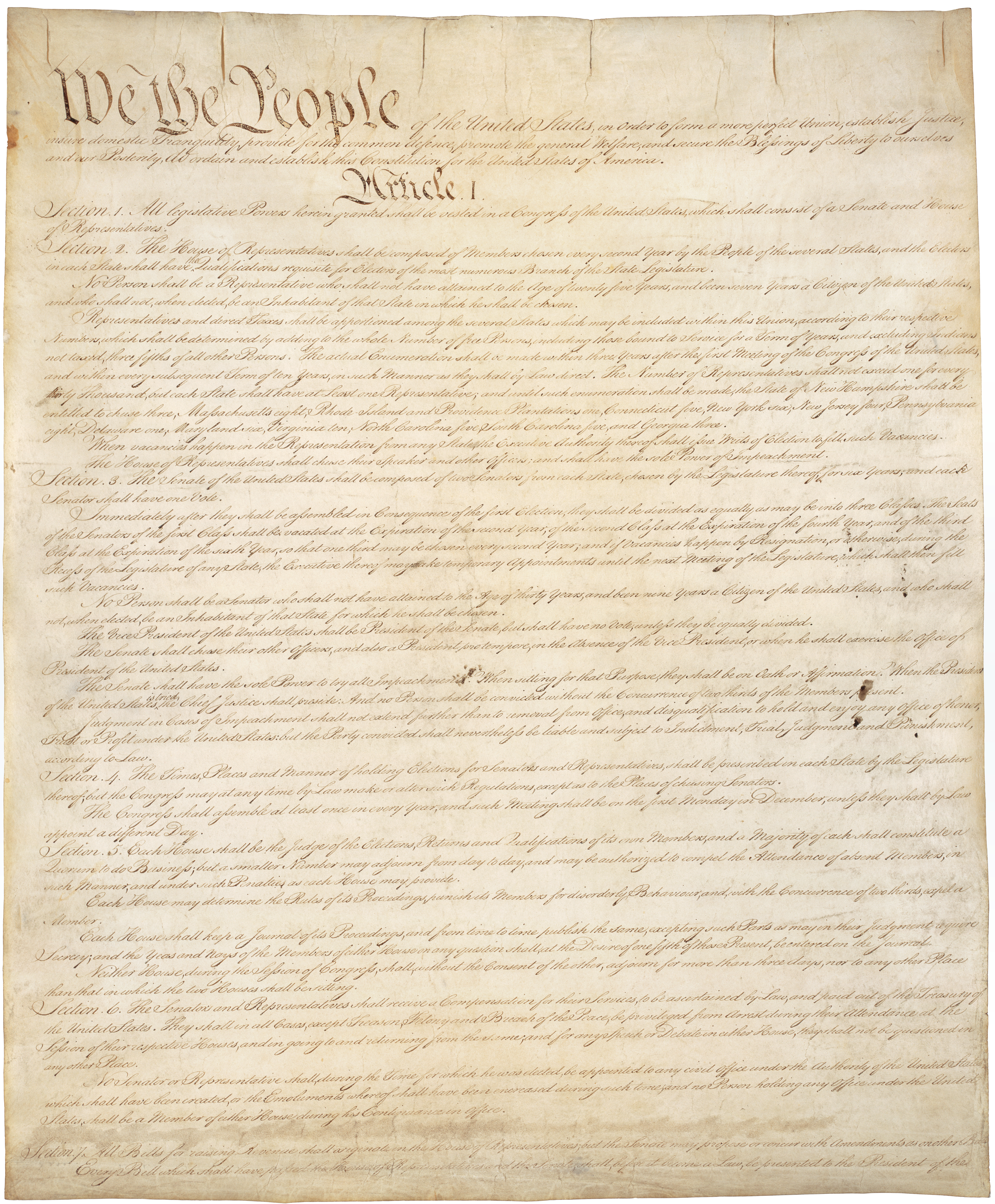
Original page of the United States Constitution

=== Domestic legal protection structure ===
According to Human Rights: The Essential Reference, "the American Declaration of Independence was the first civic document that met a modern definition of human rights." The Constitution recognizes a number of inalienable human rights, including freedom of speech, freedom of assembly, freedom of religion, the right to keep and bear arms, freedom from cruel and unusual punishment, and the right to a fair trial by jury.

Constitutional amendments have been enacted as the needs of the society evolved. The Ninth Amendment and Fourteenth Amendment recognized that not all human rights were enumerated in the original United States Constitution. The Civil Rights Act of 1964 and the Americans with Disabilities Act of 1990 are examples of human rights that were enumerated by Congress well after the Constitution's writing. The scope of the legal protections of human rights afforded by the US government is defined by case law, particularly by the precedent of the Supreme Court of the United States.

Within the federal government, the debate about what may or may not be an emerging human right is held in two forums: the United States Congress, which may enumerate these; and the Supreme Court, which may articulate rights that the law does not spell out. Additionally, individual states, through court action or legislation, have often protected human rights not recognized at federal level. For example, Massachusetts was the first of several states to recognize same sex marriage.

=== Effect of international treaties ===
In the context of human rights and treaties that recognize or create individual rights, U.S. constitutional law makes a distinction between self-executing and non-self-executing treaties. Non-self-executing treaties, which ascribe rights that under the constitution may be assigned by law, require legislative action to execute the contract (treaty) before it becomes a part of domestic law. There are also cases that explicitly require legislative approval according to the Constitution, such as cases that could commit the U.S. to declare war or appropriate funds.

Treaties regarding human rights, which create a duty to refrain from acting in a particular manner or confer specific rights, are generally held to be self-executing, requiring no further legislative action. In cases where legislative bodies refuse to recognize otherwise self-executing treaties by declaring them to be non-self-executing in an act of legislative non-recognition, constitutional scholars argue that such acts violate the separation of powers—in cases of controversy, the judiciary, not Congress, has the authority under Article III to apply treaty law to cases before the court. This is a key provision in cases where Congress declares a human rights treaty to be non-self-executing, for example, by contending it does not add anything to human rights under U.S. domestic law. The International Covenant on Civil and Political Rights is one such case, which, while ratified after more than two decades of inaction, was done so with reservations, understandings, and declarations.

Under the principle of pacta sunt servanda, a country may not invoke provisions of its domestic laws or constitution as justification for failure to comply with its international law obligations. Therefore, if a human rights treaty has been ratified by the U.S. but is not considered self-executing, or has not yet been implemented by legislation, it is nonetheless binding on the U.S. government as a matter of international law.

== Equality ==
=== Racial ===
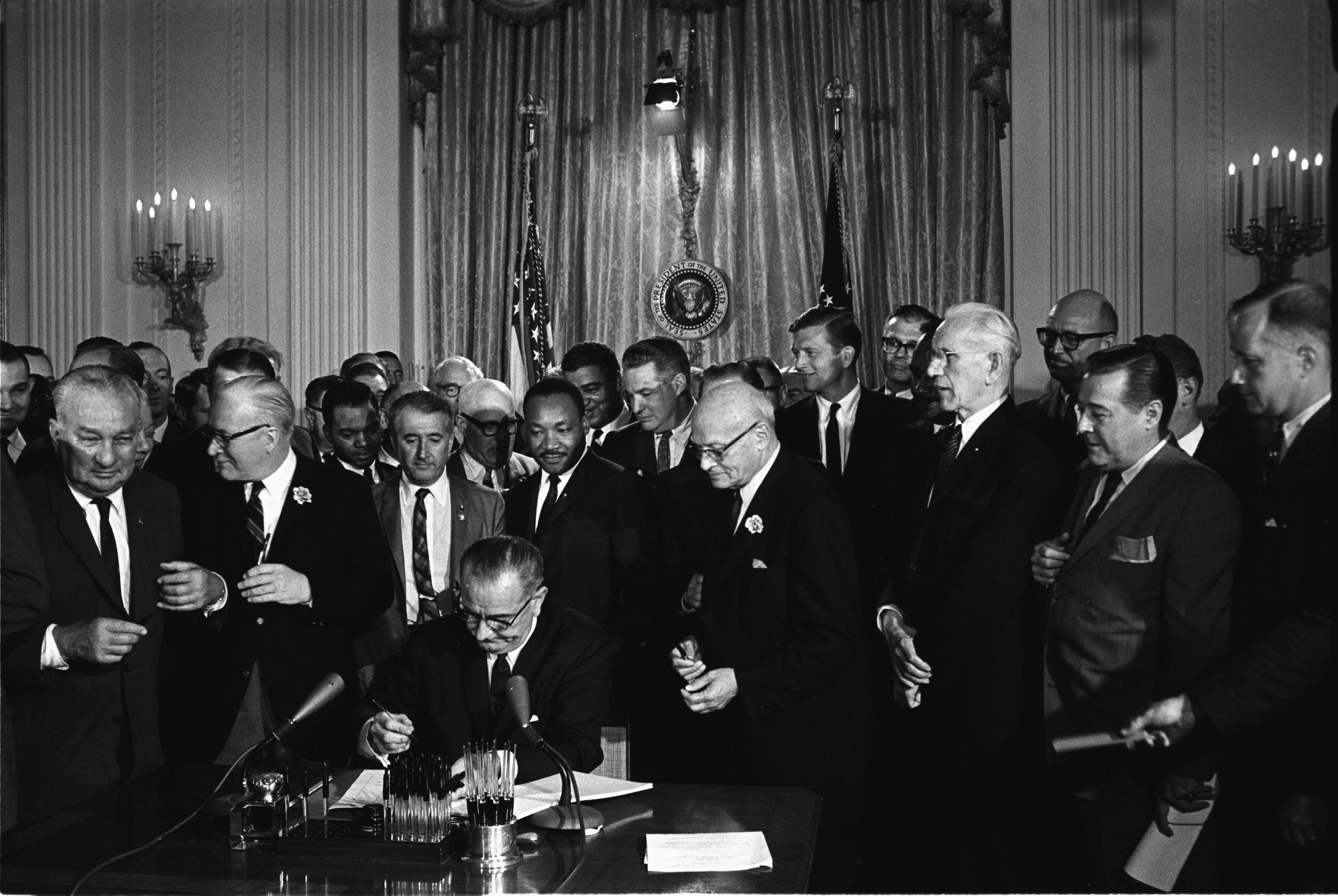
Lyndon B. Johnson signs the Civil Rights Act of 1964. Among the guests behind him is Martin Luther King Jr.

The Equal Protection Clause of the Fourteenth Amendment to the United States Constitution guarantees that "All persons born or naturalized in the United States ... are citizens of the United States and of the State wherein they reside. No State shall ... deny to any person within its jurisdiction the equal protection of the laws" In addition, the Fifteenth Amendment to the United States Constitution prohibits the denial of a citizen of the right to vote based on that citizen's "race, color, or previous condition of servitude".

The United States has enacted comprehensive legislation prohibiting discrimination on the basis of race and national origin in the workplace in the Civil Rights Act of 1964 (CRA). The CRA is perhaps the most prominent civil rights legislation enacted in modern times, has served as a model for subsequent anti-discrimination laws and has greatly expanded civil rights protections in a wide variety of settings. The 1991 provision created recourse for victims of such discrimination for punitive damages and full back pay. In addition to individual civil recourse, the United States possesses anti-discrimination government enforcement bodies, such as the Equal Employment Opportunity Commission.

Beginning in 1965, the United States also began a program of affirmative action that requires employers both not to discriminate and to provide preferences for groups protected under the Civil Rights Act that are judged to be underrepresented.

The United States also prohibits the imposition of any "... voting qualification or prerequisite to voting, or standard, practice, or procedure ... to deny or abridge the right of any citizen of the United States to vote on account of race or color," which prevents the use of grandfather clauses, literacy tests, poll taxes and white primaries.

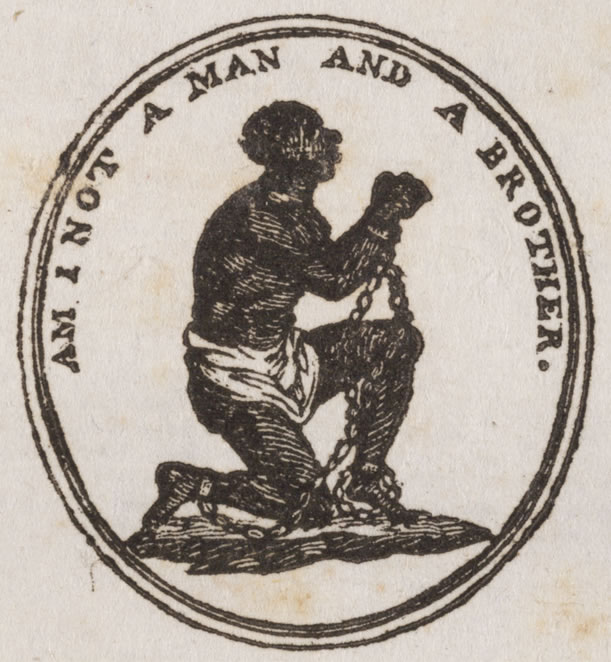
Abolitionist Anthony Benezet and others formed the Pennsylvania Abolition Society. This image was used as a symbol for their cause.

Prior to the passage of the Thirteenth Amendment to the United States Constitution, slavery was legal in some states of the United States until 1865. Influenced by the principles of the Religious Society of Friends, Anthony Benezet formed the Pennsylvania Abolition Society in 1775, believing that all ethnic groups were considered equal and human slavery was incompatible with Christian beliefs. Benezet extended the recognition of human rights to Native Americans and argued for a peaceful solution to the violence between Native and European Americans. Benjamin Franklin became the president of Benezet's abolition society in the late 18th century. In addition, the Fourteenth Amendment was interpreted to permit what was termed Separate but equal treatment of minorities until the United States Supreme Court overturned this interpretation in 1954, which consequently overturned Jim Crow laws. Native Americans did not have citizenship rights until the Dawes Act of 1887 and the Indian Citizenship Act of 1924.

Following the 2008 presidential election, Barack Obama was sworn in as the first African-American president of the United States on January 20, 2009. In his Inaugural Address, President Obama stated "A man whose father less than 60 years ago might not have been served at a local restaurant can now stand before you to take a most sacred oath ... So let us mark this day with remembrance, of who we are and how far we have traveled".

=== Sex ===
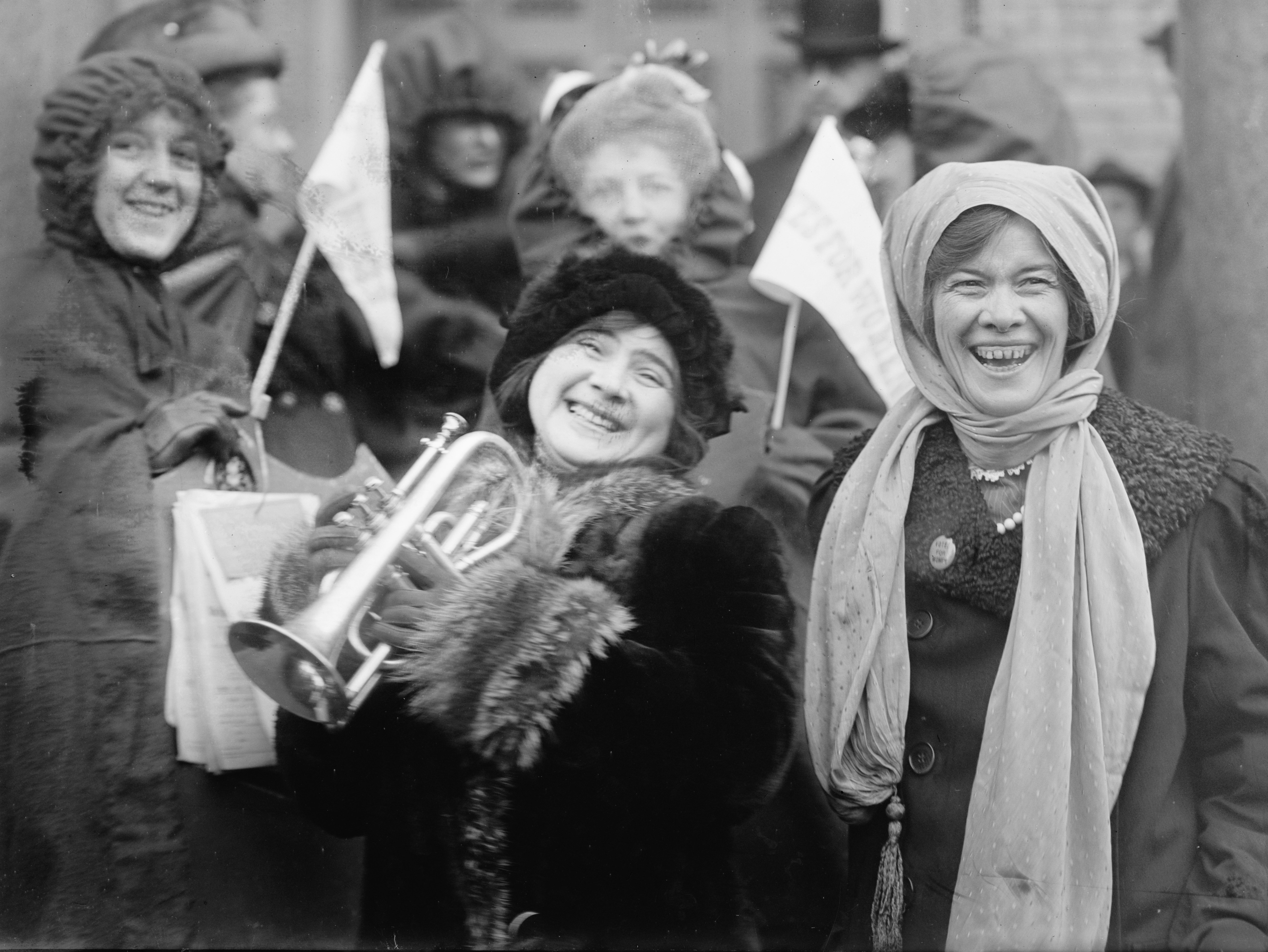
U.S. women suffragists demonstrating for the right to vote, February 1913

The Nineteenth Amendment to the United States Constitution prohibits the states and the federal government from denying any citizen the right to vote because of that citizen's sex. While this does not necessarily guarantee all women the right to vote, as suffrage qualifications are determined by individual states, it does mean that states' suffrage qualifications may not prevent women from voting due to their gender.

The 1964 CRA prohibits discrimination on the basis of gender. A 1991 provision created recourse for discrimination victims for punitive damages and full back pay. The Equal Employment Opportunity Commission also provides recourse for workplace discrimination victims. The United States has legally defined sexual harassment in the workplace. Because sexual harassment is therefore a Civil Rights violation, individual legal rights of those harassed in the workplace exist in the United States.

The U.N. Convention on the Elimination of All Forms of Discrimination Against Women, known as CEDAW has been signed by the United States, but it has not been ratified by the Senate. An investigation by a UN Working Group on discrimination against women in law and practice associated with the Office of the UN High Commissioner for Human Rights (OHCHR) found that “The US, which is a leading State in formulating international human rights standards, is allowing its women to lag behind”.

According to a 2019 report by Human Rights Watch, the patchwork of healthcare coverage in the first Trump administration caused the loss of insurance for many women and girls who are at risk of deadly diseases such as gynecological cancer.

In June 2022, the U.S. Supreme Court eliminated the constitutional right to an abortion, allowing states to criminalize the procedure. As of March 2023, 12 states have outlawed abortion after 6 weeks (before most women know they are pregnant), with several other state bans currently tied up in litigation. As of 2023, 1 in 3 American women live in states without abortion access. The decision received international condemnation.

The United States is the one of only six countries in the world that does not guarantee paid maternity leave to new mothers. A study of the 40 OECD countries ranked the United States the worst for paid maternity leave.

The United States has the highest maternal mortality rate in the developed world, with a rate of nearly 33 maternal deaths per 100,000 live births. The rate rose nearly 40% in 2021 and has more than quadrupled since the 1990s.

The United States has the highest female incarceration rate in the world, housing nearly one-third of the world's female prisoners. It is alleged that as many as 80% of female U.S. inmates have experienced physical and/or sexual abuse.

=== Disability ===
The United States has adopted antidiscrimination legislation for people with disabilities, the Americans with Disabilities Act of 1990 (ADA). The ADA reflected a dramatic shift toward the employment of persons with disabilities to enhance the labor force participation of qualified persons with disabilities and to reduce their dependence on government entitlement programs. The ADA amends the CRA and permits plaintiffs to recover punitive damages. The ADA has been instrumental in the evolution of disability discrimination law in the United States. Although ADA Title I was found to be unconstitutional, the Supreme Court has extended the protection to people with Acquired immune deficiency syndrome (AIDS).

Federal benefits such as Social Security Disability Insurance (SSDI) and Supplemental Security Income (SSI) are often administratively viewed in the United States as being primarily or near-exclusively the entitlement only of impoverished U.S. people with disabilities, and not applicable to those with disabilities who make significantly above-poverty level income. This is proven in practice by the general fact that in the U.S., a disabled person on SSI without significant employment income who is suddenly employed, with a salary or wage at or above the living wage threshold, often discovers that government benefits they were previously entitled to have ceased, because supposedly the new job "invalidates" the need for this assistance. However, the Stephen Beck Jr. Achieving a Better Life Experience Act of 2014 (the ABLE Act) amended Section 529 of the Internal Revenue Service Code of 1986 to create tax-free savings accounts (ABLE accounts) for qualified expenses, and with these accounts (each person may have only one account) people with disabilities who have a condition that occurred before age 26 can save up to $100,000 without risking eligibility for Social Security and other government programs. They can also keep their Medicaid coverage no matter how much money they accrue in their ABLE account. Under current gift-tax limitations as of 2014, as much as $14,000 could be deposited annually. However, each state must put regulations in place so that financial institutions can make the ABLE accounts available, and there is no guarantee a particular state will do so.

=== LGBTQ ===
The United States federal government voted in the United Nations General Assembly in favor of all LGBTQ+ protection resolutions, including A/RES/57/214, A/RES/59/197, abstained A/RES/61/173, A/RES/63/182, A/RES/65/208, A/RES/67/168, and in favor of A/RES/69/182. The United States federal government also voted in favor of the United Nations Human Rights Council A/HRC/RES/17/19. The United States federal government signed the United Nations 2006 and 2008 Joint Statements. The United States federal government voted in the United Nations Security Council in favor of SC/12399.

=== Intersex ===
According to the Human Rights Commission of the City and County of San Francisco, as of 2005, intersex people in the United States have faced non-consensual cosmetic medical interventions, violence and discrimination that violate their human rights. Actions by intersex civil society organizations aim to eliminate harmful practices, promote social acceptance, and equality. In 2016, some legal representation was granted when New York state issued the nation's first intersex birth certificate.

=== Privacy ===
Privacy is not explicitly stated in the United States Constitution, though in Griswold v. Connecticut, the Supreme Court ruled that it is implied. The Supreme Court in Lawrence v. Texas 539 U.S. 558 (2003) established the right to sexual privacy. The US does not restrict the use of digital encryption among its citizens. The social purpose corporation Global Partners Digital ranks the US in the top category (Minimal Restrictions) for respecting the rights of individuals to use encryption.

=== Accused ===
The United States maintains a presumption of innocence in legal procedures. The Fourth, Fifth, Sixth and Eighth Amendments deal with the rights of criminal suspects. Later the protection was extended to civil cases as well. In Gideon v. Wainwright, the Supreme Court requires that indigent criminal defendants who are unable to afford their own attorney be provided counsel at trial. Since the Miranda v. Arizona decision in 1966, police departments are required to inform arrested persons of their rights, in a procedure called the Miranda warning.

== Freedoms ==
=== Freedom of religion ===
The Establishment Clause of the First Amendment prohibits the establishment of a national religion by Congress or the preference of one religion over another. The clause was used to limit school praying, beginning with Engel v. Vitale, which ruled government-led prayer unconstitutional. Wallace v. Jaffree banned moments of silence allocated for praying. The Supreme Court also ruled clergy-led prayer at public high school graduations unconstitutional with Lee v. Weisman.

The free exercise clause guarantees the free exercise of religion. The Supreme Court's Lemon v. Kurtzman decision established the "Lemon test" exception, which details the requirements for legislation concerning religion. In the Employment Division v. Smith decision, the Supreme Court maintained a "neutral law of general applicability" can be used to limit religion exercises. In the City of Boerne v. Flores decision, the Religious Freedom Restoration Act was struck down as exceeding congressional power; however, the decision's effect is limited by the Gonzales v. O Centro Espirita Beneficente Uniao do Vegetal decision, which requires states to express compelling interest in prohibiting illegal drug use in religious practices.

=== Freedom of expression ===
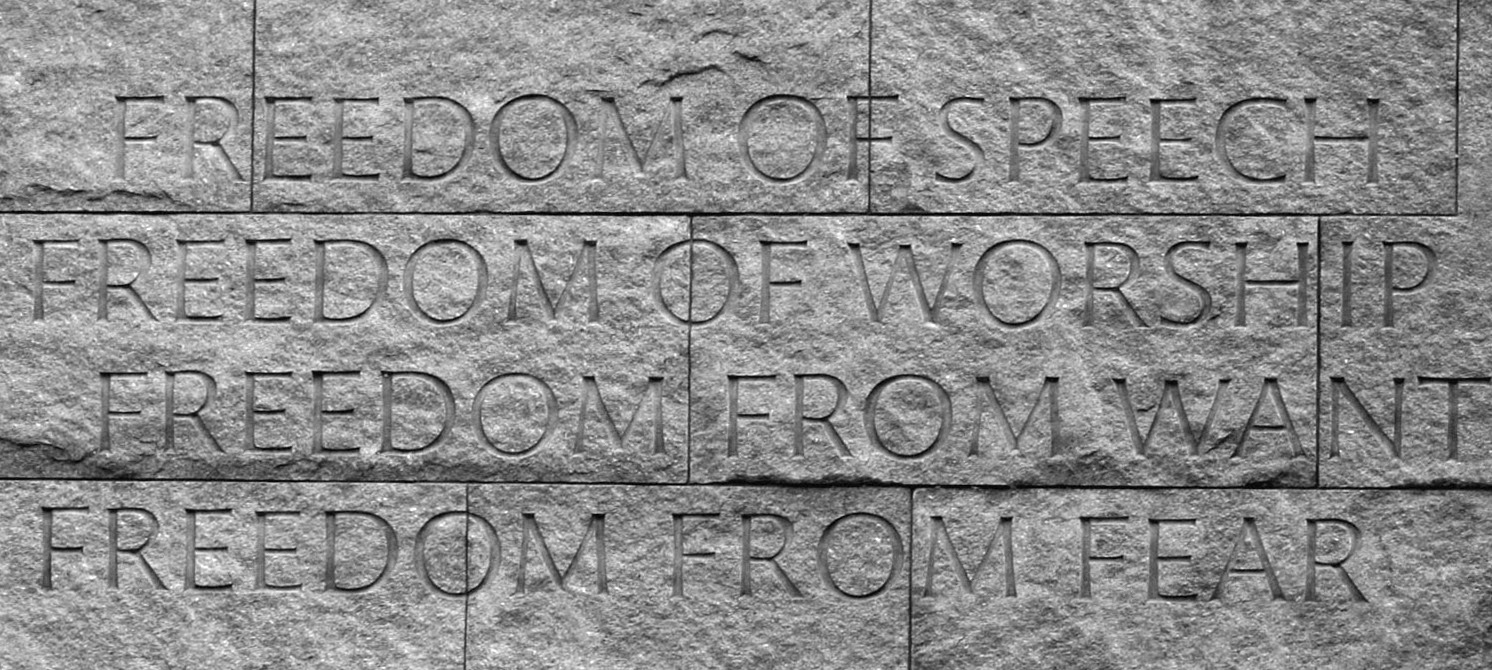
The Four Freedoms are derived from the 1941 State of the Union Address by United States President Franklin Roosevelt delivered to the 77th United States Congress on January 6, 1941. The theme was incorporated into the Atlantic Charter, and it became part of the charter of the United Nations and appears in the preamble of the United Nations Declaration of Human Rights.

The United States is a constitutional republic based on founding documents that restrict the power of government and preserve the liberty of the people. The freedom of expression (including speech, media, and public assembly) is an important right and is given special protection, as declared by the First Amendment of the constitution. Protections on freedom of speech within the United States are considered to be broad, even when compared with other liberal democracies. For example, in the United States, hate speech is constitutionally protected. According to Supreme Court precedent, the federal and lower governments may not apply prior restraint to expression, with certain exceptions, such as national security and obscenity. Legal limits on expression include:

- Solicitation, fraud, specific threats of violence, or disclosure of classified information.
- Civil offenses involving defamation, fraud, or workplace harassment.
- Copyright violations.
- Federal Communications Commission rules governing the use of broadcast media.
- Certain crimes involving obscenity.
- Ordinances requiring mass demonstrations on public property to register in advance. The government may not, however, deny registration to demonstrators on the basis of content.
- The use of free speech zones and protest free zones.
- Military censorship of blogs written by military personnel claiming some include sensitive information ineligible for release.

Some laws remain controversial due to concerns that they infringe on freedom of expression. These include the Digital Millennium Copyright Act and the Bipartisan Campaign Reform Act.

In two high-profile cases, grand juries have decided that Time magazine reporter Matthew Cooper and New York Times reporter Judith Miller must reveal their sources in cases involving CIA leaks. Time magazine exhausted its legal appeals, and Mr. Cooper eventually agreed to testify. Miller was jailed for 85 days before cooperating. U.S. District Chief Judge Thomas F. Hogan ruled that the First Amendment does not insulate Time magazine reporters from a requirement to testify before a criminal grand jury that's conducting the investigation into the possible illegal disclosure of classified information.

==== Right to peaceably assemble ====
Protesters have been arrested for protesting outside of designated "free speech zones". At the 2004 Republican National Convention in New York City, over 1,700 protesters were arrested.

On July 24, 2020, the United Nations human rights office urged U.S. security forces to limit their use of force against peaceful protesters and journalists, as clashes between federal agents and demonstrators continued in Portland, Oregon.

=== Freedom of movement ===
As per § 707(b) of the Foreign Relations Authorization Act, Fiscal Year 1979, United States passports are required to enter and exit the country, and as per the Passport Act of 1926 and Haig v. Agee, the Presidential administration may deny or revoke passports for foreign policy or national security reasons at any time. Perhaps the most notable example of enforcement of this ability was the 1948 denial of a passport to U.S. Representative Leo Isacson, who sought to go to Paris to attend a conference as an observer for the American Council for a Democratic Greece, a Communist front organization, because of the group's role in opposing the Greek government in the Greek Civil War.

The State Department refused to issue passports to citizens who declined to swear that they were not Communists. This practice was ended following the 1958 Supreme Court Case Kent v. Dulles.

The United States prevents U.S. citizens to travel to Cuba, citing national security reasons. The current exception to the ban on travel to the island, permitted since April 2009, has been an easing of travel restrictions for Cuban-Americans visiting their relatives. Restrictions continue to remain in place for the rest of the American populace.

On June 30, 2010, the American Civil Liberties Union filed a lawsuit on behalf of ten people who are either U.S. citizens or legal residents of the U.S., challenging the constitutionality of the government's "no-fly" list. The plaintiffs have not been told why they are on the list. Five of the plaintiffs have been stranded abroad. It is estimated that the "no-fly" list contained about 8,000 names at the time of the lawsuit.

=== Right to vote ===
The right to vote, also known as the right to suffrage, is implicitly guaranteed through a combination of constitutional (especially the Fifteenth, Nineteenth and Twenty-fourth amendments), statutory and judicial guarantees. Unlike the United States Constitution, the right to vote is affirmatively guaranteed in 49 state constitutions, while the Arizona state constitution negatively affirms the right to vote. However, voting rights are impacted by the variety of state laws regarding voting and voter registration.

=== Freedom of association ===
Freedom of association is the right of individuals to come together in groups for political action or to pursue common interests.

Between 1956 and 1971, the FBI attempted to "expose, disrupt, misdirect, discredit, or otherwise neutralize" left-wing and indigenous groups through the COINTELPRO program.

In 2008, the Maryland State Police admitted that they had added the names of Iraq War protesters and death penalty opponents to a terrorist database. They also admitted that other "protest groups" were added to the terrorist database, but did not specify which groups. It was also discovered that undercover troopers used aliases to infiltrate organizational meetings, rallies and group e-mail lists. Police admitted there was "no evidence whatsoever of any involvement in violent crime" by those classified as terrorists.

=== Right of revolution ===
The right of revolution is the right or duty of the people of a nation to overthrow a government that acts against their common interests, and is a traditional assumption in American political thought. The right to revolution played a large part in the writings of the American revolutionaries in the run up to the American Revolution. The political tract Common Sense used the concept as an argument for rejection of the British Monarchy and separation from the British Empire, as opposed to merely self-government within it. It was also cited in the Declaration of Independence of the United States, when a group of representatives from the various states signed a declaration of independence citing charges against King George III. As the American Declaration of Independence in 1776 expressed it, natural law taught that the people were "endowed by their Creator with certain unalienable Rights" and could alter or abolish government "destructive" of those rights.

=== National security exceptions ===
The United States government has declared martial law, suspended (or claimed exceptions to) some rights on national security grounds, typically in wartime and conflicts such as the United States Civil War, Cold War or the War against Terror. 70,000 Americans of Japanese ancestry were legally interned during World War II under Executive Order 9066. In some instances the federal courts have allowed these exceptions, while in others the courts have decided that the national security interest was insufficient. Presidents Lincoln, Wilson, and F.D. Roosevelt ignored such judicial decisions.

==== Historical restrictions ====
Sedition laws have sometimes placed restrictions on freedom of expression. The Alien and Sedition Acts, passed by President John Adams during an undeclared naval conflict with France, allowed the government to punish "false" statements about the government and to deport "dangerous" immigrants. The Federalist Party used these acts to harass many supporters of the Democratic-Republican Party. While Woodrow Wilson was president, broad legislation called the Espionage Act of 1917 and Sedition Act of 1918 were passed during World War I. Thousands were jailed for violations of these laws, which prohibited criticizing conscription and the government, or sending literature through the US Mail doing the same. Most prominently it led to the conviction of Socialist Party of America Presidential candidate Eugene V. Debs for encouraging young men to evade the draft when he spoke out against conscription. Debs received ten years in prison, and ran for president a third time while in prison. In late 1921, his sentence was commuted by President Warren G. Harding, releasing Debs early. Numerous conscientious objectors to conscription were also jailed. In the post-war Palmer Raids, foreign-born dissidents were arrested in the thousands without legal warrants, and deported for their political beliefs.

Presidents have claimed the power to imprison summarily, under military jurisdiction, those suspected of being combatants for states or groups at war against the United States. Abraham Lincoln invoked this power in the American Civil War to imprison Maryland secessionists. In that case, the Supreme Court concluded that only Congress could suspend the writ of habeas corpus, and the government released the detainees. During World War II against Japan, the United States government interned thousands of Japanese citizens living in the West Coast on fears that Japan might use them as saboteurs. The US Supreme Court upheld this policy. The Fourth Amendment of the United States Constitution forbids unreasonable search and seizure without a warrant, but some administrations have claimed exceptions to this rule to investigate alleged conspiracies against the government. During the Cold War, the Federal Bureau of Investigation established COINTELPRO to infiltrate and disrupt left-wing organizations, including those that supported the rights of black Americans.

==== Nationwide Suspicious Activity Reporting Initiative ====
The federal government has set up a data collection and storage network that keeps a wide variety of data on tens of thousands of Americans who have not been accused of committing a crime. Operated primarily under the direction of the Federal Bureau of Investigation, the program is known as the Nationwide Suspicious Activity Reporting Initiative or SAR. Reports of suspicious behavior noticed by local law enforcement or by private citizens are forwarded to the program, and profiles are constructed of the persons under suspicion. See also Fusion Center.

== Labor rights ==
Labor rights in the United States have been linked to basic constitutional rights. Comporting with the notion of creating an economy based upon highly skilled and high wage labor employed in a capital-intensive dynamic growth economy, the United States enacted laws mandating the right to a safe workplace, workers compensation, Unemployment insurance, fair labor standards, collective bargaining rights, Social Security, prohibiting child labor and guaranteeing a minimum wage.

During the 19th and 20th centuries, safer conditions and workers' rights were gradually mandated by law, but this trend has reversed to some extent towards pro-business policies since the 1980s.

In 1935, the National Labor Relations Act recognized and protected "the rights of most workers in the private sector to organize labor unions, to engage in collective bargaining, and to take part in strikes and other forms of concerted activity in support of their demands." However, many states hold to the principle of at-will employment, which says an employee can be fired for any or no reason, without warning and without recourse, unless violation of State or Federal civil rights laws can be proven. In 2011, 11.8% of U.S. workers were members of labor unions with 37% of public sector (government) workers in unions while only 6.9% of private sector workers were union members.

As of 2006, U.S. workers worked longer hours on average than any other industrialized country, having surpassed Japan. Info published in 2007 showed U.S. workers rank high in terms of production.

As of 2008, the United States' maternity leave policy is distinct from other industrialized countries for its relative scarcity of benefits. The length of protected maternity leave ranks 20th out of the 21 high-income countries. Moreover, most foreign wealthy nations provide some form of wage compensation for the leave of absence; the United States is the only one of these 21 countries that does not offer such paid leave.

In 2014, the United States received a grade of "4" on the ITUC's Global Rights Index, which ranks workers' rights in different countries, with "1" being the best and "5" the worst.

In 2014, the United States was considered a "medium risk" country for child labor according to Maplecroft's 2014 Child Labor Index.

In 2015, the United States and Papua New Guinea were reported to be the only countries in the world that did not guarantee paid maternal leave by law.

Reports by the ITUC in 2020 and Oxfam in 2023 stated that the United States ranks among the worst among developed countries for labor protections.

== Health care ==
The Universal Declaration of Human Rights, adopted by the United Nations in 1948, states that "everyone has the right to a standard of living adequate for the health and well-being of oneself and one's family, including food, clothing, housing, and medical care." In addition, the Principles of Medical Ethics of the American Medical Association require medical doctors to respect the human rights of the patient, including that of providing medical treatment when it is needed. Americans' rights in health care are regulated by the US Patients' Bill of Rights.

Unlike most other industrialized nations, the United States does not offer most of its citizens subsidized health care. The United States Medicaid program provides subsidized coverage to some categories of individuals and families with low incomes and resources, including children, pregnant women, and very low-income people with disabilities (higher-earning people with disabilities do not qualify for Medicaid, although they do qualify for Medicare). However, according to Medicaid's own documents, "the Medicaid program does not provide health care services, even for very poor people, unless they are in one of the designated eligibility groups."

Nonetheless, some states offer subsidized health insurance to broader populations. Coverage is subsidized for persons age 65 and over, or who meet other special criteria through Medicare. Every person with a permanent disability, both young and old, is inherently entitled to Medicare health benefits — a fact not all disabled US citizens are aware of. However, just like every other Medicare recipient, a disabled person finds that his or her Medicare benefits only cover up to 80% of what the insurer considers reasonable charges in the U.S. medical system, and that the other 20% plus the difference in the reasonable amount and the actual charge must be paid by other means (typically supplemental, privately held insurance plans, or cash out of the person's own pocket). Therefore, even the Medicare program is not truly national health insurance or universal health care the way most of the rest of the industrialized world understands it.

The Emergency Medical Treatment and Active Labor Act of 1986, an unfunded mandate, mandates that no person may ever be denied emergency services regardless of ability to pay, citizenship, or immigration status. The Emergency Medical Treatment and Labor Act has been criticized by the American College of Emergency Physicians as an unfunded mandate.

46.6 million residents, or 15.9 percent, were without health insurance coverage in 2005. This number includes about 10 million non-citizens, millions more who are eligible for Medicaid but never applied, and 18 million with annual household incomes above $50,000. According to a study led by the Johns Hopkins Children's Center, uninsured children who are hospitalized are 60% more likely to die than children who are covered by health insurance.

== Justice system ==
The Fourth, Fifth, Sixth, and Eighth amendments to the United States Constitution (each part of the Bill of Rights), as well as the Fourteenth amendment, ensure that criminal defendants have significant procedural rights. The incorporation of the Bill of Rights has extended these constitutional protections to the state and local levels of law enforcement. The United States also possesses a system of judicial review over government action.

=== Punishment ===
==== Death penalty ====
Capital punishment repealed or struck down as unconstitutional Capital punishment in statute, but executions formally suspended Capital punishment in statute, but no recent executions Capital punishment in statute, other unique circumstances apply Executions recently carried out

Capital punishment is a legal penalty in the United States, currently used by 23 states, the federal government, and the military. As of 5 March 2020, there have been 1,517 executions in the United States since 1976 (when the death penalty was reinstated after it had been effectively invalidated as a punishment by a 1972 Supreme Court ruling). The United States is one of 55 countries worldwide that uses the death penalty, and was the first to develop lethal injection as a method of execution. Among the 56 countries categorized as 'Very high' on the Human Development Index, it is one of only 12 that retain the death penalty (the others being Singapore, Japan, the United Arab Emirates, Saudi Arabia, Bahrain, Oman, Belarus, Kuwait, Qatar, Malaysia, and Taiwan). Among the world's most economically and politically powerful countries, it is one of the few who utilize capital punishment. In 2011, for instance, it was the only country in the G8 that carried out executions, and was among only three countries in the G20 (along with China and Saudi Arabia) that carried out executions. Of the 56 members states of the Organization for Security and Cooperation in Europe, the United States and Belarus were the only two that carried out executions in 2011.

The vast majority of executions are carried out by state governments, largely as a result of the federal political structure of the United States, in which most crimes are prosecuted by state governments rather than the federal government. Capital punishment is heavily concentrated among several states, with Texas overwhelmingly leading in number of executions at 569 between 1976 and 2020, followed by Virginia with 113 executions, and Oklahoma with 112. The disparity is particularly stark when broken down by county: since 1976, only 2% of counties have been responsible for more than half of all executions. As of 2024, the death penalty has been abolished in the District of Columbia and twenty-three states, mainly in the Northeast and Midwest.

The death penalty has a complex legal history. While modern critics have challenged capital punishment on grounds that it violates the Eighth Amendment's ban on the use of "cruel and unusual punishment", the United States Supreme Court has held that it does not. At the time of the ratification of the Bill of Rights, societal moral standards did not hold the death penalty was "cruel and unusual", so it was used throughout early American history. However, the death penalty was temporarily halted by the Supreme Court on Eighth Amendment grounds from 1972 to 1976. In 1958, the United States Supreme Court ruled in Trop v. Dulles that the Eighth Amendment "must draw its meaning from the evolving standards of decency". This opened the way to the 1972 US Supreme Court case Furman v. Georgia 408 U.S. 238 (1972), which found that the imposition of the death penalty at the states' discretion constituted cruel and unusual punishment in violation of the Eighth Amendment to the United States Constitution, with the Court stating that the death penalty had been applied in a "harsh, freakish, and arbitrary" manner. This ruling was preceded by the Supreme Court of California's ruling in California v. Anderson 64 Cal.2d 633, 414 P.2d 366 (Cal. 1972), which classified capital punishment as cruel and unusual and outlawed the use of capital punishment in California (however, this was reversed the same year through a ballot initiative, Proposition 17). However, the death penalty was ultimately reinstated nationally in 1976 after the US Supreme Court rulings Gregg v. Georgia, 428 U.S. 153 (1976), Jurek v. Texas, 428 U.S. 262 (1976), and Proffitt v. Florida, 428 U.S. 242 (1976). Further refinements have been made to the death penalty since then, with a ruling on March 1, 2005, by the Supreme Court in Roper v. Simmons prohibiting the execution of people who committed their crimes when they were under the age of 18 (between 1990 and 2005, Amnesty International recorded 19 executions in the United States for crimes committed by juveniles). In international law, it has been argued that the United States may be in violation of international human rights treaties in its use of the death penalty. In 1998, the UN special rapporteur recommended to a committee of the UN General Assembly that the United States be found to be in violation of Article 6 of the International Covenant on Civil and Political Rights with regards to the death penalty, and called for an immediate capital punishment moratorium. The recommendation of the special rapporteur, however, is not legally binding under international law and in this case the UN did not act upon the lawyer's recommendation.

Capital punishment within the United States is controversial. Death penalty opponents consider it "inhumane", criticize it for its irreversibility, and assert that it is ineffective as a deterrent against crime, pointing to several studies which show it has little deterring effect on crime (though this point is controversial as studies have conflicted in their conclusions on the effectiveness of the death penalty as a deterrent). Human rights organizations have been particularly critical of it, with Amnesty International, for example, stating that "the death penalty is the ultimate, irreversible denial of human rights." Notably, the European Union, in accordance with its official policy of attempting to achieve global abolition of the death penalty, has been vocal in its criticism of the death penalty in the US and has submitted amicus curiae briefs in a number of important US court cases related to capital punishment. The American Bar Association also sponsors a project aimed at abolishing the death penalty in the United States, criticizing the US's execution of minors and the mentally disabled and arguing that the US fails to adequately protect the rights of the innocent.

Some opponents criticize the over-representation of black people on death row as evidence of the unequal racial application of the death penalty. In McCleskey v. Kemp, for example, it was alleged the capital sentencing process was administered in a racially discriminatory manner in violation of the Equal Protection Clause of the Fourteenth Amendment. This over-representation is not limited to capital offenses—in 1992, at a time when black people accounted for 12% of the US population, about 34% of prison inmates were from this group. Furthermore, in 2003 Amnesty International reported those who kill whites are more likely to be executed than those who kill blacks, citing that of the 845 people executed since 1977 eighty percent were put to death for killing whites and 13 percent were executed for killing blacks, even though blacks and whites are murdered in almost equal numbers.

==== Solitary confinement ====
The United Nations estimates that as of 2013, there were 80,000 prisoners in solitary confinement in the U.S., 12,000 of whom are in California. The use of solitary confinement has drawn criticism and is increasingly viewed as a form of torture because of the psychological harm it causes. The United Nations Special Rapporteur on torture, Juan E. Méndez, has requested that the United States stop holding prisoners in solitary confinement, as "it often causes mental and physical suffering or humiliation, amounting to cruel, inhuman or degrading treatment or punishment, and if the resulting pain or sufferings are severe, solitary confinement even amounts to torture." In a severe example, Herman Wallace and Albert Woodfox, two prisoners at the Angola prison in Louisiana, have each spent more than 40 years in solitary confinement.

==== Sex offender registries ====
The NGO Human Rights Watch has stated that there are human rights issues created by the current sex offender registration laws, and that they believe that the burden of being publicly listed as a sex offender, combined with the restrictions placed on former offenders and their family members, are human rights violations. They have criticized the breadth of the registration requirements, which often treats all offenders the same regardless of the nature of the offense and without accounting the risk of future re-offending, as well as the application of such laws to juvenile offenders, and to crimes such as prostitution and exposing oneself as prank. The ACLU and advocacy group RSOL also believe that measures against sex offenders are inhumane and that current legislation violates the constitutional rights of those with a legal obligation to register. Both organizations have challenged elements of the registration laws in court. By comparison, the European Court of Human Rights has found that indefinite placement on the United Kingdom sex offender registry, which is not available to the general public, is incompatible with an offender's right to privacy if the person has no right to judicial review.

=== Prison system ===
Human rights groups, civil rights organizations, and social critics have criticized the United States for violating fundamental human rights through the use of disproportionately heavy penalties compared to many other countries, overly long prison sentences, over-reliance on police control, excessive control of individual behavior, and societal control of disadvantaged groups. Human Rights Watch, for instance, has argued that "the extraordinary rate of incarceration in the United States wreaks havoc on individuals, families and communities, and saps the strength of the nation as a whole." Political scientist Marie Gottschalk of the University of Pennsylvania writes that a country's expansive carceral state and incarceration rate are major barometers of the level of state violence and control in a society, and that this violence in the United States is being directed at the poor and working classes while there has simultaneously been a mass deregulation and decriminalization of corporate and white collar crime despite "a tsunami of elite-level criminal activities by leading banks, accounting firms and major corporations" throughout the neoliberal era.

The United States has been criticized for its large prison population, which as of 2023 is the largest in the world at 1,767,200. While having the sixth highest per-capita incarceration rate globally, it has the highest incarceration rate among liberal democracies, and disproportionately imprisons racial minorities and those from the lowest socioeconomic backgrounds; according to some scholars including Loïc Wacquant, Elizabeth S. Anderson and Reuben J. Miller, the "explosive growth" of the incarcerated poor can be seen as part of the "punitive regulation" of poverty in the post-Keynesian era in order to mitigate the social fallout from economic deregulation, increasing inequality, and precarious employment, with corporations exploiting "carceral labor" for pennies an hour. It also incarcerates a large number of non-violent and victim-less offenders. Half of all persons incarcerated under State jurisdiction were convicted of non-violent offenses and 20 percent for drug offenses, mostly the possession of cannabis. Marijuana legalization and decriminalization is seen as a step of progress in decreasing the prison population.

The United States also has a high rate of youth imprisonment, with many held in the same prisons as adults. According to The National Council on Crime and Delinquency, since 1990 the incarceration of youth in adult jails has increased 208%. They found that some juveniles had been incarcerated awaiting trial for a long time - up to two years, subjected to the same treatment as adult inmates, and were at greater risk of assault, abuse, or death.

The US also has a large number of foreign nationals in US prisons, with 21% of all federal inmates in 2017 being non-citizens or non-nationals. Additionally, the US Justice Department rarely approves extraditions of foreign prisoners to their home countries, and most are deported after serving their sentences rather than before their trials. This is seen as a contributor to prison overcrowding, especially in California, Arizona, and Texas. This goes hand-in-hand with the US immigration policies, which have also been criticized by human rights groups.

Tolerance of sexual abuse and rape in United States prisons is also an area of concern to human rights watchers. Human Rights Watch, for instance, raised concerns with prisoner rape and medical care for inmates. In a survey of 1,788 male inmates in Midwestern prisons by Prison Journal, about 21% claimed they had been coerced or pressured into sexual activity during their incarceration and 7% claimed that they had been raped in their current facility. The Prison Rape Elimination Act of 2003 unanimously passed in the House and Senate, to wide acclaim from human rights advocates.

=== Police brutality ===
In a 1999 report, Amnesty International said it had "documented patterns of ill-treatment across the U.S., including police beatings, unjustified shootings and the use of dangerous restraint techniques." According to a 1998 Human Rights Watch report, incidents of police use of excessive force had occurred in cities throughout the U.S., and this behavior goes largely unchecked. An article in USA Today reports that in 2006, 96% of cases referred to the U.S. Justice Department for prosecution by investigative agencies were declined. In 2005, 98% were declined. In 2001, The New York Times reported that the U.S. government is unable or unwilling to collect statistics showing the precise number of people killed by the police or the prevalence of the use of excessive force. From 1999 to 2005, at least 148 people have died in the United States and Canada after being shocked with Tasers by police officers, according to a 2005 ACLU report.

On June 2, 2020, George Floyd's official post-mortem report declared the cause of death as asphyxia (lack of oxygen) due to a compression on his neck and back. It also found that the death was a homicide, a statement from the family's legal team said. According to a 2021 article published in The Lancet, more than 30,000 people have died by police violence in the United States from 1980 to 2018. In June 2020, a report from the University of Chicago Law School stated that law enforcement policies in the police departments of 20 largest cities in the United States failed to meet basic standards under international human rights guidelines. According to the report, law enforcement forces are authorized to commit ‘state-sanctioned violence’ without significant reform.

The use of strip searches and cavity searches by law enforcement agencies and in the prison system has raised human rights concerns.

The practice of taking an arrested person on a perp walk, often handcuffed, through a public place at some point after the arrest, creating an opportunity for the media to take photographs and video of the event has raised civil and human rights concerns.

=== Racial discrimination ===
Human rights organizations, civil rights groups, academics, journalists, and other critics have argued that the US justice system exhibits racial biases that harm minority groups, particularly African Americans. There are significant racial disparities within the prison population of the United States, with black individuals making up 38.2% of the federal prison population in 2020, despite the fact that African Americans only comprise 13.4% of the nation's entire population. Studies have also found that black people, as well as other minority groups, are shot and killed by the police at higher rates than white people, tend to receive harsher punishments than white people, are more likely to be charged for drug crimes despite consuming drugs at similar rates as white people, are at higher lifetime risk of being killed by police than white people, are more likely to be stopped by police while driving, and are more likely to be arrested during a police stop. As the Sentencing Project said in their report to the United Nations:

African Americans are more likely than white Americans to be arrested; once arrested, they are more likely to be convicted; and once convicted, they are more likely to experience lengthy prison sentences.

The cause of this is disputed. There is a widespread belief among the American public that racial discrimination by the police is a persistent problem, and many academics and journalists assert that systemic racism, as well as a number of factors like concentrated poverty and higher rates of substandard housing (which has also led to greater rates of lead poisoning among African Americans) that they argue arise out of past racial segregation or other forms of historical oppression, contribute to the racial disparities.

=== Procedural concerns ===
The National Association of Criminal Defense Lawyers and Human Rights Watch have argued that there exists a "trial penalty"—a penalty for electing to go to trial that arises from the discrepancy between the punishment a defendant would receive by waiving the right to trial and accepting a plea bargain compared to the punishment they might receive at trial—which they argue abridges the right to trial guaranteed by the Sixth Amendment to the United States Constitution.

There has also been criticism over qualified immunity, a judicial precedent that grants government officials—including police officers— certain immunity from civil suits. Critics have argued that qualified immunity makes it unnecessarily difficult to sue public officials for misconduct, including civil rights violations; this has been implicated in particular for enabling police brutality. Despite safeguards in place around recruitment, some police departments have hired officers who had histories of poor performance or misconduct in other departments, an issue known as hiring "gypsy cops".

== Human rights and foreign policy ==
The U.S. Department of State publishes a yearly report "Supporting Human Rights and Democracy: The U.S. Record" in compliance with a 2002 law that requires the department to report on actions taken by the U.S. Government to encourage respect for human rights. It also publishes yearly "Country Reports on Human Rights Practices."

According to the Canadian historian Michael Ignatieff, both during and after the Cold War, the US emphasized human rights more than other nations emphasized it as a part of its foreign policy, awarded foreign aid to facilitate progress on human rights, and annually assessed the human rights records of other national governments.

The US has also faced criticism over its human rights foreign policy. For example, numerous academics and journalists, among them J. Patrice McSherry and Vincent Bevins, have documented significant US support for right-wing dictatorships, state terrorism, and mass killings during the Cold War. The country has not ratified as many international human rights treaties as other liberal democracies have, it has also not ratified the 1969 Vienna Convention on the Law of Treaties.

=== Treaties ratified ===
See also International Covenant on Civil and Political Rights - United States

The U.S. has signed and ratified the following human rights treaties:

- International Covenant on Civil and Political Rights (ICCPR) (ratified with 5 reservations, 5 understandings, and 4 declarations.)
- Optional protocol on the involvement of children in armed conflict
- International Convention on the Elimination of All Forms of Racial Discrimination
- Convention against Torture and Other Cruel, Inhuman or Degrading Treatment or Punishment
- Protocol relating to the Status of Refugees
- Optional Protocol to the Convention on the Rights of the Child on the Sale of Children, Child Prostitution and Child Pornography

Non-binding documents voted for:

- Universal Declaration of Human Rights

=== International Bill of Rights ===
See also International Covenant on Civil and Political Rights - United States

The International Covenant on Civil and Political Rights (ICCPR) and the International Covenant on Economic, Social and Cultural Rights (ICESCR) are the legal treaties that enshrine the rights outlined in the Universal Declaration of Human Rights. Together, and along with the first and second optional protocols of the ICCPR they constitute the International bill of rights The US has not ratified the ICESCR or either of the optional protocols of the ICCPR.

The US's ratification of the ICCPR was done with five reservations – or limits – on the treaty, 5 understandings and 4 declarations. Among these is the rejection of sections of the treaty that prohibit capital punishment. Included in the Senate's ratification was the declaration that "the provisions of Article 1 through 27 of the Covenant are not self-executing", and in a Senate Executive Report stated that the declaration was meant to "clarify that the Covenant will not create a private cause of action in U.S. Courts." This way of ratifying the treaty was criticized as incompatible with the Supremacy Clause by Louis Henkin.

=== International Criminal Court ===
The United States has not ratified the Rome Statute of the International Criminal Court (ICC), which was drafted for prosecuting individuals above the authority of national courts in the event of accusations of genocide, crimes against humanity, war crimes, and crime of aggression. Nations that have accepted the Rome Statute can defer to the jurisdiction of the ICC or must surrender their jurisdiction when ordered.

The U.S. rejected the Rome Statute after its attempts to include the nation of origin as a party in international proceedings failed, and after certain requests were not met, including recognition of gender issues, "rigorous" qualifications for judges, viable definitions of crimes, protection of national security information that might be sought by the court, and jurisdiction of the UN Security Council to halt court proceedings in special cases. Since the passage of the statute, the U.S. has actively encouraged nations around the world to sign "bilateral immunity agreements" prohibiting the surrender of U.S. personnel before the ICC and actively attempted to undermine the Rome Statute of the International Criminal Court. The U.S. Congress also passed a law, American Service-Members' Protection Act (ASPA), authorizing the use of military force to free any U.S. personnel that are brought before the court rather than its own court system. Human Rights Watch criticized the United States for removing itself from the Statute.

Objections to the Rome Statute have revolved around issues of jurisdiction and process. A U.S. ambassador for War Crimes Issues to the UN Security Council said that, because the Rome Statute requires only one nation to submit to the ICC, and that this nation can be the country in which an alleged crime was committed rather than defendant's country of origin, military personnel and foreign peaceworkers in more than 100 countries could be tried in international court without the consent of the US. The ambassador stated that "most atrocities are committed internally and most internal conflicts are between warring parties of the same nationality, the worst offenders of international humanitarian law can choose never to join the treaty and be fully insulated from its reach absent a Security Council referral."

=== Other treaties not signed or signed but not ratified ===
The U.S. has not ratified the following international human rights treaties:

- First Optional Protocol to the International Covenant on Civil and Political Rights (ICCPR)
- Second Optional Protocol to the International Covenant on Civil and Political Rights, aiming at the abolition of the death penalty
- Optional Protocol to CEDAW
- Optional Protocol to the Convention against Torture
- Convention relating to the Status of Refugees (1951)
- Convention Relating to the Status of Stateless Persons (1954)
- Convention on the Reduction of Statelessness (1961)
- International Convention on the Protection of the Rights of All Migrant Workers and Members of their Families

The US has signed but not ratified the following treaties:

- Convention on the Elimination of All Forms of Discrimination against Women (CEDAW)
- Convention on the Rights of the Child (CRC)
- International Covenant on Economic, Social and Cultural Rights
- Convention on the Rights of Persons with Disabilities

Non-binding documents voted against:

- Declaration on the Rights of Indigenous Peoples in September 2007.

=== Inter-American human rights system ===
The US is a signatory to the 1948 American Declaration of the Rights and Duties of Man and has signed but not ratified the 1969 American Convention on Human Rights. It is a member of Inter-American Convention on the Granting of Political Rights to Women (1948). It does not accept the adjudicatory jurisdiction of the Costa Rica-based Inter-American Court of Human Rights.

The US has not ratified any of the other regional human rights treaties of the Organization of American States, which include:

- Protocol to the American Convention on Human Rights to Abolish the Death Penalty (1990)
- Additional Protocol to the American Convention on Human Rights in the Area of Economic, Social and Cultural Rights
- Inter-American Convention to Prevent and Punish Torture (1985)
- Inter-American Convention on the Prevention, Punishment and Eradication of Violence Against Women (1994)
- Inter-American Convention on Forced Disappearance of Persons (1994)
- Inter-American Convention on the Elimination of All Forms of Discrimination against Persons with Disabilities

=== Coverage of violations in the media ===
Studies have found that The New York Times coverage of worldwide human rights violations predominately focuses on human rights violations in nations where there is clear U.S. involvement, while having relatively little coverage of the human rights violations in other nations. Amnesty International's Secretary General Irene Khan explains, "If we focus on the U.S. it's because we believe that the U.S. is a country whose enormous influence and power has to be used constructively ... When countries like the U.S. are seen to undermine or ignore human rights, it sends a very powerful message to others."

=== Inhumane treatment and torture of foreign prisoners ===
The US Senate Report on CIA Detention Interrogation Program that details the use of torture during CIA detention and interrogation

International and U.S. law prohibits torture and other acts of cruel, inhuman, or degrading treatment or punishment of any person in custody in all circumstances, especially in a state of armed conflict. However, the United States Government has categorized a large number of people as unlawful combatants, a classification which denies the privileges of prisoner of war (POW) designation of the Geneva Conventions.

Certain practices of the United States military and Central Intelligence Agency have been widely condemned domestically and internationally as torture. A fierce debate regarding non-standard interrogation techniques exists within the U.S. civilian and military intelligence community, with no general consensus as to what practices under what conditions are acceptable.

Abuse of prisoners is considered a crime in the United States Uniform Code of Military Justice. According to a January 2006 Human Rights First report, there were 45 suspected or confirmed homicides while in U.S. custody in Iraq and Afghanistan; "Certainly 8, as many as 12, people were tortured to death."

==== Abu Ghraib prison abuse ====
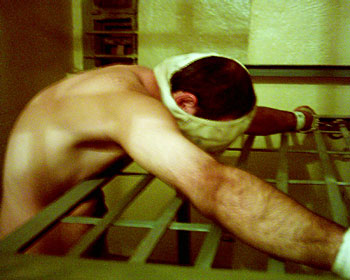
Detainee handcuffed in the nude to a bed with a pair of panties covering his face

In 2004, photos showing humiliation and abuse of prisoners were leaked from Abu Ghraib prison, causing a political and media scandal in the US. Forced humiliation of the detainees included, but was not limited to: forced nudity; rape; human piling of nude detainees; masturbation; eating food out of toilets; crawling on hands and knees while American soldiers sat on their backs, sometimes requiring them to bark like dogs; and hooking up electrical wires to fingers, toes, and penises. Bertrand Ramcharan, the acting UN High Commissioner for Human Rights, stated that while the removal of Saddam Hussein represented "a major contribution to human rights in Iraq" and that the United States had condemned the conduct at Abu Ghraib and pledged to bring violators to justice, "willful killing, torture and inhuman treatment" represented a grave breach of international law and "might be designated as war crimes by a competent tribunal".

In addition to the acts of humiliation, there were more violent claims, such as American soldiers sodomizing detainees (including an event involving an underage boy), an incident in which a phosphoric light was broken and the chemicals poured on a detainee, repeated beatings, and threats of death. Six military personnel were charged with prisoner abuse in the Abu Ghraib torture and prisoner abuse scandal. The harshest sentence was handed out to Charles Graner, who received a 10-year sentence to be served in a military prison and a demotion to private; the other offenders received lesser sentences.

In their report The Road to Abu Ghraib, Human Rights Watch states:

The [Bush] administration effectively sought to re-write the Geneva Conventions of 1949 to eviscerate many of their most important protections. These include the rights of all detainees in an armed conflict to be free from humiliating and degrading treatment, as well as from torture and other forms of coercive interrogation.

==== Enhanced interrogation and waterboarding ====
On February 6, 2008, the CIA director General Michael Hayden stated that the CIA had used waterboarding on three prisoners during 2002 and 2003, namely Khalid Shaikh Mohammed, Abu Zubayda and Abd al-Rahim al-Nashiri.

The June 21, 2004, issue of Newsweek stated that the Bybee memo, a 2002 legal memorandum drafted by former OLC lawyer John Yoo that described what sort of interrogation tactics against suspected terrorists or terrorist affiliates the Bush administration would consider legal, was "... prompted by CIA questions about what to do with a top Qaeda captive, Abu Zubaydah, who had turned uncooperative ... and was drafted after White House meetings convened by George W. Bush's chief counsel, Alberto Gonzales, along with Defense Department general counsel William Haynes and David Addington, Vice President Dick Cheney's counsel, who discussed specific interrogation techniques," citing "a source familiar with the discussions." Amongst the methods they found acceptable was waterboarding.

In November 2005, ABC News reported that former CIA agents claimed that the CIA engaged in a modern form of waterboarding, along with five other "enhanced interrogation techniques", against suspected members of al Qaeda.

UN High Commissioner for Human Rights, Louise Arbour, stated on the subject of waterboarding "I would have no problems with describing this practice as falling under the prohibition of torture," and that violators of the UN Convention Against Torture should be prosecuted under the principle of universal jurisdiction.

Bent Sørensen, Senior Medical Consultant to the International Rehabilitation Council for Torture Victims and former member of the United Nations Committee Against Torture has said that waterboarding "... can without any reservation be labeled as torture."

Both Human Rights Watch and Amnesty International have condemned waterboarding as a form of torture, the latter group demanding that former president George W. Bush be prosecuted.

Lt. Gen. Michael D. Maples, the director of the Defense Intelligence Agency, concurred by stating, in a hearing before the Senate Armed Services Committee, that he believes waterboarding violates Common Article 3 of the Geneva Conventions.

The Tokyo War Crimes Tribunal and United Nations War Crimes Commission both defined waterboarding as ill-treatment and torture in the aftermath of World War II.

The CIA director testified that waterboarding has not been used since 2003.

In April 2009, the Obama administration released four memos in which government lawyers from the Bush administration approved tough interrogation methods used against 28 terror suspects. The rough tactics range from waterboarding (simulated drowning) to keeping suspects naked and denying them solid food.

These memos were accompanied by the Justice Department's release of four Bush-era legal opinions covering (in graphic and extensive detail) the interrogation of 14 high-value terror detainees using harsh techniques beyond waterboarding. These additional techniques include keeping detainees in a painful standing position for long periods (Used often, once for 180 hours), using a plastic neck collar to slam detainees into walls, keeping the detainee's cell cold for long periods, beating and kicking the detainee, insects placed in a confinement box (the suspect had a fear of insects), sleep-deprivation, prolonged shackling, and threats to a detainee's family. One of the memos also authorized a method for combining multiple techniques.

Details from the memos also included the number of times that techniques such as waterboarding were used. A footnote said that one detainee was waterboarded 83 times in one month, while another was waterboarded 183 times in a month. This may have gone beyond even what was allowed by the CIA's own directives, which limit waterboarding to 12 times a day. The Fox News website carried reports from an unnamed U.S. official who claimed that these were the number of pourings, not the number of sessions.

Physicians for Human Rights has accused the Bush administration of conducting illegal human experiments and unethical medical research during interrogations of suspected terrorists. The group has suggested this activity was a violation of the standards set by the Nuremberg Trials.

==== Guantánamo Bay ====
The United States maintains a detention center at its military base at Guantánamo Bay, Cuba where enemy combatants of the war on terror are held. The detention center has been the source of various controversies regarding the legality of the center and the treatment of detainees. Amnesty International has called the situation "a human rights scandal" in a series of reports. 775 detainees have been brought to Guantánamo. Of these, many have been released without charge. As of January 6, 2025, 15 detainees remain at Guantanamo Bay. The United States assumed territorial control over Guantánamo Bay under the 1903 Cuban–American Treaty of Relations, which granted the United States a perpetual lease of the area. United States, by virtue of its complete jurisdiction and control, maintains "de facto" sovereignty over this territory, while Cuba retained ultimate sovereignty over the territory. The current government of Cuba regards the U.S. presence in Guantánamo as illegal and insists the Cuban-American Treaty was obtained by threat of force in violation of international law.

A delegation of UN Special Rapporteurs to Guantanamo Bay claimed that interrogation techniques used in the detention center amount to degrading treatment in violation of the ICCPR and the Convention Against Torture.

In 2005, Amnesty International expressed alarm at the erosion in civil liberties since the 9/11 attacks. According to Amnesty International:

The Guantánamo Bay detention camp has become a symbol of the United States administration's refusal to put human rights and the rule of law at the heart of its response to the atrocities of September 11, 2001.

Amnesty International also condemned the Guantánamo facility as "... the gulag of our times," which raised heated conversation in the United States. The purported legal status of "unlawful combatants" in those nations currently holding detainees under that name has been the subject of criticism by other nations and international human rights institutions including Human Rights Watch and the International Committee of the Red Cross. The ICRC, in response to the U.S.-led military campaign in Afghanistan, published a paper on the subject. In a 2005 report, Human Rights Watch cites two sergeants and a captain accusing U.S. troops of torturing prisoners in Iraq and Afghanistan.

However, former Republican governor Mike Huckabee, for example, has stated that the conditions in Guantánamo are better than most U.S. prisons.

The U.S. government argues that even if detainees were entitled to POW status, they would not have the right to lawyers, access to the courts to challenge their detention, or the opportunity to be released prior to the end of hostilities—and that nothing in the Third Geneva Convention provides POWs such rights, and POWs in past wars—such as Japanese prisoners of war in World War II—have generally not been given these rights. The U.S. Supreme Court ruled in Hamdan v. Rumsfeld on June 29, 2006, that they were entitled to the minimal protections listed under Common Article 3 of the Geneva Conventions. Following this, on July 7, 2006, the Department of Defense issued an internal memo stating that prisoners would in the future be entitled to protection under Common Article 3.

==== Extraordinary rendition ====
The U.S. and suspected CIA "black sites" Extraordinary renditions allegedly have been carried out from these countries Detainees have allegedly been transported through these countries Detainees have allegedly arrived in these countries Sources: Amnesty International Human Rights Watch

In a process known as extraordinary rendition, foreign nationals have been captured and abducted outside of the United States and transferred to secret US-administered detention facilities, sometimes being held incommunicado for months or years. According to The New Yorker, "The most common destinations for rendered suspects are Egypt, Morocco, Syria, and Jordan, all of which have been cited for human-rights violations by the State Department, and are known to torture suspects."

===== Notable cases =====
In November 2001, Yaser Esam Hamdi, a U.S. citizen, was captured by Afghan Northern Alliance forces in Konduz, Afghanistan, amongst hundreds of surrendering Taliban fighters and was transferred into U.S. custody. The U.S. government alleged that Hamdi was there fighting for the Taliban, while Hamdi, through his father, has claimed that he was merely there as a relief worker and was mistakenly captured. Hamdi was transferred into CIA custody and transferred to the Guantanamo Bay Naval Base, but when it was discovered that he was a U.S. citizen, he was transferred to a naval brig in Norfolk, Virginia and then to a brig in Charleston, South Carolina. The Bush Administration identified him as an unlawful combatant and denied him access to an attorney or the court system, despite his Fifth Amendment right to due process. In 2002 Hamdi's father filed a habeas corpus petition, the Judge ruled in Hamdi's favor and required he be allowed a public defender; however, on appeal the decision was reversed. In 2004, in the case of Hamdi v. Rumsfeld the U.S. Supreme court reversed the dismissal of a habeas corpus petition and ruled detainees who are U.S. citizens must have the ability to challenge their detention before an impartial judge.

In December 2004, Khalid El-Masri, a German citizen, was apprehended by Macedonian authorities when traveling to Skopje because his name was similar to Khalid al-Masri, an alleged mentor to the al-Qaeda Hamburg cell. After being held in a motel in Macedonia for over three weeks he was transferred to the CIA and extradited to Afghanistan. While held in Afghanistan, El-Masri claims he was sodomized, beaten, and repeatedly interrogated about alleged terrorist ties. After being in custody for five months, Condoleezza Rice learned of his detention and ordered his release. El-Masri was released at night on a desolate road in Albania, without apology or funds to return home. He was intercepted by Albanian guards, who believed he was a terrorist due to his haggard and unkept appearance. He was subsequently reunited with his wife who had returned to her family in Lebanon with their children because she thought her husband had abandoned them. Using isotope analysis, scientists at the Bavarian archive for geology in Munich analyzed his hair and verified that he was malnourished during his disappearance.

In 2007, U.S. President Bush signed an Executive order banning the use of torture in the CIA's interrogation program.

According to the Human Rights Watch report (September 2012) the United States government during the U.S. President Bush republican administration "waterboarding" tortured opponents of Muammar Gaddafi during interrogations, then transferred them to mistreatment in Libya. President Barack Obama has denied water torture.

=== Sanctions ===
China contends that unilateral sanctions imposed by the United States are human rights violations. China cites the example of U.S. sanctions imposed against Iran during the COVID-19 pandemic, contending that these sanctions contributed to approximately 13,000 deaths from inadequate medical care.

== Unethical human experimentation ==
Well-known cases include:

- Albert Kligman's dermatology experiments
- Henrietta Lacks
- Medical Experimentation on Black Americans
- Milgram experiment
- Monster Study
- Plutonium injections
- Project MKULTRA
- Project MKOFTEN
- Stanford prison experiment
- Tuskegee syphilis experiment

== Further assessments ==
The Polity data series generated by the Political Instability Task Force, a U.S. government-funded project, rating regime and authority characteristics, covering the years 1800–2018, has given the US 10 points out of 10 for the years 1871–1966 and 1974–2015. The US score declined to 8 in 2016, 2017, and 2018.

According to the Economist Magazine's Democracy Index (2016), the US ranks 21 out of 167 nations. In 2016 and 2017, the United States was classified as a "Flawed Democracy" by Democracy Index and received a score of 8.24 out of 10.00 with respect to civil liberties. This was the first time the United States had been downgraded from a "Full Democracy" to a "Flawed Democracy" since the Democracy Index began publishing in 2006.

According to the annual Worldwide Press Freedom Index published by Reporters Without Borders, due to journalist harassment and public distrust in mainstream media, the U.S. ranked 44 out of 197 countries for press freedom.

According to the annual Corruption Perceptions Index, which was published by Transparency International, the United States ranked 25th out of 180 countries with of 67/100 for political transparency.

According to the annual Privacy International index of 2007, the United States was ranked an "endemic surveillance society", scoring only 1.5 out of 5 privacy points.

According to the annual Democracy Matrix, which is published by the University of Würzburg, the US was a "working democracy" in 2019, which is the highest category in that index, although it is the third-lowest ranking country in that category (36th overall).

According to the Gallup International Millennium Survey, the United States ranked 23rd in citizens' perception of human rights observance when its citizens were asked, "In general, do you think that human rights are being fully respected, partially respected or are they not being respected at all in your country?"

== Other issues ==
In the aftermath of Hurricane Katrina, criticism was made by some groups regarding recovery and reconstruction issues. The American Civil Liberties Union and the National Prison Project documented mistreatment of the prison population during the flooding, while United Nations Special Rapporteur Doudou Diène delivered a 2008 report on such issues. The United States was elected in 2009 to sit on the United Nations Human Rights Council (UNHRC), which the U.S. State Department had previously asserted had lost its credibility by its prior stances and lack of safeguards against severe human rights violators taking a seat. In 2006 and 2007, the UNHCR and Martin Scheinin were critical of the United States regard permitting executions by lethal injection, housing children in adult jails, subjecting prisoners to prolonged isolation in supermax prisons, using enhanced interrogation techniques and domestic poverty gaps.

On 9 November 2020, during a session at the UN's main human rights body, the United States came under scrutiny for the detention of migrant children and the killings of unarmed Black people during Donald Trump’s tenure. Critics, including officials from Iran, Syria, Venezuela, Russia and China, raised concerns on the United States human rights records that followed up on an August report about past rights records of the US. The Kino Border Initiative tracked 78 complaints from migrants between 2010 and 2022, of which it says 95 percent did not lead to any investigation or proper disciplinary action.

The most important recommendations from UN member states to the United States concerned the following issues:

- Racial discrimination
- Police violence
- Death penalty
- Immigrant rights
- Indigenous rights
- Environmental justice

=== Citizenship and Immigration ===
Unlike in criminal court, defendants in immigration court, a civil court, do not have the right to counsel.

=== Universal Periodic Review ===
The United States is periodically reviewed under the United Nations Human Rights Council's Universal Periodic Review (UPR) mechanism. During successive review cycles, UN member states have issued recommendations addressing a wide range of human rights issues, including racial discrimination, police use of force, capital punishment, immigration detention, Indigenous peoples' rights, gender equality, and voting rights. While the United States has accepted a number of recommendations and noted others, UN monitoring bodies have continued to identify recurring concerns in several policy areas, making the UPR process an important source for evaluating the country's implementation of its international human rights obligations.

=== Lack of a national human rights institution ===
The United States does not maintain an independent National Human Rights Institution (NHRI) accredited under the United Nations Paris Principles. Instead, responsibility for the promotion and protection of human rights is distributed among federal agencies, courts, state governments, and independent commissions. Legal scholars have argued that the absence of a nationally accredited NHRI may limit institutional coordination, monitoring, and engagement with international human rights mechanisms…

== See also ==
Criticism of the US human rights record

- Human Rights Record of the United States, a report published by the People's Republic of China
- United States and State terrorism
- United States and state-sponsored terrorism

US human rights abuses

- Unethical human experimentation in the United States
- Human rights violations by the CIA

Organizations involved in US human rights

- Pennsylvania Abolition Society
- National Organization for Women
- Human Rights Campaign
- US Human Rights Network

People involved in US human rights

- Susan B. Anthony
- Anthony Benezet
- Mary Bonauto
- Louis Henkin
- Martin Luther King Jr.
- Gay McDougall
- Gloria Steinem
- Ida B. Wells

Notable comments on US human rights

- Four Freedoms, a 1941 speech delivered by U.S. President Franklin D. Roosevelt
- Second Bill of Rights, a list of rights proposed by Roosevelt during his State of the Union Address on January 11, 1944.
