= International human rights instruments =

Treaties for the protection of human rights

International human rights instruments are the treaties and other international texts that serve as legal sources for international human rights law and the protection of human rights in general. There are many varying types, but most can be classified into two broad categories: declarations, adopted by bodies such as the United Nations General Assembly, which are by nature declaratory, so not legally-binding although they may be politically authoritative and very well-respected soft law, and often express guiding principles; and conventions that are multi-party treaties that are designed to become legally binding, usually include prescriptive and very specific language, and usually are concluded by a long procedure that frequently requires ratification by each states' legislature. Less well known are certain "recommendations" which, while similar to conventions in that they are multilaterally agreed, cannot be ratified and instead serve to establish common standards. There may also be administrative guidelines that are agreed multilaterally by states, as well as the statutes of tribunals or other institutions. A specific prescription or principle from any of these various international instruments can, over time, attain the status of customary international law whether it is specifically accepted by a state or not, just because it is well-recognized and followed over a sufficiently long time.

International human rights instruments can be divided further into global instruments, to which any state in the world can be a party, and regional instruments, which are restricted to states in a particular region of the world.

Most conventions and recommendations (but few declarations) establish mechanisms for monitoring and establish bodies to oversee their implementation. In some cases these bodies that may have relatively little political authority or legal means, and may be ignored by member states; in other cases these mechanisms have bodies with great political authority and their decisions are almost always implemented. A good example of the latter is the European Court of Human Rights.

Monitoring mechanisms also vary as to the degree of individual access to expose cases of abuse and plea for remedies. Under some conventions or recommendations – e.g. the European Convention on Human Rights – individuals or states are permitted, subject to certain conditions, to take individual cases to a full-fledged tribunal at international level. Sometimes, this can be done in national courts because of universal jurisdiction.

The Universal Declaration of Human Rights, the International Covenant on Civil and Political Rights, and the International Covenant on Economic, Social and Cultural Rights together with other international human rights instruments are sometimes referred to as the "International Bill of Human Rights". International human rights instruments are identified by the OHCHR and most are referenced on the OHCHR website.

== Declarations ==
=== Global ===
- Declaration of the Rights of the Child 1923
- Universal Declaration of Human Rights (UN, 1948)
- Declaration on the Rights of Disabled Persons (UN, 1975)
- Declaration on the Right to Development (UN study published in 1979; UN declaration proclaimed in 1986)
- Vienna Declaration and Programme of Action (World Conference on Human Rights, 1993)
- Beijing Declaration and Platform for Action (The Fourth World Conference on Women, 1995)
- Declaration of Human Duties and Responsibilities (UNESCO, 1998)
- Universal Declaration on Cultural Diversity (UNESCO, 2001)
- Declaration on the Rights of Indigenous Peoples (UN, 2007)
- UN declaration on sexual orientation and gender identity (UN, 2008)

=== Regional: Americas ===
- American Declaration of the Rights and Duties of Man (OAS, 1948)
- American Declaration on the Rights of Indigenous Peoples (OAS, 2016)

=== Regional: Asia ===
- Declaration of the Basic Duties of ASEAN Peoples and Governments (Regional Council on Human Rights in Asia, 1983)
- ASEAN Human Rights Declaration (ASEAN, 2009)

=== Regional: Middle East ===
- Cairo Declaration of Human Rights in Islam (OIC,1990)

== Conventions ==
=== Global ===
According to OHCHR, there are 9 core international human rights instruments and several optional protocols.

- Convention on the Elimination of All Forms of Racial Discrimination (ICERD, 21 December 1965)
- International Covenant on Civil and Political Rights (ICCPR, 16 December 1966)
- International Covenant on Economic, Social, and Cultural Rights (ICESCR, 16 December 1966)
- Convention on the Elimination of All Forms of Discrimination Against Women (CEDAW, 18 December 1979)
- Convention against Torture and Other Cruel, Inhuman or Degrading Treatment or Punishment (CAT, 10 December 1984)
- Convention on the Rights of the Child (CRC, 20 November 1989)
- International Convention on the Protection of the Rights of All Migrant Workers and Members of Their Families (ICMW, 18 December 1990)
- International Convention for the Protection of All Persons from Enforced Disappearance (CPED, 20 December 2006)
- Convention on the Rights of Persons with Disabilities (CRPD, 13 December 2006)

Several more human rights instruments exist. A few examples:

- The International Convention on the Suppression and Punishment of the Crime of Apartheid (ICSPCA)
- International Convention on the Protection of the Rights of All Migrant Workers and Members of Their Families
- Convention Relating to the Status of Refugees and Protocol Relating to the Status of Refugees
- Convention on the Reduction of Statelessness
- Convention on the Prevention and Punishment of the Crime of Genocide
- Indigenous and Tribal Peoples Convention, 1989 (ILO 169)
- Inaugural HURIDOCS Assembly (HURIDOCS, 24 July 1982)
- SOS-Torture Convention (OMCT, 14 April 1983)

=== Regional: Africa ===
- African Charter on Human and Peoples' Rights (June, 1981)
- African Charter on the Rights and Welfare of the Child (1990)
- Maputo Protocol (11 July 2003)
- African Youth Charter (June 30, 2006)
- African Disability Protocol (June 30, 2019)
- SADC Gender Protocol (revised version enters into force 2018)

=== Regional: America ===
- American Convention on Human Rights
- Inter-American Convention to Prevent and Punish Torture
- Inter-American Convention on Forced Disappearance of Persons
- Inter-American Convention on the Prevention, Punishment, and Eradication of Violence against Women
- Inter-American Convention on the Elimination of All Forms of Discrimination against Persons with Disabilities

=== Regional: Europe ===
- Charter of Fundamental Rights of the European Union
- Convention on Action against Trafficking in Human Beings
- European Convention on Nationality
- European Charter for Regional or Minority Languages (ECRML)
- European Convention on Human Rights (ECHR)
- European Convention for the Prevention of Torture and Inhuman or Degrading Treatment or Punishment (CPT)
- European Social Charter (ESC), and Revised Social Charter
- Framework Convention for the Protection of National Minorities (FCNM)

=== Regional: Middle East ===
- Arab Charter on Human Rights (ACHR) (22 May 2004)

== See also ==
- Universal jurisdiction
- Rule of Law in Armed Conflicts Project (RULAC)
- International Criminal Court (established in 2002)
- International human rights law
- Human rights inflation
- Human rights treaty bodies
- List of human rights organizations
- List of indigenous rights organizations
- List of international animal welfare conventions
- Rule of law
- Rule According to Higher Law
