= Declaration of Human Duties and Responsibilities =

1998 UNESCO declaration

The Declaration of Human Duties and Responsibilities (DHDR) was written for reinforcing the implementation of human rights under the auspices of the UNESCO and the interest of the Office of the United Nations High Commissioner for Human Rights and was proclaimed in 1998 "to commemorate the 50th anniversary of the Universal Declaration of Human Rights (UDHR)" in the city of Valencia. Therefore, it is also known as the Valencia Declaration.

Looking toward the coming 21st century, the authors sought to address the unfinished realization of universal human rights. Expanding on the UDHR, the DHDR formulates related duties and responsibilities related to relationships between people and states.

The point of departure of the DHDR Preamble is the shared concern regarding the lack of political will for enforcing globally human rights fifty years after the adoption of the UDHR and following human rights instruments. The preamble cites existing declarations on the subject, affirms the rights of all beings, recognizes the challenges the new technologies have brought about, and recognizes specific groups in need of special mention, including women and Indigenous people.

Its 12 chapters and 41 articles can be compared with the human rights such as formulated in the UDHR and recent initiatives that reflect a similar preoccupation for the formulation of duties and responsibilities, such as the United Nations Millennium Declaration, the Statute of Rome, the Global Compact, The Earth Charter, the Kyoto Protocol, and UNESCO declarations and conventions.

== History ==
The declaration was drafted by a diverse group of experts integrated by Nobel laureates - Joseph Rotblat, Wole Soyinka and Dario Fo. It included scientists, politicians, and philosophers, including, Federico Mayor Zaragoza, Richard Falk, Ruud Lubbers, Lord Frank Judd, Sergey Kapitsa, Jakob von Uexküll, Fernando Savater. Its chairman was South African judge, Richard Goldstone. This process was inspired by the need –in words of Justice Goldstone- of the transition from a “formal equality” to a "substantial equality" with a shared concern of the situation of millions of ignored and marginalised people in our globalised world: “the recognition of human rights is insufficient, … if such so rights are to be realized it is necessary that they are enforceable... There must be a duty on all relevant authorities and individuals to enforce those rights.” With a convergent perspective, Norberto Bobbio has entirely supported the initiative and the text of the DHDR, in particular taking into account the main concern for humanity of reinforcing the international systems. In that context, he has established an interesting comparison between the transition from “moral rights” to “legal rights” and the need to transform “moral duties” into “legal duties” (See: Norberto Bobbio, Declaration of Human Duties and Responsibilities, page 98).

This Declaration proposes comprehensively the implicit system of duties and responsibilities contained in our human rights systems, in particular, that enshrined in the Universal Declaration of Human Rights (UDHR) and in subsequent international human rights instruments and establishes consequently their bearers.

== DHDR Chapter I: The General Provisions ==
In DHDR Article 1 “duty” and “responsibility” are defined for the purpose of the declaration: "duty" means an ethical or moral obligation; and "responsibility", an obligation that is legally binding under existing international law. The DHDR explains in details the complexity of the exercise of responsibilities. The bearers are the members of the global community that have collective, as well as individual duties and responsibilities, to promote universal observance of human rights and fundamental freedoms. “Global community" means both States and non-States actors: international, regional and sub-regional intergovernmental organisations, non-governmental organisations, public and private sector (trans)national corporations, other entities of civil society, peoples, communities, and individuals taken collectively.

The DHDR reflects the gamut of both states and non-states actors that have to be mutually supportive bearers of duties and responsibilities. On the contrary, the UN Millennium Declaration (MD), a recent international document addressed to the governments, is focused primarily on the States responsibilities that are shared and collective: “We /heads of State and Government / recognize that, in addition to our separate responsibilities to our individual societies, we have a collective responsibility to uphold the principles of human dignity, equality, and equity at the global level. As leaders we have a duty therefore to all the world’s people…”

DHDR Article 2 is dedicated to postulate exhaustively the bearers of duties and responsibilities: “Members of the global community have collective, as well as individual duties and responsibilities, to promote universal respect for and observance of human rights and fundamental freedoms.…” This declaration considers the existence of collective responsibilities inside the limits traced by the universally recognized rights, with the implicit consequences of accountability that would be fairly distributed. The DHDR addresses simultaneously the responsibilities of individuals and groups. It states: “As the holders of human rights and fundamental freedoms, all individuals, peoples, and communities in the exercise of their rights and freedoms, have the duty and responsibility to respect those of others, and a duty to strive for the promotion and observance thereof”. This statement continues appropriately the way initiated by the UDHR in Article 29 and reiterates the interaction of duties, responsibilities, and rights of the International Covenants on Human Rights of 1966.

== DHDR Chapter 2: The right to life and human security ==
Most of the titles of the DHDR chapters enunciate a right or fundamental freedom that will be the thematic focus of the related duties and responsibilities. Chapter 2 begins the list of duties and responsibilities with the right to life and human security, rights to be secure for the present and also future generations in the awareness that for the first time in human history the humankind survival is in peril due to human action. Following the UDHR Article 3 “Everyone has the right to life, liberty, and security of person”; this chapter draws our attention to the intergenerational responsibility.

DHDR Article 3 is dedicated to the duty and responsibility to protect the life of every member of the human family and ensure the survival of both present and future generations. That means “to take reasonable steps to help others whose lives are threatened, or who are in extreme distress or need”. A key element of the formulation of the DHDR has been the present duty and responsibility for the potential consequences of our actions for the future generations. “The rights of these future generations are the duties of present generations” summarises Federico Mayor, the then Director General of UNESCO. Therefore, the right to peace and the right to live in a balanced ecological environment have to be recognized and guaranteed. In a broader sense, the Earth Charter, a declaration of principles for a sustainable world, emphasises the urgency of sharing responsibility for caring for the community of life, including the well-being of the human family.

DHDR Article 4 enunciates the duty and responsibility to promote collective security and a culture of peace of all members of the global community. War and conflict prevention, fostering international peace, global security and cooperation are needed for this purpose. The responsibility of States, according to UN Chapter 7, is underlined and also their duty strengthening mediation, conflict prevention, and post-conflict peace-building mechanisms and peace-keeping capacities.

DHDR Article 5 is dedicated to the duty and responsibility to promote rapid and effective disarmament in the interests of peace. Primarily the States are in charge of reducing military expenditure in favour of human development, and together with no-States actors to carry our nuclear disarmament, to cease any production or use of all chemical and biological weapons, and use of landmines.

The Duty to intervene to prevent gross human rights violations is stated in the DHDR Article 6 that means the commission of genocide, crimes against humanity, war crimes and other gross or systematic human rights abuses in all circumstances. States are mainly in charge of preventing and also punishing such violations, and there is also a collective duty of the States to intervene in the case where individual State fails to prevent such abuses. UN Chapter 7 remains general framework for this responsibility. For defining gross human rights violations and the need of prevention and punishment this chapter has been inspired by the Rome Statute that was adopted some months before this Declaration was finalised.

DHDR Article 7 enunciates the duty and responsibility unconditionally and in all circumstances to respect international humanitarian law during times of armed conflict. This law, obligates government forces, insurgents, and military or paramilitary forces, to refrain from committing acts of genocide; crimes against humanity, and war crimes, as mass killing, torture or rape.

The focus of DHDR Article 8 is the duty and responsibility of humanitarian assistance and intervention to those in need. In a globalised world with millions of displaced people, it is claimed for the adequate provision of food, shelter, health care and other essential requirements for survival to ensure the right to life for everyone in the world.

DHDR Article 9 finishes this chapter with the duty and responsibility to protect and promote a safe, stable and healthy environment, promoting respect, protection and preservation of the uniqueness and diversity of all forms of life. An adequate use of resources avoiding excessive exploitation and consumption, collaborative scientific research and exchange of information are required. This article is similar to the Kyoto Protocol, an international and legally binding agreement to reduce greenhouse gases emissions worldwide, an urgent change of attitude towards the environment. This duty for the present and future generations has already been confirmed by a broad scientific consensus on the existence of climate change and human responsibility.

== DHDR Chapter 3: Human security and an equitable international order ==
DHDR Article 10 emphasises the duty and responsibility to promote an equitable international order for the universal enjoyment of sustainable human, economic, social, cultural, political, scientific and technological development and equitable participation in the decision-making processes for an interdependent and technologically well equipped world, providing an extensive vision of the general formulation of the UDHR Article 28: “Everyone is entitled to a social and international order in which the rights and freedoms set forth in this Declaration can be fully realized”. The DHDR statements are categorical: “Economic policies and development should not be pursued at the expense of human rights or social development” (6), “Economic and social development shall not be pursued at the expense of the environment and natural resources” (7), and “As sovereign and equal members of the international community, all States have the right to participate fully, equitably and effectively in international and global institutions and decision-making processes…(8)” Coincidentally to the DHDR proposals, the “millennium development goals” of the MD set an agenda for a global partnership to fight poverty and establishing shared goals for a better world by 2015. Their fulfillment is measurable by progress at a quantitative level.

Following the previous article, DHDR Article 11 enunciates the duty to alleviate usurious debt that would endanger human lives and impede economic and social development.

This Chapter continues with DHDR Article 12 dedicated to the duty and responsibility to promote safe, responsible and equitable scientific and technological development for the benefit of all humankind. The UNESCO spirit of encouraging universally intellectual and moral solidarity is emphasised, in particular taking into account the condition of the lesser scientifically advanced States. This DHDR approach reinforces fully the importance of the recent UNESCO ethical documents for biosciences, and also other efforts for codifying ethical principles for the use of science.

DHDR Article 13 enunciates duties and responsibilities of public and private sector corporations, indicating as common criteria the respect for the sovereignty of host countries and simultaneously fully respect and promotion of universal human rights and international labour standards. For having an ethical code of the corporations and for promoting a more sustainable and inclusive global economy, the then UN Secretary-General, Kofi Annan, has proposed the Global Compact, an international initiative bringing companies together with UN agencies, labour and civil society to support universal environmental and social principles, that was finally launched in 2000.

DHDR Article 14 enunciates the duty and responsibility to prevent and punish international and organised crime as a shared task of the members of the global community. This article also has the innovative approach of global cooperation of the Statute of Rome, for combating of international crimes, transnational crimes and organised crime and assisting international criminal tribunals.

The focus of DHDR Article 15 is the duty and responsibility to eradicate corruption and build an ethical society in both the public and private sectors, implementing codes of conduct and training programmes, and promoting accountability, transparency public awareness of the harm caused by corruption. This emphasis of a code of ethics was also encouraged by the Global Compact, in particular for the private sector.

== DHDR Chapter 4: Meaningful participation in public affairs ==
DHDR Article 16 expresses the duty and responsibility to ensure meaningful participation in public affairs, for ensuring that the authority of government is based upon the will of the people and the rule of law. This promoted participation reiterates the universal right to take part in the government of his country, directly or through freely chosen representatives of the UDHR Article 21 at different levels, in local, national and global governance.

== DHDR Chapter 5: Freedom of opinion, expression, assembly, association and religion ==
Following the content of the UDHR Article 16 on the right to freedom of opinion and expression, DHDR Article 17 reformulates the duty and responsibility to respect and ensure freedom of opinion, expression, and the media, providing concrete measures for the world today, affirming the pursuit of truth as unhindered, and condemning any degrading treatment of individuals and the presentation of violence as entertainment. And Article 17 also insists that "the media and journalists have a duty to report honestly and accurately to avoid incitement of racial, ethnic or religious violence or hatred. (see: Article 20 of the International Covenant on Civil and Political Rights)

DHDR Article 18 establishes duties and responsibilities concerning information and communications technologies with the aim of ensuring universal access to basic communication and information infrastructure and services. Similarly, UNESCO has already made a recommendation on information promoting universal access to cyberspace.

DHDR Article 19 enunciates the duty and responsibility to take all necessary steps to ensure the substantive realisation of the rights to free assembly and freedom of association.

Finally, DHDR Article 20 formulates the related duty and responsibility to respect and ensure freedom of religion, belief and conscience, and of having or not having a religion or belief.

== DHDR Chapter 6: The right to personal and physical integrity ==
DHDR Article 21 is focused on formulating the duty and responsibility to respect and ensure the physical, psychological and personal integrity of all members of the human family in all circumstances, including in situations of armed conflict, reformulating UDHR articles 10-12 dedicated to the rights to personal integrity and respect for privacy.

DHDR Article 22 enunciates the duty and responsibility to take all necessary measures to respect and ensure the right to personal liberty and physical security, primarily by the States, preventing arbitrary arrest and detention and ensuring that all arrests and detentions are carried out in accordance with universally recognised standards of fairness and due process.

DHDR Article 23 emphasises the duty and responsibility to prohibit and prevent slavery and institutions and practices similar to slavery and slave-like practices including child prostitution, child exploitation, enforced prostitution, debt bondage, serfdom, and other forms of enforced labour inconsistent with international law, punishing such practices; instituting effective controls to prevent the illegal trafficking of persons; creating greater public awareness through education of the human rights abuses associated with such practices. The UDHR Article 4 states that “no one shall be held in slavery or servitude; slavery and the slave trade shall be prohibited in all their forms”. Today slavery is still not eradicated from the world, although universally condemned.

DHDR Article 24 enunciates the duty and responsibility to condemn torture and to take all necessary measures to prevent torture, cruel, inhuman and degrading treatment or punishment, declaring criminal and punishing all acts of torture, cruel and inhuman and degrading treatment or punishment, enforcing strict controls over places and conditions of custody of persons deprived of their liberty. This enunciation specifies the duty for achieving the content of UDHR Article 5: “No one shall be subjected to torture or to cruel, inhuman or degrading treatment or punishment”.

DHDR Article 25: The duty and responsibility to condemn and to prevent and eradicate enforced disappearances declaring criminal and punishing all acts of forced disappearances, ensuring that persons deprived of their liberty are only held in officially recognised places of detention, and that they have adequate access to judicial officers, legal representation, medical personnel and family members during the course of their detention.

== DHDR Chapter 7: Equality ==
After trying to meet the major global challenges of our interdependent world that are affecting today humankind as a whole, DHDR Chapter 7 rethinks the principle of equality, such as stated in the first UDHR articles. Using a similar approach, UNESCO has already approved two meaningful documents promoting cultural diversity, the UNESCO Universal Declaration on Cultural Diversity (2001) and the Convention on the Protection and Promotion of the Diversity of Cultural Expressions (2005). DHDR Article 26 enunciates in general the duty to respect, ensure and promote the right to equal treatment and to eradicate discrimination in all its forms.

DHDR Article 27 states the duty and responsibility for the States, primarily, to respect and ensure the substantive equality of every member of the human family, not only ensuring equality before the law, but also taking positive action to prevent direct or indirect discrimination.

DHDR Article 28 enunciates the duty and responsibility to ensure substantive racial and religious equality. That means ensuring the effective enjoyment of all human rights and fundamental freedoms without discrimination on the basis of race, religion or ethnicity, and to condemn all forms of racial and religious discrimination and respect racial, ethnic and religious diversity; promoting equal opportunities for all.

DHDR Article 29 formulates the duty and responsibility to ensure sex and gender equality and the recognition of women's rights as human rights. In particular the States have to ensure the effective enjoyment of all human rights and fundamental freedoms without discrimination on the basis of sex or gender, promoting the equality in the representation and participation of women in the public and political life, the eradication of cultural, religious and social practices which discriminate against women; the economic empowerment of women and the recognition of the full legal capacity of women.

DHDR Article 30 is dedicated to the duty and responsibility to ensure the substantive equality of persons with a disability, and to ensure the enjoyment and exercise of all human rights and fundamental freedoms without discrimination on the basis of disability.

Some progress towards the accomplishment of this duty can be observed at international level. In March 2006, the UN Programme on Disability has been consolidated into the Secretariat for the Convention on the Rights of Persons with Disabilities.

== DHDR Chapter 8: Protection of minorities and indigenous peoples ==
Reinforcing the fulfillment of equality, the aim of Chapter 8 is to emphasise the need for protection of minorities and indigenous peoples. Both the global community and the States are considered by this Declaration as the major responsible parties, collectively and individually for ensuring the rights of these vulnerable groups.

DHDR Article 31 formulates the duty and responsibility to respect and protect the existence, identity and rights of national, ethnic, religious and linguistic minorities, giving the States a primary duty and responsibility to take adequate measures. The above referred efforts of the UNESCO for protecting the value of cultural diversity and cultural expressions are a reflection of this obligation.

DHDR Article 32 enunciates the duty and responsibility to respect, protect and promote the rights of indigenous peoples, in particular, their right to preserve, maintain and develop their identities and to protect their means of livelihood, in a general context of respect of universal human rights. Indigenous rights should be protected at a national level, but it is also needed that the international community collectively assumes their responsibility. The Declaration on the Rights of Indigenous Peoples was approved in September 2007 by the UN General Assembly in order to protect these rights universally.

== DHDR Chapter 9: Rights of the child and the elderly ==
Chapter 9 deals also with the implementation of the principle of equality taking into account the primary responsibilities of the States for children and elderly rights.

DHDR Article 33 emphasises the duty and responsibility to respect, protect and promote the rights of the child, following the content of the almost universally ratified UN Convention on the Right of the Child (1989) and aware, that although this document is shared broadly by the international community, today millions of children are still innocent victims of armed conflict, extreme poverty and hunger.

DHDR Article 34 is dedicated to the formulation of the duty and responsibility to promote and enforce the rights and well-being of the elderly, trying to ensure the full and effective enjoyment by elderly people of all human rights and fundamental freedoms without discrimination on the basis of age, and to respect the well-being, dignity and physical and personal integrity of the elderly. Although major efforts are being made by the United Nations, such as the International Year of Older Persons (1999) and the formulation of UN Principles addressing the independence, participation, care, self-fulfillment and dignity of older persons, and by regional and national efforts, there does not yet exist a recognised framework for securing their rights. Therefore, the DHDR contributes to enforcing the rights of the elderly.

== DHDR Chapter 10: Work, quality of life and standard of living ==
DHDR Chapter 10 complements the system of duties and responsibilities related to the right to work, quality of life and standard of living. To do that, the DHDR takes into account at the same time, the responsibility of the States and the shared responsibility of the world community in the context of the global interdependence.

DHDR Article 35 formulates the duty and responsibility to promote the right to justly remunerated work, following the statement of UDHR Article 23. Measures are proposed by the DHDR such as adopting policies designed to promote productive work, ensuring employment security - in particular, protection against arbitrary or unfair dismissal - and ensuring equality of opportunity and conditions of work.

DHDR Article 36 emphasises the duty and responsibility to promote quality of life and an adequate standard of living for all. Although in the UDHR Article 22 it states the States obligation of fulfilling “the economic, social and cultural rights indispensable for his dignity and the free development of his personality”, today our interdependent world is not free from hunger and there is not universal access to adequate food and clean water for everyone. The DHDR reiterates the shared responsibility for eradicating extreme poverty from the world, in particular if we consider the sufficiency of material resources for meeting this challenge. Similarly, but with a more pragmatic approach, the Millennium Development Goals (2000) establishes an intergovernmental agreement for realising globally human rights. These transitional goals indicate a course for implementing human rights in a continuous process with measurable criteria. However, it would be positive to promote a dialogue on the achievement and evolution of the achievement of those goals with the help of this systematised view on universal duties and responsibilities.

== DHDR Chapter 11: Education, arts and culture ==
DHDR Chapter 11 is dedicated to formulating duties and responsibilities on the promotion of education, arts and culture, major topics of the UNESCO, such as the programmes like “education for all” and its various instruments for securing adequate conditions for education and artistic and cultural activities.

DHDR Article 37 enunciates the duty and responsibility to promote and enforce the right to education, taking into account that illiteracy still affects millions of people in the developing countries. This is coincident with the already referred Millennium Development Goals.

DHDR Article 38 emphasises the duty and responsibility to foster arts and culture by the States and the global community in general, similar to the UNESCO statements.

== DHDR Chapter 12: Right to a remedy ==
DHDR finishes with Chapter 12 dedicated to the right to a remedy where a human right or fundamental freedom is threatened or has been violated.

The DHDR Article 39 enunciates the duty and responsibility, primarily of the States, to provide for and enforce effective national judicial, administrative, legislative and other remedies for these cases, in similarity with the UDHR Article 8.

This Chapter proposes in article 40 the duty to monitor and implement the Declaration of Human Duties and Responsibilities, by establishing tripartite councils composed of State, civil society and private sector representatives in cooperation with States, relevant civil society organisations, national, regional and international inter-governmental organisations.

The DHDR Article 41 contains a non-derogation clause where it states: “Nothing in this Declaration shall be interpreted as impairing or restricting the rights contained in the Universal Declaration of Human Rights and other international and regional human rights instruments.”

== See also ==
- Universal Declaration of Human Rights
- Responsibility to Protect
- International human rights instruments
- International human rights law
- Vienna Declaration and Programme of Action
- Freedom of speech
- See: Declaration of Human Duties and Responsibilities, Valencia 2000, Fundación Valencia Tercer Milenio
