= International Day of the Disappeared =

International observance, 30 August

- Type: International
- Date: August 30
- Next time: 30 August 2026
- Frequency: annual

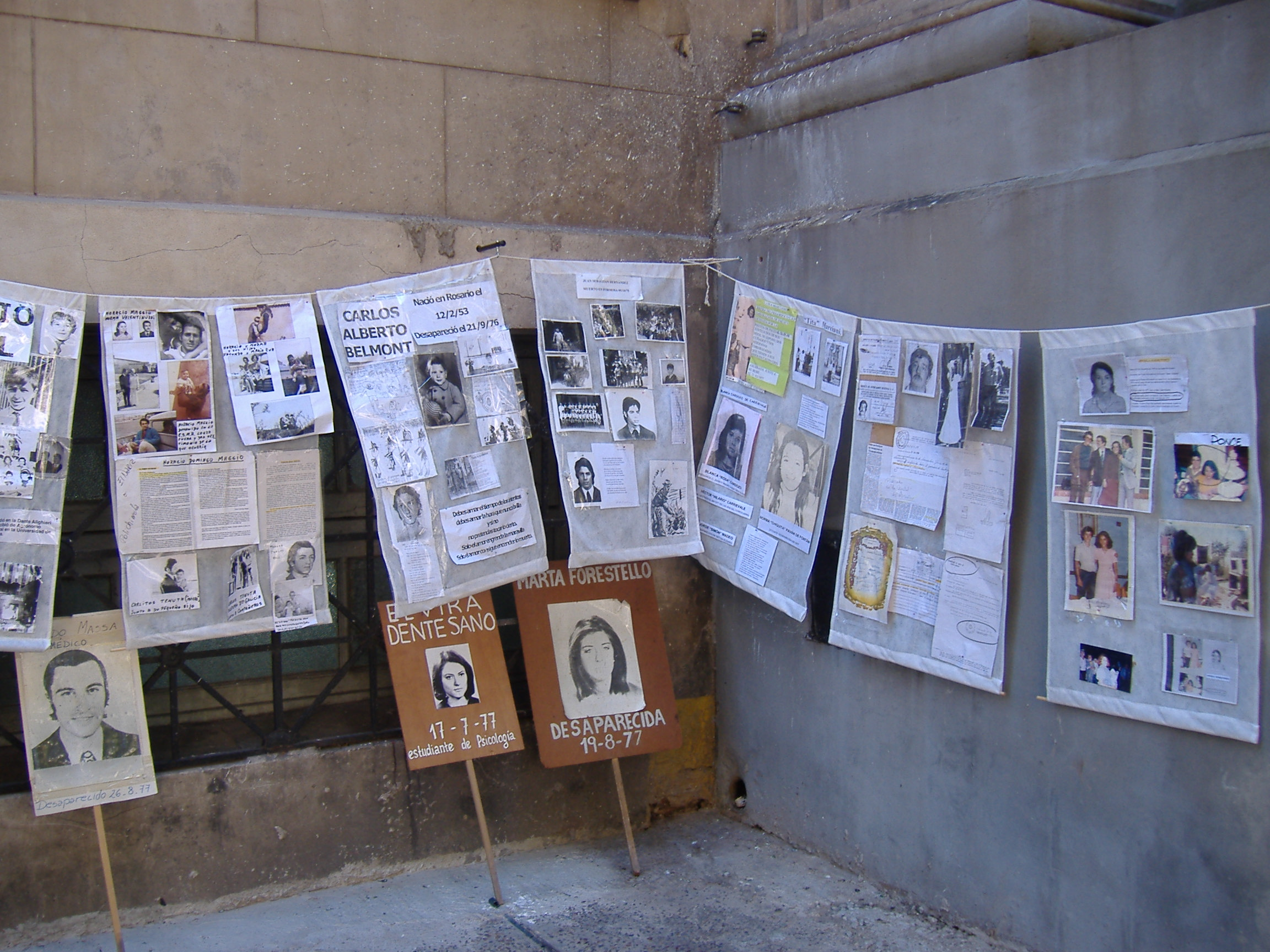
Newspaper clippings of desaparecidos (victims of forced disappearance) in Argentina

The International Day of the Disappeared, on August 30 of each year, is a day created to draw attention to the fate of individuals imprisoned at places and under poor conditions unknown to their relatives and/or legal representatives. The impulse for the day came from the Latin American Federation of Associations for Relatives of Detained-Disappeared (Federación Latinoamericana de Asociaciones de Familiares de Detenidos-Desaparecidos, or FEDEFAM), a non-governmental organization founded in 1981 in Costa Rica as an association of local and regional groups actively working against secret imprisonment, forced disappearances and abduction in a number of Latin-American countries.

Work on secret imprisonment is an important part of the activities for a number of international bodies and organizations in the fields of human rights activism and humanitarian aid, including for example Amnesty International (AI), the Office of the United Nations High Commissioner for Human Rights (OHCHR) and the International Committee of the Red Cross (ICRC). The International Day of the Disappeared is an opportunity to highlight these institutions' work, increase public awareness, and to call for donations and volunteers.

Of those agencies, the ICRC has additional privileges due to its special status as a non-governmental sovereign entity and its strict policy of neutrality. In some cases, the ICRC is the only institution granted access to specific groups of prisoners, thereby enabling a minimum level of contact and inspection of their treatment. For affected families, messages transmitted by the ICRC are often the only hint about the fate of these prisoners.

Visiting those detained in relation to conflicts and enabling them to restore and maintain contact with their families, is a very important part of the ICRC's mandate. But the definition of the Missing or the Disappeared goes far beyond the victims of enforced disappearance. It includes all those whose families have lost contact as the result of conflicts, natural disasters or other tragedies.

These missing may be detained, stranded in foreign countries, hospitalized or dead. Through its tracing services and working with the 189 national Red Cross and Red Crescent Societies around the world, the ICRC seeks to obtain information about their fate on behalf of their families. It reminds governments and other groups of their obligations to respect the families' right to know the fate of their loved ones. It also works with families of the missing to help them address their particular psychological, social legal and financial needs.

Imprisonment under secret or uncertain circumstances is a grave violation of some conceptions of human rights as well as, in the case of an armed conflict, of International Humanitarian Law. The General Assembly of the United Nations adopted a Declaration on the Protection of all Persons from Enforced Disappearance as resolution 47/133 on December 18, 1992. It is estimated that secret imprisonment is practiced in about 30 countries. The OHCHR Working Group on Enforced or Involuntary Disappearances has registered about 46,000 cases of people who disappeared under unknown circumstances.

On August 30, 2007, hundreds of Philippine relatives and supporters of desaparecidos, mostly activists, missing after being abducted or killed by Philippine security forces protested against the government to mark International Day of the Disappeared. Edita Burgos remembered her missing son, Jonas, a member of the Peasants' Movement of the Philippines.

On August 30, 2008, the International Coalition against Enforced Disappearances, which gathers family member organizations and human rights organizations from around the world, joined hands for a global campaign event to promote the ratification of the International Convention for the Protection of All Persons from Enforced Disappearance.
