= International Convention for the Protection of All Persons from Enforced Disappearance =

International law prohibiting abduction by a state

International Convention for the Protection of All Persons from Enforced Disappearance (ICPPED)
- Parties and signatories to the ICPPED: State party Signatory that has not ratified Neither state party nor signatory
- Type: United Nations General Assembly Resolution
- Drafted: 29 June 2006
- Signed: 6 February 2007
- Location: Paris
- Effective: 23 December 2010
- Condition: 32 ratifications
- Signatories: 98
- Parties: 78
- Depositary: Secretary-General of the United Nations
- Languages: Arabic, Chinese, English, French, Russian, Spanish

The International Convention for the Protection of All Persons from Enforced Disappearance (ICPPED) is an international human rights instrument of the United Nations intended to prevent forced disappearance, which, as defined in international law, is part of crimes against humanity. The text was adopted by the United Nations General Assembly on 20 December 2006 and opened for signature on 6 February 2007. It entered into force on 23 December 2010. As of August 2026, 98 states have signed the convention and 78 have ratified or acceded to it.

== Genesis ==
Following a General Assembly resolution in 1992 containing a 21 article declaration about enforced disappearance, and its resolution of 1978 requesting that recommendations be made, the Commission on Human Rights established an "inter-sessional open-ended working group to elaborate a draft legally binding normative instrument for the protection of all persons from enforced disappearance" in 2001.

The Group concluded its work in 2006 and its draft international convention was adopted by the Human Rights Council on 29 June 2006, and welcomed the offer by France to host the signing ceremony.

On 20 December 2006, the General Assembly adopted without a vote the text of the Convention and opened it for signature at the signing ceremony in Paris.

== Summary ==
The convention is modelled heavily on the United Nations Convention Against Torture.

"Enforced disappearance" is defined in Article 2 of the Convention as

the arrest, detention, abduction or any other form of deprivation of liberty by agents of the State or by persons or groups of persons acting with the authorization, support or acquiescence of the State, followed by a refusal to acknowledge the deprivation of liberty or by concealment of the fate or whereabouts of the disappeared person, which place such a person outside the protection of the law.

Article 1 of the Convention further states that

No exceptional circumstances whatsoever, whether a state of war or a threat of war, internal political instability or any other public emergency, may be invoked as a justification for enforced disappearance.

The widespread or systematic use of enforced disappearance is further defined as a crime against humanity in Article 5.

Parties to the convention undertake to:

- investigate acts of enforced disappearance and bring those responsible to justice;
- ensure that enforced disappearance constitutes an offence under its criminal law;
- establish jurisdiction over the offence of enforced disappearance when the alleged offender is within its territory, even if they are not a citizen or resident;
- cooperate with other states in ensuring that offenders are prosecuted or extradited, and to assist the victims of enforced disappearance or locate and return their remains;
- respect minimum legal standards around the deprivation of liberty, including the right for imprisonment to be challenged before the courts;
- establish a register of those currently imprisoned, and allow it to be inspected by relatives and counsel;
- ensure that victims of enforced disappearance or those directly affected by it have a right to obtain reparation and compensation. (Article 24. 4)
- the right to obtain reparation covers material and dangers and, where appropriate, other forms of reparation such as; a) Restitution. b) Rehabilitation. c) Satisfaction, including restoration of dignity and reparation. d) Guarantee of non-repetition. (Article 24. 5)

The Convention will be governed by a Committee on Enforced Disappearances elected by its parties. It is authorized to review state reports (Art. 29), conduct country visits (Art. 33), and initiate independent investigations (Art. 34). Parties are obliged to report to this committee on the steps they have taken to implement it within two years of becoming subject to it.

The Convention includes an optional complaints system whereby citizens of parties may appeal to the Committee for assistance in locating a disappeared person. Parties may join this system at any time, but may only opt out of it upon signature.

== Reservations ==
=== New Zealand ===
While the New Zealand government supports the Convention and joined the consensus leading to its adoption, it retains significant concerns around inconsistencies between the convention and established international law. These include the definition of enforced disappearance as a crime against humanity in Article 5, and the Article 6 provisions relating to command responsibility. According to an MFAT spokesperson, New Zealand "has no immediate plans" to sign or ratify the Convention.

=== United Kingdom ===
The United Kingdom stated its position during the discussion that followed the adoption of the General Assembly resolution on several technical points about the Convention. For example, on Article 18, which sets out the minimum information that a lawyer or relative of a person deprived of liberty should have access to (such as when the arrest took place, who gave the order, and the health of the person), the ambassador explained that if the deprivation of liberty of a person was done legally according to the laws of the country, and was not an "enforced disappearance", then such information could be withheld from the relatives and legal counsel.

A question asked in Parliament about whether there was any intention to sign the Convention, resulted in the answer that the Government needed "to conduct a detailed analysis of the provisions of the treaty and their implications for implementation in order to determine the UK's position towards ratification".

=== United States ===
A question during the daily State Department Press briefing that coincided with the date of the signing ceremony resulted in the following exchange:

QUESTION: Did you notice that 57 countries signed a treaty today that would basically bar governments from holding secret detainees and the U.S. did not join?

MR. MCCORMACK: Yeah. This is—I understand that there is a Convention for the Protection of All Persons and Enforced Disappearances. And I know—I have some information on it here, George. I confess I don't have all the details. I do know that we participated in all the meetings that produced the draft. Beyond that, I can't give you specific reasons here from the podium as to why we didn't sign on to it. We've put out a public document that I can give you the citation for afterwards and it explains our reasons for not participating in the draft. But I think just as a general comment, clearly the draft that was put up for a vote or put for signature was not one that met our needs and expectations.

== Signatories and ratifications ==
The Convention attracted 57 signatures when opened for signature in Paris. Controversially, the United States did not sign, saying that it "did not meet our expectations". A number of European countries were not initial signatories to the convention; these included the United Kingdom, Spain, Italy, Germany, and the Netherlands. Spain, Italy, Germany and the Netherlands have subsequently signed and ratified the convention. The initial signatories were Albania, Algeria, Argentina, Austria, Azerbaijan, Brazil, Burkina Faso, Burundi, Congo, Croatia, France, Ghana, Guatemala, Haiti, Japan, Lithuania, Maldives, Moldavia, Morocco, Uganda, Senegal, Serbia, Sierra Leone, Macedonia, Chad, Tunisia, Vanuatu, Belgium, Bolivia, Bosnia Herzegovina, Cameroon, Cape Verde, Chile, Comoros, Costa Rica, Cuba, Cyprus, Finland, Grenada, Honduras, India, Kenya, Lebanon, Luxembourg, Madagascar, Mali, Malta, Mexico, Monaco, Mongolia, Montenegro, Niger, Paraguay, Portugal, Samoa, Sweden, and Uruguay.

As of August 2024, 76 states have ratified or acceded to the convention.

== International Campaign for the Convention ==
The International Coalition against Enforced Disappearances (ICAED) is a global network of organisations of families of disappeared and NGO's campaigning in a nonviolent manner against the practice of enforced disappearances at the local, national and international level. The ICAED was founded in 2007 as a result from the 25-year-long struggle of families of disappeared and human rights defenders for an international legally binding instrument against enforced disappearances. The primary purpose of the ICAED is working together towards early ratification and effective implementation of the International Convention for the Protection of all Persons from Enforced Disappearances. Amnesty International is campaigning for Costa Rica, Pakistan, East Timor, Burundi, Portugal, Morocco, Lebanon, Cape Verde, Serbia, and Paraguay to ratify the convention.

== See also ==
- United Nations Convention Against Torture
- Forced disappearance
- Saturday Mothers
- Crimes against humanity
- International Day of the Disappeared
- International human rights law
- Operation Condor
- Inter-American Convention on Forced Disappearance Persons
