= Declaration on the Rights of Disabled Persons =

Declaration adopted in 1975 by the United Nations General Assembly

The Declaration on the Rights of Disabled Persons is a human rights declaration of the General Assembly of the United Nations, made on 9 December 1975. It is the 3447th resolution made by the Assembly.

As a resolution of the Assembly, it is not binding on member nations, but it forms a framework that may be drawn on for the purposes of international and domestic law.

It consists of a lengthy preamble, and thirteen proclamations that broadly promote the rights of those with disabilities.

In 2007 the Convention on the Rights of Persons with Disabilities was adopted.

== Proclamations ==
The Declaration makes thirteen distinct proclamations:

1. Definition of the term "disabled person" as "any person unable to ensure by himself or herself, wholly or partly, the necessities of a normal individual and/or social life, as a result of deficiency, either congenital or not, in his or her physical or mental capabilities".
2. Assertion that these rights apply to all disabled persons "without any exception whatsoever and without distinction or discrimination on the basis of race, colour, sex, language, religion, political or other opinions, national or social origin, state of wealth, birth or any other situation applying either to the disabled person himself or herself or to his or her family".
3. Right to respect for human dignity.
4. Right to same civil and political rights as other human beings.
5. Right to measures designed to enable self-reliance.
6. Right to medical, psychological and functional treatment as necessary.
7. Right to economic and social security, including the right to employment.
8. Right to have consideration of special needs at all stages of economic and social planning.
9. Right to live with their families or with foster parents and to participate in all social, creative or recreational activities.
10. Right to protection against exploitation, discrimination, and abuse.
11. Right to qualified legal aid.
12. Right to consult organizations of disabled persons for in matters of concern.
13. Right to be fully informed of the rights proclaimed in the Declaration.
