= International Coalition against Enforced Disappearances =

- Logo
- Headquarters: Geneva, Switzerland
- Type: International organisation
- Membership: 53 member organisations
- Website https://www.icaed.org/home/

The International Coalition against Enforced Disappearances (ICAED) gathers organizations of families of disappeared and human rights NGOs working in a nonviolent manner against the practice of enforced disappearances at the local, national and international level.

The ICAED is promoting the early ratification and effective implementation of the International Convention for the Protection of All Persons from Enforced Disappearance, which was adopted by the United Nations General Assembly on December 20, 2006. It was opened for signature on 6 February 2007 and entered into force on 23 December 2010. As of March 2015, 94 states have signed the convention and 46 have ratified it.

The ICAED was founded officially in September 2007 during a side event to the Human Rights Council session in Geneva. The ICAED forms the next phase in the international cooperation of all those working towards better protection from enforced disappearances. The Latin American federation of family member organisations FEDEFAM debated the possible project of a convention already in their 1982 congress in Lima. In that same year several eminent lawyers, such as Eduardo Novoa Monreal of Chile and Alfredo Galletti of Argentina, drafted the first text for a Convention against enforced disappearances.

During the negotiations for the convention from 2001 to 2003 in Geneva in the 'Open ended working group to draft a legally binding instrument for the protection of all persons from enforced disappearance' family members of disappeared from all continents and international human rights NGOs such as Amnesty International, Human Rights Watch, International Commission of Jurists and FIDH cooperated on an ad hoc basis to convince UN member States to adopt the strongest possible text.

After the adoption of the text by this working group on September 23, 2005, and later the adoption of the General Assembly the attention shifted from the level of the United Nations to the national level. Ratification by all governments was the next phase. Because of the ambiguous position of some governments towards the convention, the ICAED was founded to organise an international campaign for the convention.

By May 2015 the ICAED has 53 member organisations that come from all around the world. National campaigns for the Convention have been developed in various countries. The Country by Country Ratification Campaign, which was launched in March 2009 with successful actions on Morocco, is the latest of the joined activities of the coalition members.
