= Inter-American Convention to Prevent and Punish Torture =

1985 treaty created to prevent torture

IACPPT
Inter-American Convention to Prevent and Punish Torture
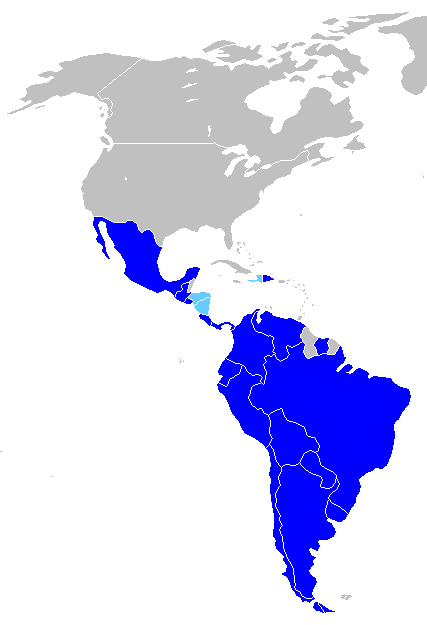
- Ratified the convention Signed, but has not ratified the convention
- Signed: 9 December 1985
- Location: Cartagena de Indias, Colombia
- Effective: 28 February 1987
- Condition: 2 ratifications
- Signatories: 20
- Parties: 18
- Depositary: General Secretariat of the Organization of American States
- Languages: English, French, Portuguese, and Spanish

The Inter-American Convention to Prevent and Punish Torture (IACPPT) is an international human rights instrument, created in 1985 within the Western Hemisphere Organization of American States and intended to prevent torture and other similar activities.

The Inter-American Convention entered into force on February 28, 1987, and, as of 2013, 18 nations are party to it, with another two having signed but not yet ratified.

The Inter-American Convention defines torture more expansively than the United Nations Convention Against Torture, including "the use of methods upon a person intended to obliterate the personality of the victim or to diminish his physical or mental capacities, even if they do not cause physical pain or mental anguish." The Convention is one of a series of OAS agreements that seek to protect human rights, within the framework of the American Convention on Human Rights, which bans torture in less detail.

The Convention also requires states to take effective measures to prevent torture within their borders, and creates an ability to extradite persons accused of torture.

== Signatory States ==
Before the 24 Articles of the Inter-American Convention to Prevent and Punish Torture are listed, the American States signatories are to state their awareness of the purpose of the convention, affirming that the convention is actually necessary, and concur that torture or cruel and inhuman treatment of any kind is inherently wrong and an act against human rights. This serves as a springboard for the rest of the convention, proving that all signatory states are in agreement about the main purpose of the Convention. The Commission has also stated multiple times that it is a signatory state's duty to prevent incommunicado detention, and to strive to be aware and knowledgeable of what happens to its prisoners and those stripped of their liberties to ensure that they are not tortured. Failure to do so would be an infringement against the Torture Conventions Article Five which ensures that a State creates conditions that prevents an individual from undergoing torture and punishes those who initiate or instigate such activities.

== Optional protocol ==
On December 18, 2002, the Optional Protocol to the Convention Against Torture and other Cruel, Inhuman, or Degrading Treatment or Punishment was adopted and sponsored by the United Nations. An optional protocol adds to or elaborates upon the treaty it is associated with. Unlike the Inter-American Convention to Prevent and Punish Torture, this protocol issued that places where people are stripped of their liberties be visited by other independent international and national bodies. This would ultimately address the countries in violation of the Convention to work toward a consensus regarding said issue.

== American Convention on Human Rights of 1969 ==
The Organization of American States' (O.A.S.) main convention, the American Convention on Human Rights, has a small section within its chapters skimming over the issue of torture. The American Convention on Human Rights was adopted at the Inter-American Specialized Conference on Human Rights in Costa Rica on November 22, 1969. Within Article Five of its second chapter on civil and political rights the convention states that no person shall be tortured and that people deprived of their liberty, such as those who are imprisoned, shall not be subject to such treatment either.

=== UN Convention to Prevent Torture Comparison ===
Like the Inter-American Convention to Prevent Torture, the UN Convention outlines that its goal is not to outlaw all torture everywhere, but to make sure that the countries under the UN follow the Articles agreed upon during the convention. The Convention's main purpose is to strengthen opposition and prohibition of torture globally through its support of allied countries and states.

== See also ==
- Command responsibility
- Inter-American Commission on Human Rights
- International human rights law
- Torture by proxy
- Use of torture since 1948
