= Regional Council on Human Rights in Asia =

First Organization to Execute a Human Rights Declaration in Asia

RCHRA
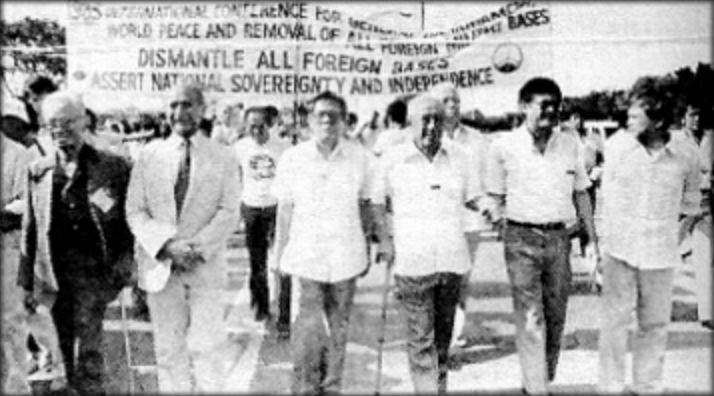
- Founders Jose W. Diokno (center) and J.B.L. Reyes (left)
- Founded: February 18, 1982; 44 years ago
- Founder: Jose W. Diokno
- Founded at: Manila, Philippines
- Type: NGO
- Purpose: Human rights
- Headquarters: Manila, Philippines
- Region served: Asia
- Secretary General: Jose W. Diokno (1983-1987)
- Affiliations: World Organisation Against Torture; United Nations
- Website: RCHRA Declaration

The Regional Council on Human Rights in Asia (RCHRA) is a human rights non-governmental organization representing the region of Southeast Asia. It is the first Southeast Asian organization to sign and execute a basic declaration of human rights in Asia. It drafted the second oldest declaration in Asia after the 1922 human rights declaration written in a Japanese newspaper.

== Establishment and Integration ==
The RCHRA was founded on February 18, 1982 in Manila by Senator Jose W. Diokno, Supreme Court Associate Justice J.B.L. Reyes, former Chief Justice Roberto Concepcion, the young paralegal Arno V. Sanidad, and other human rights stalwarts from Thailand, Indonesia, Singapore, and Malaysia following a long series of discussions in Tagaytay City. The meeting was the culmination of an earlier meeting in Penang, Malaysia on November 1981. The group advocated for ending oppressive dictatorial regimes in Southeast Asia, including the Ferdinand Marcos dictatorship, the Suharto dictatorship, the military rule in Thailand, and other similar countries with authoritarian regimes or debilitated democracies. It decided to research on particular laws that allowed oppressive regimes to proliferate with impunity, in order to draft new laws that would be adopted by the respective governments of the member countries. Around this time, Diokno was also chosen to chair the first assembly of HURIDOCS in France. This allowed the council to open dialogue with other human rights organizations outside the Philippines.

== Declaration of the Basic Duties of ASEAN Peoples and Governments ==
On December 9, 1983, human rights lawyers representing the countries of the Philippines, Thailand, and Indonesia gathered in Manila to sign the first human rights declaration for the region of Southeast Asia called the "Declaration of the Basic Duties of ASEAN Peoples and Governments." The goal of the council was to encourage ratification of this declaration and international human rights covenants, as well as to help the oppressed by redressing human rights violations in different international and domestic courts.

Article I focuses on the ICCPR and discusses basic principles. Article V focuses on social justice and labor rights, as well as adequate access to justice for the urban poor. It was also one of the first instruments to address mass communication via Article VII. Articles IX to XI focus on dictatorships and how to delegitimize these, and remedy human rights violations against torture.

The declaration also offers other novel ideas such as its direct reference to collective responsibilities and liabilities of the government, rather than the basic human rights already promoted in international human rights instruments. The tone is more litigation-specific and defiant of struggling governments but briefly rests its provisions on discussions of traditional civil rights principles.

== Notable members ==
- Roberto Concepcion, Philippine Chief Justice
- Jose W. Diokno, Philippine senator
- J.B.L. Reyes, Philippine Supreme Court Associate Justice
- Arno Sanidad, RCHRA representative to the 1990 UNCHR conference
