= Inter-American Convention on the Elimination of all Forms of Discrimination Against Persons with Disabilities =

Regional human rights treaty

Inter-American Convention on the Elimination of All Forms of Discrimination Against Persons with Disabilities
- Signed: 8 June 1999
- Location: Guatemala City, Guatemala
- Effective: 14 September 2001
- Condition: 6 ratifications
- Signatories: 20
- Parties: 19
- Depositary: General Secretariat of the Organization of American States
- Languages: English, French, Portuguese, and Spanish

The Inter-American Convention on the Elimination of All Forms of Discrimination Against Persons with Disabilities is a regional human rights instrument, adopted in 1999 within the Organization of American States. It calls on states to facilitate the full integration of persons with disabilities into society through legislation, social initiatives and educational programmes. It entered into force on 14 September 2001.

As of 2013, 19 states have ratified the convention.

== See also ==
- American Convention on Human Rights
- UN Convention on the Rights of Persons with Disabilities
