= International Bill of Human Rights =

UN General Assembly resolution

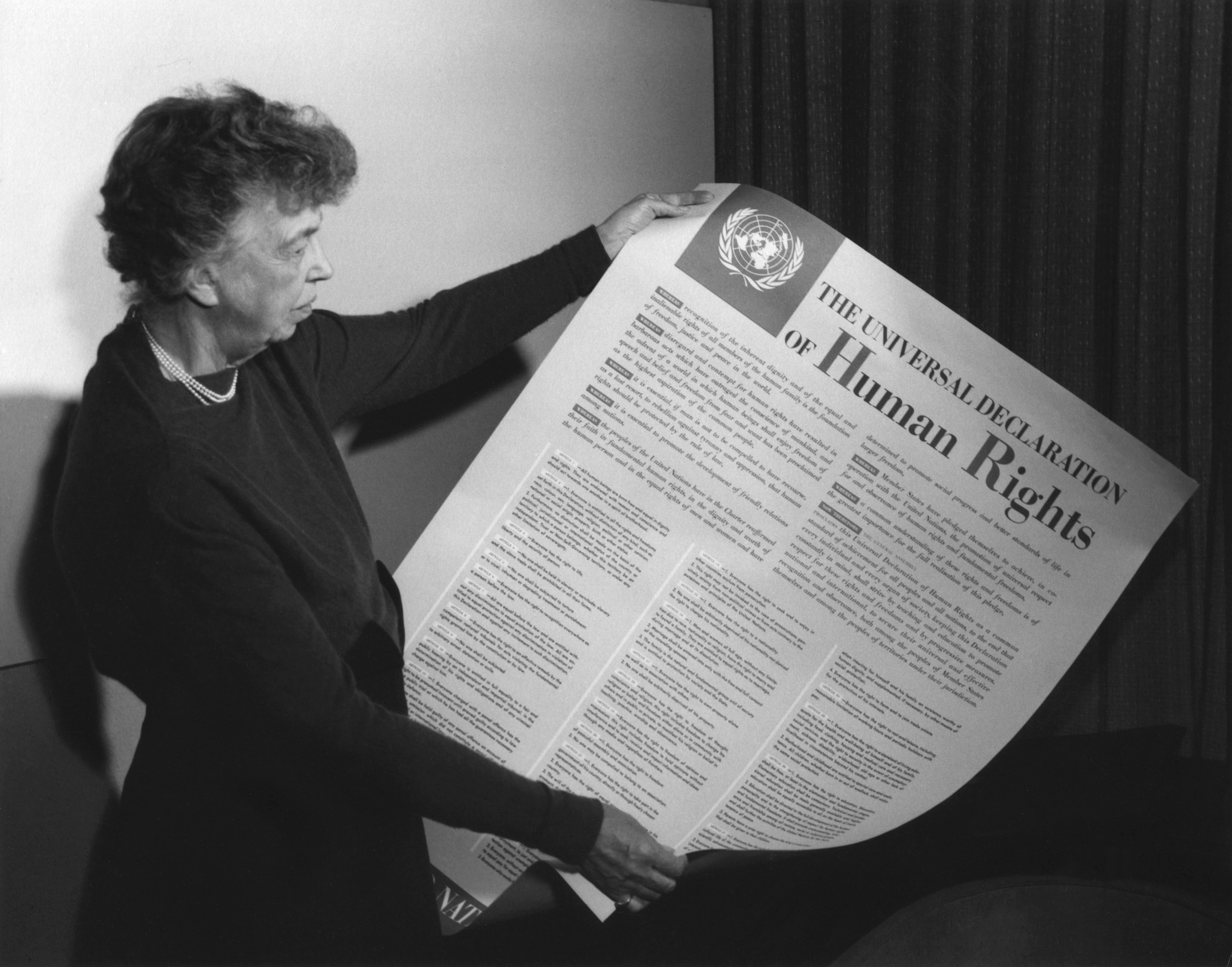
Eleanor Roosevelt holding the Universal Declaration of Human Rights, 1949.

The International Bill of Human Rights was the name given to UN General Assembly Resolution 217 (III) and two international treaties established by the United Nations. It consists of the Universal Declaration of Human Rights (adopted in 1948), the International Covenant on Civil and Political Rights (ICCPR, 1966) with its two Optional Protocols and the International Covenant on Economic, Social and Cultural Rights (ICESCR, 1966). The two covenants entered into force in 1976, after a sufficient number of countries had ratified them.

In the beginning, different views were expressed about the form the bill of rights should take. In 1948, General Assembly planned the bill to include UDHR, one Covenant and measures of implementation. The Drafting Committee decided to prepare two documents: one in the form of a declaration, which would set forth general principles or standards of human rights; the other in the form of a convention, which would define specific rights and their limitations.

Accordingly, the Committee transmitted to the Commission on Human Rights draft articles of an international declaration and an international convention on human rights. At its second session, in December 1947, the Commission decided to apply the term "International Bill of Human Rights" to the series of documents in preparation and established three working groups: one on the declaration, one on the convention (which it renamed "covenant") and one on implementation. The Commission revised the draft declaration at its third session, in May/June 1948, taking into consideration comments received from Governments. It did not have time, however, to consider the covenant or the question of implementation. The declaration was therefore submitted through the United Nations Economic and Social Council to the General Assembly, meeting in Paris.

Later the draft covenant was divided in two (as decided by the General Assembly in 1952), differing with both catalogue of rights and degree of obligations – for example, the ICESCR refers to the "progressive realisation" of the rights it contains. In 1998, it was hailed as "A Magna Carta for all humanity".
