= Inter-American Convention on Forced Disappearance of Persons =

Inter-American Convention on The Forced Disappearance of Persons
- Signed: 9 June 1994
- Location: Belem do Para, Brazil
- Effective: 28 March 1996
- Condition: 2 ratifications
- Signatories: 16
- Parties: 15
- Depositary: General secretariat of the Organization of American States
- Languages: Spanish, English, Portuguese and French

The Inter-American Convention on The Forced Disappearance of Persons is a treaty of the Organization of American States (OAS) intended to combat the forced disappearance of persons. The convention was adopted in 1994. Ratification is open to all members of the OAS and as of 2014, the convention has been ratified by 15 states. Violations of the convention can be brought to the Inter-American Commission on Human Rights.

As of 2014, the only state to have signed the convention but not ratified it is Nicaragua.
