= Anti anti-communism =

Opposition to anti-communism as applied in the Cold War

Anti anti-communism is opposition to anti-communism as applied in the Cold War. The term was coined in 1984 by Clifford Geertz and was meant to show that it was possible to criticize anti-communism, particularly its excesses like McCarthyism, without being a communist. For example, there were both liberal and conservative criticism of Cold War era anti-communism in countries like the United States.

In the post-Cold War era, the term came to include the analysis of scholars and journalists who argue that anti-communist narratives had exaggerated the repression and crimes of Communist states, that the criticism of Communist party rule should not be applied to communism as a whole or to other left-wing politics in order to discredit them and their criticism of capitalism (particularly neoliberal capitalism), and that the victims of Communism narrative (the body count of the deaths caused, directly or indirectly, by Communist governments) popularized by The Black Book of Communism has a double standard in that it could be equally applied to capitalism or to other systems and ideologies to reach the same if not bigger number of victims, and that in general there is a double standard in memory politics between the excesses of capitalism and those of Communist states.

Critics contend that anti anti-communism is an attempt to downplay Soviet espionage and the threat posed by communism, and that it is a form of whataboutism. Supporters respond that they are not downplaying the excesses and crimes of Communist states or rehabilitating real socialism but are trying to contextualize them within a comparative analysis of double standards.

== Definition ==
Clifford Geertz, an American anthropologist at the Institute for Advanced Study, defined anti anti-communism as being applied in "the cold war days" by "those who ... regarded the [Red] Menace as the primary fact of contemporary political life" to "[t]hose of us who strenuously opposed [that] obsession, as we saw it ... with the insinuation – wildly incorrect in the vast majority of cases – that, by the law of the double negative, we had some secret affection for the Soviet Union." Stated more simply by Kristen Ghodsee and Scott Sehon, "the anthropologist Clifford Geertz wrote that you could be 'anti anti-communism' without being in favour of communism."

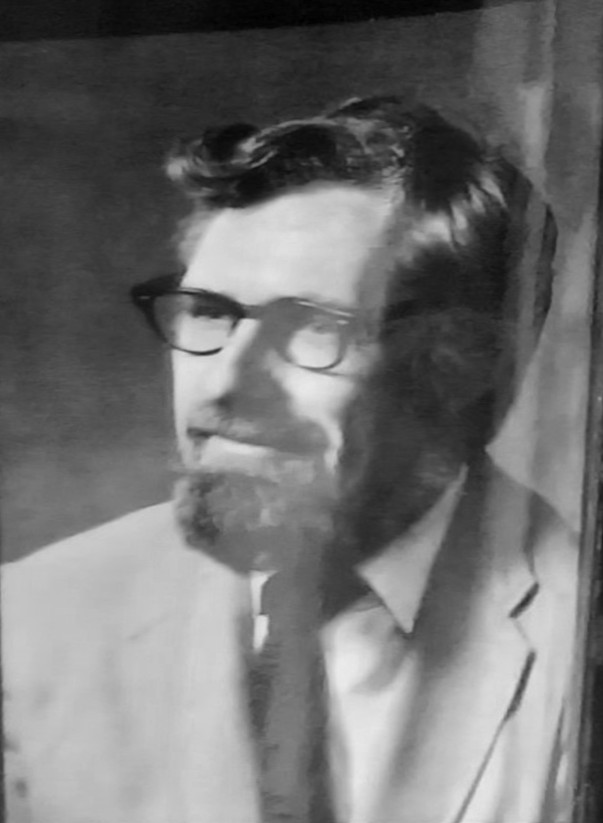
Clifford Geertz

In 1964, socialist historian Theodore Draper used anti anti-communism to refer to Fidel Castro and his consolidation of the Cuban Revolution, which preceded the Cuban–Soviet economic agreement of 1960. In a critique of Stephen F. Cohen, Jonathan Chait used a fully hyphenated form of the term in 2014, calling Cohen "an old-school leftist who has carried on the mental habits of decades of anti-anti-communism seamlessly into a new career of anti-anti-Putinism", referring to the use of whataboutism or what Chait calls "defense-by-implication" as a rhetorical strategy by RT commentators.

== Overview ==
=== Cold War era ===
In 1984 sociologist Albert Szymanski drew a comparison between the treatment of Soviet dissidents after Joseph Stalin's death and the treatment of dissidents in the United States during the period of McCarthyism, arguing that "on the whole, it appears that the level of repression in the Soviet Union in the 1955 to 1980 period was at approximately the same level as in the United States during the McCarthy years (1947–1956)." John Lukacs was described as one of "anti-anticommunists among conservatives and their fellow travelers".

John Earl Haynes, who studied the Venona decryptions extensively, argued that Joseph McCarthy's attempts to "make anticommunism a partisan weapon" actually "threatened [the post-War] anti-Communist consensus", thereby ultimately harming anti-communist efforts more than helping them. Harry S. Truman called McCarthy "the greatest asset the Kremlin has". Liberal anti-communists like Edward Shils and Daniel Patrick Moynihan had a contempt for McCarthyism. Shils criticized an excessive policy of secrecy during the Cold War, leading to the misdirection of McCarthyism, which was addressed during the Moynihan Commission (1994–1997). As Moynihan put it, "the reaction against McCarthy took the form of a modish anti-anti-Communism that considered impolite any discussion of the very real threat Communism posed to Western values and security." After revelations of Soviet spy networks from the declassified Venona project, Moynihan wondered: "Might less secrecy have prevented the liberal overreaction to McCarthyism as well as McCarthyism itself?" In 1998, Geoffrey Wheatcroft criticized certain aspects of anti-anti-communism. He suggested that "one mark of the true anti-anti-communist is an evasive use of language", such as downplaying historical Soviet espionage.

Chomsky observed double standards in his criticism of The Black Book of Communism. In outlining economist Amartya Sen's research on hunger that while India's democratic institutions prevented famines, its excess of mortality over Communist China, potentially attributable to the latter's more equal distribution of medical and other resources, was nonetheless close to four million per year for non-famine years. Chomsky argued that if the same methodology of The Black Book of Communism was applied to India, then "the democratic capitalist 'experiment' has caused more deaths than in the entire history of ... Communism everywhere since 1917: over 100 million deaths by 1979, and tens of millions more since, in India alone." At an April 2017 conference at the University of Bern called "Anti-Communist persecutions in the 20th Century", American historian Ronald Grigor Suny suggested that the panel write "The Black Book of Anti-Communism", referencing the controversial The Black Book of Communism.

=== Post-Cold War era ===
Several contemporary academics and journalists argue that anti-communist narratives have exaggerated the extent of political repression and censorship in Communist states or have drawn comparisons with what they see as atrocities that were perpetrated by capitalist states, particularly during the Cold War. Among them are Mark Aarons, Vincent Bevins, Noam Chomsky, Jodi Dean, Kristen Ghodsee, Seumas Milne, Michael Parenti, and Salvatore Engel-Di Mauro.

In her 2012 book The Communist Horizon, Dean argued that there is a double standard among all sides of the political spectrum, including conservatives, liberals, and social democrats, in how communism and capitalism are perceived nearly two decades after the dissolution of the Soviet Union. Dean stated that the worst excesses of capitalism are often minimized, while communism is often equated only with the Soviet Union, and experiments in Eastern Europe, Latin America, Africa, and Asia are often ignored, with an emphasis placed on the Stalin era and its violent excesses including gulags, purges, droughts and famines, and almost no consideration for the industrialization and modernization of the Soviet economy, the successes of Soviet science (such as the Soviet space program), or the rise in the standard of living for the once predominantly agrarian society. The dissolution of the Soviet Union is therefore seen as the proof that communism cannot work, allowing for all left-wing criticism of the excesses of neoliberal capitalism to be silenced, for the alternatives would supposedly inevitably result in economic inefficiency and violent authoritarianism.

Other academics and journalists, such as Ghodsee and Milne, asserted that in the post-Cold War era any narratives including Communist states' achievements are often ignored, while those that focus exclusively on the crimes of Stalin and other Communist party leaders are amplified. Both allege this is done in part to silence any criticism of global capitalism. In Blackshirts and Reds: Rational Fascism and the Overthrow of Communism, Parenti holds that Communist regimes, as flawed as they were, nevertheless played a crucial role in "tempering the worst impulses of Western capitalism and imperialism", and criticized left-wing anti-communists in particular for failing to understand that in the post-Cold War era Western business interests are "no longer restrained by a competing system" and are now "rolling back the many gains that working people in the West have won over the years". Parenti adds that "some of them still don't get it." In their anti anti-communism article for Aeon, Ghodsee and Sehon conclude: "Responsible and rational citizens need to be critical of simplistic historical narratives that rely on the pitchfork effect to demonise anyone on the Left. We should all embrace Geertz's idea of an anti-anti-communism in hopes that critical engagement with the lessons of the 20th century might help us to find a new path that navigates between, or rises above, the many crimes of both communism and capitalism." In The Jakarta Method: Washington's Anticommunist Crusade and the Mass Murder Program that Shaped Our World, Bevins argues that anti-communist mass killings backed by the United States during the Cold War have been far more impactful on shaping the contemporary world than Communist mass killings have.

== See also ==
- Anti-capitalism
- Anti-fascism
- Anti-liberalism
