= CIA activities in Indonesia =

This is a list of activities carried out by the US Central Intelligence Agency in Indonesia.

== Indonesia, pre–World War II ==
Prior to World War II, Indonesia was a Dutch colony. The Dutch took control of the islands in the early 17th century and called it the Dutch East Indies. The Dutch held control over Indonesia until 1942, when the Japanese took control of the region. The Japanese controlled the region until 1945. In 1945, the Indonesians declared their independence from the Japanese empire. It took four years of rebellion and negotiations with the United Nations before the Netherlands finally recognized the independent status of Indonesia. The Dutch saw the US as a potential blocker in their attempts to regain control of the region, and the US had to play a large mediating role in Indonesia as they needed to appease the Dutch, the British, and the Indonesians themselves. This would prove difficult as the region became increasingly unstable during the period.

== Indonesia, 1945–1950 ==
=== Operation ICEBERG ===
After World War II, six weeks after the atomic bomb was dropped on Japan, President Truman on September 20, 1945, signed an executive order to abolish the Office of Strategic Services (OSS) which took effect on October 1, 1945, and temporarily the War Department was given control of the OSS branches that were still operational. Thus, departments were renamed to incorporate these new branches resulting in the Strategic Services Unit (SSU) and the Interim Research Intelligence Service (IRIS). These departments, along with military intelligence agencies, were put on the mission to collect information on surrendering Japanese troops and recovering military POWs and civilian internees. One recovery mission, known as Recovery of Allied Prisoners of War and Internees (RAPWI), had major complications because of the different approaches of the US, British, and Dutch allies. The humanitarian nature of these rescue missions provided cover for the CIA's real objective: to create a place to perform espionage in what would turn into the nation of Indonesia. The US did this out of fear for communist expansion in Southeast Asia, as it had already taken hold in the People's Republic of China. As Asia became a focal point for many conflicts, the native people of Indonesia came to realize that they were not helpless and their enemies were not invincible. Moreover, the US needed a "postwar central intelligence agency." According to the CIA online library, the US needed "a secret foreign intelligence service that preserved OSS's capacity to report 'information as seen through American eyes' and 'to analyze and evaluate the material for policymakers.' in southeast Asia".

At the time when operation ICEBERG was put into motion, Indonesia was still under control by the Dutch. Indonesians were against Dutch occupation as they had declared their independence in 1945. The U.S. had sympathy for the people of Indonesia and supported their independence. During this time, there was a violent four-year revolution in Indonesia that would eventually end with Indonesia free from Dutch Rule. In Batavia, the ICEBERG mission provided policymakers with information from the beginning of the revolution and how it evolved over the four-year battle.

Col. John G. Coughlin became the head of the planning of operation ICEBERG. He, along with the CIA, wanted to establish field stations in key cities such as Singapore, Saigon, and Batavia. Coughlin had an idea of four person teams each with specialists in espionage, counterintelligence, research and analysis that would make up the core of US intelligence stations across Southeast Asia. The stations' responsibilities included collecting information about Japanese war crimes, assessing the condition of U.S. property holdings, and accepting the surrender from the Japanese soldiers and commanders.

The Dutch did not want the US to establish an intelligence team in Batavia for many reasons. The first reason they argued was that it was not within "the sphere of influence" that the US had globally. The second reason they argued was that there was no need for the US to have intelligence there because they would only come up with the same intelligence that the Dutch and British had already acquired. The Dutch also stated that they along with the British would gladly inform the United States on anything they needed to know, but the British Southeast Asia Command (SEAC) had already given the go ahead for the US's participation in Batavia, so the Dutch were forced to allow the ICEBERG mission. Vice Adm. Lord Louis Mountbatten was the Supreme Allied Commander of SEAC and created a committee called "P" Division. The sole purpose of this division was to keep a watch on what the US was doing.

ICEBERG was commanded by OSS Major Frederick E. Crockett who arrived in Batavia on September 15, 1945, only one month after Japan intented to surrender and 13 days after Japan signed the instrument of surrender, which officially ended World War II. Crockett had traveled to Java aboard HMS Cumberland to head a two-teamed mission. Team A was located in the city of Batavia and their mission was espionage, counterintelligence, research and analysis, radio operations, and cryptography, and Team B was located in Singapore, and their mission was to be the backup to Team A if and when the time came.

Crockett also emphasized that the collecting of political and economic intelligence had to be carried out with extreme caution and a controlled nature. This was because the presence of the Dutch and British, whom he never had any intention of sharing his information with. Crockett only commanded the mission for a short period of time as the British asked for him to be removed. The British and the Dutch disapproved of the OSS's involvement in Indonesia and were in direct opposition to operation ICEBERG. The British successfully managed to remove Crockett from command after two months, citing that Crocket had been uncooperative to the SEAC. In Crockett's report, Crockett noted just the opposite: the SEAC had refused to give the OSS essential supplies, had commandeered OSS vehicles, and denied the OSS access to critical local fund. "Contrasted with wartime operations whereas an American unit we were recognized as a part of a team with a mutual objective," Crockett wrote in his conclusion about ICEBERG, "the Batavia mission could at no time be considered a joint and cooperative mission".

Director of the OSS, Major General William J. "Wild Bill" Donovan, was the mastermind behind operation ICEBERG. After World War II, General Donovan was of the opinion that the United States was behind other countries in terms of providing intelligence aimed at protecting and safeguarding the United States interest. On the back of this, Donovan informed President Truman that the United States required its own secret service agency to keep up with others and as a means to keep the United States adequately informed, towards the avoidance of surprise attacks and keep an eye on the Soviets' moves. Hence, the creation of the Office of the Secret Service.

At its inception, the OSS was primarily responsible for protecting the president from surprise attacks and assisting the United States in its Cold War struggle with the Soviets through the feeding of intelligence. However, through Donovan's orchestrations and vision, the OSS broadens its operation from the confines of providing secret service towards as direction of conducting covert and clandestine operations abroad. Coughlin had suggested to Donovan that the post war intelligence agency be much smaller than the OSS and employ only skilled agents. When the OSS officially disbanded in 1945, Donovan's intelligence career had officially ended. This being true, his ideas of a postwar intelligence agency had rooted themselves within stations in Southeast Asia. J. Edgar Hoover, FBI director, opposed Donovan's proposal of a postwar central intelligence agency because during the war, the OSS had become too close to the realm of responsibility occupied by military intelligence agencies, the FBI, and the State Department.

A major success of OSS intelligence came with the first American contact with Indonesian President Sukarno on September 27, 1945. Thanks to the Japanese occupation during WWII, the Indonesians were militarily trained and united as a country. Sukarno and his ministry promised their full support for the British occupation of Indonesia, but promised that if the Dutch attempted to occupy Indonesia, the Indonesians felt "capable of resorting to force if necessary in order to preserve their independence." This meeting, as well as other allied intelligence reports from around Java reporting resistance against the reinstatement of Dutch civil administration, surprised the British Southeast Asian Command (SEAC). The internal movement against the reinstatement of the Dutch government was far more widespread than the British or the Dutch had previously expected.

=== The liquidation of the OSS ===
Effective October 1, 1945, President Truman signed an executive order that would dismantle the OSS. The responsibilities of the Intelligence Agency were transferred to the war department and was renamed the Strategic Services Unit (SSU). The OSS Research and Analysis branch was taken over by the State Department and renamed the Interim Research Intelligence Service (IRIS). Truman wanted James F. Byrnes (Secretary of State) "to take lead in developing a comprehensive and coordinated foreign intelligence program." This idea was resisted by State Department officials because they were against a centralized organization.

Although there was a transfer in Washington happening, the change had little effect on the efforts in Batavia. The OSS was simply replaced with SSU, and the growth of operation continued. Robert A. Koke was the most important SSU intelligence officer operating within Indonesia and was conducting clandestine missions in Southeast Asia longer than any American Intelligence officer. His responsibilities included training OSS agents and accompanying them on submarine missions. While he was not a full-time member of the ICEBERG mission his contributions made him an invaluable member of operation RIPLEY I. Operation RIPLEY was a covert operation which was orchestrated by the CIA which aimed to destabilize the Sukarno government during the Cold War era. The goal of this operation was to cause division in Indonesian politics through media campaigns and supporting anti-communist groups. The CIA provided funding, training, and logistical support to opposition groups and paramilitary organizations opposed to Sukarno's rule, leveraging existing tensions and grievances to undermine the government's authority. Additionally, the operation also looked to exploit internal divisions within the Indonesian military and exploit economic vulnerabilities to weaken Sukarno's grip on power.

=== The fate of HUMPY ===
One of the objectives for operation ICEBERG was to discover the fate of J.F. Mailuku, an OSS wartime agent, who had been codenamed HUMPY. Mailuku studied engineering and eventually became an air force cadet in the colonial armed forces. Before the Dutch surrendered to the Japanese in 1942, Mailuku was evacuated to Australia, and from there he traveled to the United States. He was recruited and trained by the OSS and on June 23, 1944, he infiltrated Java via submarine for operation RIPLEY I.

Due to being detained temporarily by Japanese paramilitary forces, Mailuku was unable to attend a rendezvous with the OSS and therefore did not have contact with Americans during the war. Upon the arrival of the Cumberland, Mailuku was introduced to Crockett who was able to receive his reports. "An OSS summary of HUMPY's intelligence activities characterized his detailed reports as 'information of inestimable value.'"

Mailuku had substantiated other OSS reports of anti-Dutch sentiment, with Mailuku characterizing the sentiment as "violent." Dutch officials immediately continued to vehemently reject this notion. Mailuku also reported on the Indonesian people's collective desire for independence. Mailuku was last seen with an acquaintance who was supposedly working for Dutch intelligence before he disappeared. They had been scheduled to attend a meeting with Indonesian nationalists and never returned. It is widely believed that Mailuku was executed for his association with a Dutch agent, especially due to the lack of communication from Mailuku or any form of ransom demand.

=== Consequences of Dutch police action ===
By 1949, the Dutch launched a campaign to occupy its colonies once again, despite Sukarno's warnings. They used police in the region to assert control over the independent Indonesian government. The CIA released a report expressing concern with the actions of the Dutch police. It further conveyed the worry concerning how the circumstances might jeopardize economic activity and the reputation of the United Nations. The CIA feared how it might be used as an opportunity to unite the Asian countries against the United States or to be used by the Soviet Union as a propaganda tool. They also feared that the Dutch would set an example to countries such as Israel that they are capable of going against the security council. It was a moment where the colonial question came to the center of discussion at the international level.

== 1950s ==
Since the late 1950s, the CIA sought to thwart communism in Indonesia due to its proximity to Vietnam and China, the importance of its sea lanes and its oil industry, which was largely foreign run.

Sukarno, a fierce nationalist, became the first democratically elected President of Indonesia. He tried to balance the country's different regions, cultures, languages, religions, ideologies and political parties, including the Communist Party of Indonesia (PKI). Under Sukarno, the PKI became the largest communist party in the world outside of China and the Soviet Union, with well over 3 million active members. Sukarno himself was a nationalist, not a communist, but Sukarno also depended on the communist party, as it allowed him to mobilize mass support for his own political objectives much easier in the years on 1958–1959. In return, he would ban any "anti-communist" press and would restrain the army in order to help the PKI. In this delicate balancing act, Sukarno attempted to court both sides of the Cold War. Shortly after his visit to the United States in 1956, he visited both China and the Soviet Union. The United States interpreted these visits as Sukarno choosing the communist side. The PKI and army both operated independently and were in constant competition from the village level all the way up to capital city.

=== Military rebellion ===
The Indonesian government of Sukarno was faced with a major threat to its legitimacy beginning in 1956, when several regional commanders began to demand autonomy from Jakarta. After mediation failed, Sukarno took action to remove the dissident commanders.

In 1958, elements of the Indonesian military, with the support of the CIA, rebelled against the rule of President Sukarno. This attempted coup ended in failure. In February 1958, dissident military commanders in Central Sumatera (Colonel Ahmad Husein) and North Sulawesi (Colonel Ventje Sumual) declared the Revolutionary Government of the Republic of Indonesia-Permesta Movement aimed at overthrowing the Sukarno regime. They were joined by many civilian politicians from the Masyumi Party, such as Sjafruddin Prawiranegara, who were opposed to the growing influence of the communist party, the Partai Komunis Indonesia or PKI. President Sukarno, in an address to the UN after the failed coup, denounced imperialism and vowed he was determined not to let a small corner of the world to make a play thing of Indonesia.

=== CIA failed coup attempt of 1958 ===
Following President Eisenhower's September 25, 1957, order to the CIA to overthrow the Sukarno government, Soviet intelligence learned of the plans almost instantly, publicizing the "American Plot to Overthrow Sukarno" three days later in an Indian newspaper, Blitz, which Soviet intelligence controlled. Despite Soviet awareness, the CIA began planning the coup, and set up operational bases primarily in the Philippines. The CIA then employed veteran Filipino CIA paramilitary officers to make contact with Indonesian military forces on Sumatra and Sulawesi. Working in tandem with the Pentagon, deliveries of weapons packages were prepared for distribution to rebel military forces in Sumatra and Sulawesi. The CIA also financed rebel forces with radio stations that issued anti-Sukarno broadcasts in an act of psychological warfare. American involvement, which was meant to remain a secret, was discovered when an American pilot named Pope was shot down. In a dramatic unmasking, Pope was found to have his military identification card for the US Air Force and paperwork for the operation. Subsequent investigation also outed the Taiwanese C.A.T. company that Pope was an employee for as a CIA transport service. After this incident, communist activists used Western intervention as a main point in arguments for communist rule. The next political campaigns to occur would incite a propaganda battle to gain citizens' support.

In an effort to try to justify the interference by the United States, the CIA stated that in the time leading up to the coup, Indonesian economic development was severely impacted by the government's failure to unify the country. As a result, the outlying island population, which was responsible for most of the country's exports and tax revenues, became discontented with receiving little in return for their large contributions. In addition, the government began to nationalize foreign-owned plantations and mines, investing in the industries of rubber, copra, and tin. However, the facilities were noted to be ill-maintained, which ultimately harmed Indonesia's economy under Sukarno. The islands began to set up semi-autonomous governments until a rebellion finally broke out a year later, hindering production and devastating government revenues due to the loss of exports. An Indonesian geography fact vital to understanding the rebellion is that the rebelling states had economic resources, but did not have the cultural and political power that Jakarta had.

Back in the United States, at an OCB (Operations Coordination Board) Luncheon on January 8, 1958, the memorandum for the record states: "Mr. Dulles gave a brief report on the latest developments in Indonesia. He referred particularly to indications that the Bandung Council proposes to establish a Free Government of Indonesia and said that while he believes a move of this sort would be premature, there is little we can or should do to try and stop it. It was agreed it would be unwise to supply arms so long as the possibility exists that the government might become communist dominated."

Nevertheless, the dissidents of Sumatra were anticipated to issue a demand for the establishment of an anti-communist government on February 7, 1958, threatening that any denial of this demand would lead to a rival regime. Noting the dissident's deep distrust of Sukarno, prior proposals for compromise coming from the Djuanda Cabinet were rejected outright. Dissidents supported the Indonesian diplomatic missions in various countries including Singapore, South Vietnam, Malaya, and Italy. Given their resistance to prior proposals, an intelligence memo indicated that the rival regime was poised to proceed regardless of Sukarno's response. As such, these negotiations were viewed as Sukarno's stalling tactic in order to avoid the formation of the rival regime.

While the dissidents were poised to take action regardless of Sukarno's response to their demand, they still feared military attacks from Jakarta in the form of airstrikes. In addition, Jakarta was allegedly maneuvering to split the dissidents, specifically the group under South Sumatran commander Barlian. Propaganda to dispel the dissident movement was also alleged to have been in existence in an intelligence memo, as both Indonesia and the Soviet Union were branding the dissidents' movement as a US plot to fragment and enslave the nation.

On February 9, 1958, rebel Colonel Maludin Simbolon issued an ultimatum in the name of a provincial government, the Dewan Banteng or Central Sumatran Revolutionary Council, calling for the formation of a new central government. On February 15 Dewan Banteng became part of a wider Pemerintah Revolusioner Republik Indonesia (PRRI or "Revolutionary Government of the Republic of Indonesia") that included rebels led by other dissident colonels in East and South Sumatra and in North Sulawesi.

Sukarno aggressively opposed the rebels; he called upon his loyal army commander, General Abdul Haris Nasution, to destroy the rebel forces. By February 21 forces loyal to Sukarno had been airlifted to Sumatra and began the attack. The rebel headquarters was in the southern coastal city of Padang. Rebel strongholds stretched all the way to Medan, near the northern end of the island and not far from Malaysia.

On February 21, 1958, the Indonesian military obliterated the radio stations in Sumatra via bombings and established a naval blockade along the coast. Not only did the CIA underestimate the Indonesian Army, but the agency apparently failed to realize that many of the top commanders within the Indonesian Army were fiercely anti-communist, having been trained in the United States, even calling themselves "the sons of Eisenhower." This misstep led to American-aligned Indonesian military forces fighting American-aligned rebel forces. The five CIA officers on Sumatra fled with their lives with the USS Tang, a navy submarine, picking them up. Finally, in a desperate last ditch, CIA pilots began bombing Indonesia's outer islands on April 19, 1958, striking military and civilian targets, killing hundreds of civilians and fomenting much anger among the Indonesian populace. Eisenhower had ordered that no Americans be involved in such missions, yet CIA Director Dulles ignored this order from the president. On May 18, 1958, Al Pope, an American citizen and CIA bomber, was downed over eastern Indonesia, revealing U.S. involvement. The 1958 CIA covert coup thus ended as a complete and transparent failure. The failed coup would become one of the biggest failures in the history of the CIA; the CIA's inability to compete with Soviet covert-intelligence proved costly in this instance and would prove costly in many other CIA operations against the Soviets.

In April and May 1958 CIA proprietary Civil Air Transport (CAT) operated B-26 aircraft from Manado, North Sulawesi to support Permesta rebels. These planes carried people, supplies, and equipment to support the rebels fighting against President Sukarno's government. The CIA wanted to help the rebels without being openly involved, so they used CAT's planes secretly.

Military loyal to the central government of Sukarno launched airborne and seaborne invasions of the rebel strongholds Padang and Manado. By the end of 1958, the rebels were militarily defeated. The last remaining rebel guerilla bands surrendered by August 1961.

In a memorandum dated May 2, 1958, the board of national estimates outlined the position of the Indonesian Communist Party, (PKI). Due to PKI support of Sukarno, the influence of Sukarno's government was significantly influential and powerful. The PKI controlled several pro-government groups, expanded influence in rural areas, and possessed significant military strength. The opposition movement provided a reason for the PKI to strengthen ties and gain influence over Sukarno, thereby bolstering Sukarno's efforts against the opposition, and increasing the schism between Sukarno and western interests.

Fragmentation of non-communist groups also played a role in strengthening Sukarno. Indonesian political groups were very diverse. The non-communist Indonesian political groups were organized according to faith, gender, education, culture, and occupation.

The memorandum from May 2, 1958, points to the weakening of the Masjumi, a non-communist political party, which served as a powerful force to prevent Sukarno from connecting with the PKI. Due to the Masjumi's fragmentation, notes the memo, its former strength or unity was not anticipated to return post-revolution. This highlights the inability of the West to compromise on the West Irian issue and the lack of Western support. The PKI was able to take advantage of this situation because there was no concession from the west. After a revolution, Indonesia would be extremely suspicious of US objectives, which would open up more doors for the PKI and international communist goals.

The failed coup emboldened Sukarno, however, the United Nations backed the formation of Malaysia. By 1965, Sukarno was seen to be decisively siding with communist interests. Despite US air superiority at one stage of the conflict, the Sukarno government stayed in power.

== 1960s ==
According to 1961 internal memo by Jack Lydman, Indonesia was seen as making strong economic progress. Lydman noted that the Indonesian economy was the strongest that it had been in the past three years. He also noted that the Indonesians were economically well-off, and resistant to foreign incursions due to their self-sufficiency. The Indonesians needed to rely on the Soviet and American superpowers very little aside from modern arms. Therefore, Sukarno's continued positive relationship with the Soviet Union caused the CIA to fear the continued delivery of Soviet weapons to the Indonesian government. Despite this, the CIA was happy that Djuanda had gained power of Indonesia's economic situation as the United States felt that he "was the best man we could have in that position."

Nevertheless, despite Indonesia's positive economic situation, CIA intelligence did not believe that this would appease Indonesians that were politically unsatisfied. The CIA believed that, as opposed to other countries throughout the world, Indonesian's relatively consistent economic security meant that their political beliefs were less influenced by their economic conditions. That being said, the CIA was fearful of the PKI's ability to recruit followers in the rural areas of Indonesia.

During late 1961, President Sukarno was determined to invade West New Guinea and argued that it had belonged to Indonesia. Fearful that U.S. opposition would lead to Indonesia reaching out to other Communist governments for support, the U.S. had pushed for the 1962 New York Agreement that was approved by the United Nations that allowed for a brief transitional period for Indonesia to control West New Guinea.

=== Concerns about Indonesia's military build-up ===
In the 1960s, there was rising concerns about Indonesia's military build-up and the possibility of the new nation to build nuclear weapons. The concerns began to unfold in the early 1960s. In November 1962, Lyman B. Kirkpatrick, executive director of the CIA, send a memorandum forwarding the US Air Force Department assessment about the Soviet Union military build-up in Indonesia. The assessment saw parallel on increasing Soviet military presence with the pattern in Cuba. The message warns that there is potential for the Soviet Union to use the Indonesian territory to station its medium-range ballistic missiles (MRBM) or intermediate-range ballistic missiles (IRBM). There were some indicators showing the increasing Soviet military presence in the archipelago as can be seen from the visits of Soviet high-level officials, the presence of Soviet technicians, and the assignment of high military officer (a "maj gen") as an air attache in the Soviet Union embassy Jakarta.

According to a memo released by the CIA on September 29, 1965, the Indonesian government started to develop an increased interest in the acquisition of materials to develop their own nuclear program. During the 1965 International Atomic Energy Association (IAKA) in Tokyo, Japan, an Indonesian official was quoted as saying that Indonesia was actively negotiating nuclear research with China and that by 1970, they would be able to develop their own nuclear reactors. Besides the desire to acquire materials to develop a reactor, Sukarno's administration was directly seeking nuclear weapons from China. Another memo released by the CIA noted that Indonesia had recently withdrawn from the United Nations and had announced that development of a nuclear weapon would be ready by October 1965. The memo also noted that the U.S. had provided a small nuclear reactor (100 kilowatts) to Indonesia in 1964 and that a Russian-made reactor was currently being built (similar in size to the US reactor). In June 1965, the CIA determined that Indonesia was capable of launching surface-to-air missiles from approximately six locations. Later, in December 1965, the CIA outlined that it had been looking for another missile site near Djampang-Kulon. The search was conducted within 25 nautical miles of the area and the site in question was purportedly used for military and experimental purposes. The memo went on to outline that usable photographic coverage of the area in question was largely hindered. Missions that covered the area were limited to a handful of reports; most indicated that photography in the areas was at best fair due to haze and clouds.

During the mid-1960s, communication to what was going on in Indonesia was problematic due to the suspicion that Red China was taking charge. The CIA wasn't part of the uprising of the council of generals and was busy with the Vietnam War at the time. The US government sought to frustrate the PKI's ambitions and influence, as reflected in the CIA's 1965 goals and objectives, and its contemporary Intelligence analyses of the political situation. Agents of the USG, including its embassy and CIA, have stated that there was no direct involvement in the 1965 Indonesian purge of Communists. Scholars have disputed this claim, citing documentary evidence that the US covertly undermined the Sukarno regime and fomented the killings of communists and those branded as communists.

A February 14, 1965, memo outs a CIA agent. William Palmer lived in Puntjak, and was the head of the American Motion Picture Association of Indonesia (AMPAI), which the Jakarta-produced memo describes as a company that had "long brought imperialist films into Indonesia, particularly US imperialist films." The memo describes his "true position" as that of a secret service agent, serving "the US imperialist government." Not only was Palmer fingered as an undercover agent, but the same memo says that the US ambassador in Indonesia, Howard Jones, is actually a CIA agent. The memo alleges collusion between Palmer and Jones, and also says that Palmer hosted Allen Dulles at his home, for a secret meeting. The memo cites as its source a periodical called Mainstream. According to the memo, Mainstream's investigative journalism had discovered evidence that Palmer has been involved in many counterrevolutionary incidents, anti-Sukarno activities, among other "subversive assignments." Mainstream accuses Palmer of providing financial assistance to organizations and parties that can help "form a pro-US cabinet in Indonesia." However, about a week later, Jones denies any American involvement in anti-Sukarno activities or overthrow attempts. The Christian Science Monitor ran a story in 1985, suggesting that the Czech Disinformation Department may have been responsible for the story that Palmer was a CIA agent. The Czechs had established the disinformation through the Indonesian Ambassador, who was receiving girls from them. A former deputy director of Czech disinformation operations, Ladislav Bittman, defected to the West in 1968, and said in his book, The Deception Game, that "the Czechs had no direct and persuasive evidence that Palmer was a CIA employee and could only suspect him to be one." To this day, there is debate as to whether Palmer was, in fact, a CIA agent.

Soeharto's rise to power started in his response to the 30 September Movement of 1965. Various theories are present in academia detailing the inspiration for the 30 September Movement, however the CIA stated that it was a leftist plot. In a memo on political forces in Indonesia, the CIA asserted that the army was upset with Sukarno's leftist tendencies and were looking to force Sukarno out of power or incentivize the PKI, the communist party, to attack the state. The 30 September Movement was a failure that resulted in the death of six top army generals. Tensions erupted after the attempted purge of communists by the Indo Army. The September 30th Movement accounted for the kidnapping and murder of six high ranking Indo Army generals. As a result, the Indonesian Army and its paramilitary allies launched a campaign. The plan was total annihilation against the PKI and its allies. This event would ultimately cause up to 500,000 PKI supporters to be killed between October 1965 and March 1966. Soeharto's ascension to leadership marked a turning point in Indonesian politics, leading to a significant shift away from Sukarno's leftist policies. Soeharto's crackdown on communists and his consolidation of power within the military reshaped Indonesia's political landscape. (46)

Due to there being no practice the generals were killed brutally. Following the failed mission and assassination of the generals, Soeharto then seized the opportunity to take control of the armed forces. He used the event to sanction a crackdown on communists who were deemed to be behind the coup plot. Major General Soeharto was appointed by President Sukarno. He was chosen to replace General Yani (who was assassinated). Numerous army generals believed that Sukarno approved the 30 September Movement coup so that there would not be any opposition to communism. Political tensions loomed thick during this time between Sukarno (who seemed to be siding with communism) and Soeharto (who took down anyone and everyone involved with the communist party).

In August, the Under Secretary of State requested a Special National Intelligence Estimate (SNIE) on communism in Indonesia. The July NIE about Indonesia's political conditions was insightful, but the Under Secretary specifically wanted more information about communism and how a communist government would impact Indonesia and any surrounding or associating countries, especially in the Far East. This request was sent to DCI William F Raborn, for the SNIE to be prepared and submitted in September.

In November 1965, another coup was attempted but also proved unsuccessful. According to the president's Daily Briefs, Sukarno wanted to send a message to both military officials and the press. First, he wanted to make it clear that Indonesia was in alliance with the Communist axis which included North Vietnam, China, and Cambodia, and that their allegiance was against "American imperialism." Also, he wanted to make it known that he found the media at the time to be slanderous to their regime, their party, and other communist governments. He minimized the effect of the coup and voiced further intent of resistance to the American forces. In the same year, the left-leaning government of Sukarno was overthrown in a military coup by General Soeharto. The new military quickly went after everybody who was opposed to the new regime. Non-violent communist supporters, Indonesian women's movements, trade union movement organizers and activists, intellectuals, teachers, land reform advocates, and the ethnic Chinese were all targeted. Over the course of about two years, it is estimated now by survivors, that as many as 2,500,000 of these people were massacred.

As of 1967, the Soviet-Indonesian relationship was strained because of the last coup attempt. The USSR decided to suspend its economic and military aid to Indonesia. Indonesia in August 1967 joined Malaysia, Singapore, the Philippines, and Thailand to form the Association of Southeast Asian Nations (ASEAN). This further strained the Indonesian- Soviet relationship.

In 1968, a consular officer and his wife were approved to visit Indonesia and report back to the Department of State over the current conditions. In the declassified summary report, it was found that while things had improved economically, "..the economy is stagnant and, with the exceptions of new United Nations projects and some interest shown by Japanese and American businessmen, no effort is being made to improve the situation." It also reflects the opinion of many westerners who believed Indonesia could not win open elections and how within the separatist movements, they were not able to accept a union "without a struggle."

=== Fight against the Indonesian Communist Party ===
General Soeharto was directly appointed by President Sukarno to lead the Indonesian army. From the very beginning of his rule he planned to destroy and disrupt the Communist Party in Indonesia. Even communist sympathizers were not safe—he planned to make examples of them as well. Indeed, he had given orders to wipe out every Communist in Indonesia. Every commander in the military was ordered to "clean up everything." ("I ordered all of my people to send patrols out and capture everybody in the PKI post.") Those that were captured were then given options to "surrender, support the government, or die."

The oppression was not just physical. Propaganda campaigns were conducted against the PKI while they were being exterminated. After the 30 September movement coup failed, the army set up a new tabloid to spread rumors of the bestiality of the PKI. They emphasized that women would sink to new depths of depravity under the influence of the godless communists.

One of the first regions to feel the wrath of General Soeharto's campaign against communism was the district of Prambanan. In this area, Soeharto's soldiers went on hunts for suspected communists. They would ask peasants if they were members of the PKI and the soldiers' slightest suspicion led to death or capture. One example account of this concerns a peasant's buying cheaper seed from a PKI member. In return, the member mislead the peasant and signed him up for the PKI, causing him to get killed. The peasant knew nothing about the PKI or Communist Party; he was just taking advantage of a good deal. Thousands of people were rounded up and held until a decision was made about their fate. In the harshest case, prisoners were interrogated about Communism. If they were believed to be communists, they were taken to a killing location, shot in the back of the head, tossed into a prepared hole, and then left to rot.

The Indonesian military was slaughtering communists, but it was presented to the western press as a civil war so as not to elicit sympathy for the communists.

According to documentation declassified in the late 90s and released in 2001 pertaining to the Indonesian Army's fight against the Indonesian Communist Party, the U.S. Embassy originally stated that 50–100 PKI members were being killed nightly. In an air-gram to Washington in April 1966, the estimated fatalities had reached between 100,000 and 1,000,000.

The fight against the Indonesian Communist Party eventually led to President Soeharto's heightening of power and ultimately led to a brutal dictatorship from 1967 to 1998, marking 31 years of brutality.

The United States' involvement in these activities is marked with controversy. An August 1966 air gram from Marshall Green stated that the U.S. Embassy had prepared a list of communist leaders with attribution to the Embassy removed, and that the list was being used by Indonesian security officials that lacked overt knowledge on communist officials.

=== US stance in 1965 ===
The government of the United States continued to view the military opportunistically, understanding that it had a strong anti-Communist stance. In one 12-page report, an analyst noted that the military loathed the PKI and regarded "Communism as an ideology which is essentially evil, totalitarian, and alien to the 'Indonesian way of life.'"

In 1965, after the "30th of September Slaughter", the American and British governments were increasingly interested in conducting another joint operation. On October 5, 1965, British diplomat Sir Andrew Gilchrist wrote that, "I have never concealed... my belief that a little shooting in Indonesia would be an essential preliminary to effective change". This was used as an incentive to provoke quick action against the PKI. American officials backed this sentiment, with one writing that "We are, as always, sympathetic to [the Indonesian] army's desires to eliminate communist influence". With Western governments supporting anti-PKI Indonesian military generals, mass killings of PKI supporters and members began. By the beginning of November several hundred had been executed. On November 25, 1965, British intelligence reported that, "PKI men and women are being executed in very large numbers. Some victims are given a knife and invited to kill themselves. Most refuse and are told to turn around and are shot in the back". An Indonesian executioner was quoted as considering the killings a "duty to exterminate" what he called "less than animals". The American consulate in Medan reported that "Something like a reign of terror against PKI is taking place".

=== Unanticipated event ===
An action proposal was approved in March of that year, with an intermediate intelligence memorandum in July, and a SNIE (Special National Intelligence Estimate), on the situation regarding Indonesia and Malaysia, in September. According to H. W. Brands, American officials were so unprepared for the crisis that at first they misidentified the anti-communist leader, General Suharto.

On October 1, 1965 (late night of September 30), early in the morning, six senior Indonesian army generals were kidnapped and executed by a group who called themselves the "30 September Movement". The so-called "movement" was headed by Lt. Colonel Untung, an officer in the President's bodyguard. According to a declassified CIA memo from October 6, 1965, the movement also included parts of the Indonesian army and air force, as well as members of several Communist organizations. On the same morning in October, a radio message was transmitted claiming that operation was "supported by troops of other branches of the armed forces" and that Utung acted to prevent a supposed 'generals' coup. These radio messages also insisted that the attempted coup was "American-inspired", while ensuring that the President and any other possible targets were now "under the protection of the movement." They proceeded to establish a left-wing "Revolutionary Council" which was composed of government officials who were not opposed to Communism, as well as members of various Communist parties.

Sukarto would be marked safe as he was at one of his wives homes with only one of his bodyguards who happened to be the only person to know where he was a part from his wife who was still at a party. When news arrived of the attacks, the president was relocated to a safer place to ensure he was not caught in the events. He would later find out about what had transpired and made it be known that this was a political action and should be handled politically. Soeharta implied that the Air Force and the communist party were complicit in the murder of the generals and their comrades and that the well used to throw the bodies into and then open heavy fire were on Air Force training grounds. There were still questions of Sukarno's involvement and knowledge of the coup and whether he was at his wife's home that night to be near a plane or because of his illness.

The self-appointed government did not muster support, and a few days later Sukarno regained control, but insisted that this was a political issue and refused to impose harsh penalties on those involved in the "30 September Movement". The memo notes the involvement of the PKI in the movement, and their subsequent disappearance from the public eye. It also speculates on the possible involvement of Sukarno in the operation. This document illustrates the agency's ability to see past what appears to be happening, and instead looks at the primary consequences and who benefited from what transpired. The CIA believed that the movement was a type of false flag operation that attempted to garner support for Sukarno, pro-Communist sentiment, and anti-American sentiment. Sukarno, with the apparent support of the army, began to align himself with Communist policies. The memo advises that the army does not support the Communist policies. However, Sukarno's declaration that the problem is political, and therefore requires a political solution, has stalled any possibility of the army taking action against the PKI. It predicts Sukarno's goals of returning the Communist Party to the "favorable political position it enjoyed prior to the events of October 1." Some people believed that Sukarno was speaking under duress and that he might have been forced to make these statements, which would indicate that he did not actually believe that the PKI should be handled politically. The CIA then started to question whether or not Soeharto would listen to Sukarno's statements and leave them alone or not.

The immediate aftermath of this event brought swift changes. The army could not simply take control of the government because they needed Sukarno's name attached to them in order to gain legitimacy. Sukarno, on the other hand, needed to strengthen the PKI after this massacre because they formed a strong base of support. Despite this, both the army and Sukarno were essentially two distinct governments within Indonesia. Sukarno did, however, appoint General Soeharto as the head of the military at the behest of other military leaders. Sukarno wanted someone who would be softer on the PKI, but still chose Soeharto nonetheless due to strong army pressure. Within a month of the September 30 massacre, the army had arrested as many as 2,000 PKI party members or suspected members. A further 74 had been executed. By this point, the CIA knew that the military and Sukarno were moving in different directions. Sukarno wanted to revive the PKI, while the military was trying to eliminate any communist support.

In October 1965 a German Embassy officer received information that the Indo Army were considering to quickly overthrow Sukarno. The Indo Army hoped for Western sympathy in the event they did decide to depose Sukarno.

Many anti-PKI groups began demonstrating, trying to remove the party from any politics. Sukarno attempted to rein in the army, but they continued to pursue their own goal of eliminating the PKI, believing that Sukarno himself may have played a role in the attempted coup. Because of this, the CIA concluded that communism in Indonesia would be on the defense and that Sukarno's power was weakening. A situations report from November 1965 also showed increasingly anti-Chinese sentiment in the region, stating that Chinese nationals were being victimized in the country, including a Chinese embassy office in Jakarta being entered by armed troops. The report also indicates that there was anti-Communist and PKI sentiment throughout the general population during the time period, mentioning one of many protests that took place calling for the banning of the PKI in the country. U.S. Ambassador Marshall similarly mentioned that 90% of Chinese owned shops were raided in Makassar due to two factors, the discovering of PKI weapons and unwillingness of the shops to lower prices.

The CIA closely monitored Soeharto's relationship with the PKI. They kept especially close tabs on meetings he held with other members of the government. One report notes "a possible decision to ban the PKI," which is something the CIA had expressed interest in, in all of its reports. However, although Sukarno stated that he would consider banning the PKI, he said the bans would not be limited to them. A report outlining a speech Sukarno gave on November 6 states that Sukarno said, "I am urged to ban the PKI. I am considering this. But I will ban the PNI, Partindo, PSII, NU and any other party which does not help to create a calm atmosphere. I will ban all parties, not just the PKI."

But Soeharto had his own agenda when taking his new position as the head of the Indonesian army: to prosecute and kill PKI members and supporters, as reflected in his motto "surrender, support the government or die." Shortly after being appointed as head of the army, Soeharto set in motion a plan for a complete takeover of the government. Eventually, with the help of the U.S. government and the army, Soeharto defeated Sukarno and took over the government. A briefing meant for the DCI dated in October 1965 states quite contrarily to what was proven that during the aftermath of the 1965 coup, both governments declared in the region were interdependent on each other; this obviously was proved untrue. The U.S. ambassador to Indonesia publicly denied any CIA involvement, saying that no agency had ever attempted to overthrow Sukarno.

=== Anti-communist purge ===
Bradley Simpson, Director of the Indonesia/East Timor Documentation Project at the National Security Archive, contends that declassified documents indicate that the United States "provided economic, technical and military aid to the army soon after the killings started. It continued to do so long after it was clear a 'widespread slaughter' was taking place in Northern Sumatra and other places, and in the expectation that US assistance would contribute to this end." Further evidence for this funding has been substantiated by a cable that was sent from Ambassador Marshall Green, after meeting with CIA's Hugh Tovar, to the assistant secretary of state Bill Bundy, one advocating for payments to be sent to anti-communist fighter Adam Malik:

This is to confirm my earlier concurrence that we provide Malik with fifty million rupiah [about $10,000] for the activities of the Kap-Gestapu movement. The army-inspired but civilian-staffed group is still carrying burden of current repressive efforts...Our willingness to assist him in this manner will, I think, represent in Malik's mind our endorsement of his present role in the army's anti-PKI efforts, and will promote good cooperating relations between him and the army. The chances of detection or subsequent revelation of our support in this instance are as minimal as any black flag operation can be.

Other cables from Green, issued to the State Department, suggested that the United States played a role in developing elements of the anti-communist propaganda following alleged PKI activities. As Green stated in a cable dated from October 5, 1965, "We can help shape developments to our advantage...spread the story of PKIs guilt, treachery, and brutality." He went on to say that it would be a welcome goal to blacken the eye of the PKI in the eyes of the people. This position of ousting the communist PKI was later echoed by the CIA's Hugh Tovar, who recalled with great satisfaction how the PKI were partially defeated due to the use of Soviet-provided weapons.

Though Soviet weapons were used to kill members of the PKI, the United States was complicit in providing money and backing to the anti-PKI leaders, General Suharto and Adam Malik. Malik, as reported by CIA's Clyde McAvoy, was trained, housed, and supplied by the CIA. "I recruited and ran Adam Malik," McAvoy said in a 2005 interview. "He was the highest-ranking Indonesian we ever recruited." The conflict in Indonesia ultimately led to the killing of at least 500,000 people, a number confirmed by Ambassador Green in a 1967 Senate Foreign Relations Committee hearing.

In May 1990, the States News Service published a study by journalist Kathy Kadane which highlighted significant U.S. involvement in the killings. Kadane quoted Robert J. Martens (who worked for the U.S. embassy) as saying that senior U.S. diplomats and CIA officials provided a list of approximately 5,000 names of Communist operatives to the Indonesian Army while it was hunting down and killing members the Communist Party of Indonesia (PKI) and alleged sympathisers. Martens told Kadane that "It really was a big help to the army. They probably killed a lot of people, and I probably have a lot of blood on my hands, but that's not all bad. There's a time when you have to strike hard at a decisive moment." Kadane wrote that approval for the release of names put on the lists came from top U.S. embassy officials; Ambassador Marshall Green, deputy chief of mission Jack Lydman and political section chief Edward Masters. The accuracy of Kadane's report was challenged by those officials in a July 1990 article in The New York Times. Martens asserted that he alone compiled the list from the Indonesian communist press, that the names were "available to everyone," and that "no one, absolutely no one, helped me compile the lists in question." He admitted to providing the list of "a few thousand" names of PKI leaders and senior cadre (but not the party rank and file) to Indonesian "non-Communist forces" during the "six months of chaos," but denied any CIA or embassy involvement.

Green called Kadane's account "garbage," adding that "there are instances in the history of our country....where our hands are not as clean, and where we have been involved....But in this case we certainly were not". Lydman, Masters, and two other CIA officers quoted by Kadane also denied that her account had any validity. Masters stated:

I certainly would not disagree with the fact that we had these lists, that we were using them to check off, O.K., what was happening to the party. But the thing that is giving me trouble, and that is absolutely not correct, is that we gave these lists to the Indonesians and that they went out and picked up and killed them. I don't believe it. And I was in a position to know.

The States News Service issued a memo in July 1990 defending the accuracy of Kadane's work, and in a rebuttal to their statements to The New York Times, published excerpts from the interviews that Kadane had made with Green, Lydman and Masters. In 2001, the National Security Archive reported that Ambassador Marshall Green admitted in an August 1966 airgram to Washington, which was drafted by Martens and approved by Masters, that the lists were "apparently being used by Indonesian security authorities who seem to lack even the simplest overt information on PKI leadership." In an October 1965 telegram, Green endorsed the Indonesian military "destroying PKI" through executions. In February 1966, he further expressed approval that "the Communists . . . have been decimated by wholesale massacre." Historian Geoffrey B. Robinson asserts that such U.S. government officials "published memoirs and articles that sought to divert attention from any possible US role, while questioning the integrity and political loyalties of scholars who disagreed with them." Robinson also posits that the mass killings would not have happened absent the support of the U.S. and other powerful Western governments.

Scholars, including documentary filmmaker Joshua Oppenheimer, the director of The Act of Killing and The Look of Silence, have since then corroborated Kadane's account of U.S. involvement in the killings. In a January 2014 interview with The Diplomat, Oppenheimer stated:

The details of what individual Western governments did are somewhat obscure, but for example the United States provided cash for the death squad and the army, weapons, radios so the army could coordinate the killing campaigns across the 17,000-island archipelago, and death lists. I interviewed two retired CIA agents and a retired state department official whose job was to compile lists generally of public figures known publicly to the army, compiled lists of thousands of names of people the U.S. wanted killed, and hand these names over to the army and then check off which ones had been killed. They would get the list back with the names ticked off [designating] who had been captured and killed.

Regarding the 5,000 individuals named on the lists, Oppenheimer contends "my understanding is that 100% were killed." Robinson also asserts that "despite Marten's later denials of any such intent, these actions almost certainly aided in the death or detention of many innocent people," and that providing the lists "sent a powerful message that the US government agreed with and supported the army's campaign against the PKI, even as that campaign took its terrible toll in human lives."

Writing in his 2020 book The Jakarta Method, Vincent Bevins says that this was not the first instance of US officials providing kill lists of suspected communists to members of foreign regimes, as they had done so in Guatemala in 1954 and Iraq in 1963. Bevins also notes that it was not a practice of US government officials alone, as managers of US-owned plantations also provided the Indonesian army with lists of "troublesome" communists and union organizers who were subsequently rounded up and murdered.

On December 10, 2014, Senator Tom Udall (D-NM) introduced a "Sense of the Senate Resolution," which condemned the killings and called for the declassification of all documents pertaining to U.S. involvement in the events, noting that "the U.S. provided financial and military assistance during this time and later, according to documents released by the State Department."

In 2016, Indonesia's human rights commission submitted an official request to the U.S. government to declassify archived files believed to detail the CIA's involvement in the killings. A tribunal on the mass killings held in The Hague concluded the killings constitute crimes against humanity, and that the United States and other Western governments were complicit in the crimes.

On October 17, 2017, declassified documents from the US embassy in Jakarta covering 1963–1966 revealed that not only did the US government have detailed knowledge of the killings as they happened (and welcomed them), but also had actively encouraged and facilitated the massacres to further their geopolitical interests in the region. A November 1965 report by the aforementioned political affairs officer, Edward E Masters, examined the spread of large scale executions to multiple provinces and the role of youth groups in helping resolve the "main problem" of housing and feeding PKI prisoners. He stated that "many provinces appear to be successfully meeting this problem by executing their PKI prisoners, or killing them before they are captured, a task in which Moslem youth groups are providing assistance." Historian Bradley R. Simpson says the documents "contain damning details that the US was willfully and gleefully pushing for the mass murder of innocent people." Historian John Roosa contends the documents show "the U.S. was part and parcel of the operation, strategizing with the Indonesian army and encouraging them to go after the PKI."

== 1970s ==
On 7 December 1975 Indonesia invaded East Timor which recently gained independence from Portugal. See the following article on Indonesia's Indonesia's invasion of East Timor. The Indonesian government wanted East Timor to be integrated into the Indonesian state. However, in gaining independence the people of East Timor would have self-determination, including remaining an independent country with its own democratically elected government. In a 5 July 1975 meeting at Camp David between Soeharto and U.S. President Gerald Ford, Soeharto claimed the independence movement was "almost Communist". Soeharto also claimed the majority of voters in East Timor wanted to unify with Indonesia. The day before the invasion was launched, President Ford and Henry Kissinger expressed tacit support for the invasion during a face-to-face meeting with Soeharto in Jakarta.

Recently de-classified documents explain the ways in which the US government played a key role in the Indonesian takeover of East Timor from 1975 to 1999. General Soeharto believed he had the United States' blessing for the invasion during a state visit from Henry Kissinger and Gerald Ford. The National Security Archive posted on the internet the results and reports from the 2006 Commission for Reception, Truth, and Reconciliation (CAVR), regarding the reality of the East Timor invasion. The Commission gathered sources, documents, and information about the invasion and the role that different powers played, "...estimates that up to 180,000 East Timorese were killed by Indonesian troops or died of enforced starvation and other causes resulting from the occupation between 1975 and 1999. The 'Responsibility' chapter details the primary role of the Indonesian military and security forces, as well as the supporting roles played by Australia, Portugal, the United States, the United Nations, the United Kingdom, and France."

The anti-communist regime of Indonesia was good for the United States. The US turned a blind eye to the Indonesian invasion of East Timor, as they understood that the anti-communists of Indonesia could benefit the US and the spreading communism within Southeast Asia. In a recently de-classified document from the Department of State, President Ford, and Secretary of State, Henry Kissinger, met with President Soeharto in Indonesia in 1975. They discussed the relationship between the two countries and the current situation with Vietnam and China. During this meeting, Kissinger and Ford gave their consent to allow Indonesia to continue the invasion of East Timor.

The Commission found that the US supplied the Indonesian army with weaponry and aircraft charters which allowed the Indonesians to take over and kill thousands of East Timorese people. These people were starved by the Indonesian and the US ignored the cause of these deaths, claiming that they were dying because of a draught, in reality, they were being intentionally starved by the use of Indonesian policies and force.

The CIA's role in the East Timor invasion appears to be limited to intelligence gathering. A 1999 article from The Guardian states, “MI6 and the CIA knew almost everything the Indonesians were planning” regarding the East Timor invasion.

== President Sukarno ==
=== President Sukarno's health ===
Among the events being documented by the CIA were reports of President Sukarno's health conditions. In a meeting related to issues of foreign relations in New York in December 1964, the U.S. secretary started the meeting off by inquiring about President Sukarno's health. Deputy PriMin Subandrio responded that "...an X-ray taken in Vienna some months ago had revealed there was a stone in President Sukarno's right kidney. Inasmuch as his other kidney is already affected...the X-ray had given rise to real concern. Subsequent examination, however, had shown that the second kidney stone was not serious."

Although President Sukarno's health condition was not a concern at that meeting, a later report discloses that his health condition had become serious. A report to the U.S. president included the health conditions of President Sukarno: "Sukarno collapsed three days ago and was still in bed yesterday. Despite Sukarno's long-standing kidney ailment, for which he delays proper treatment, he has seemed quite chipper lately...a team of Chinese Communist doctors has been scheduled to visit Jakarta and there is some suspicion that another acupuncture treatment may involved...although Sukarno may only have the flu, background political maneuvering may already have begun against the possibility it is more serious."

Sukarno's declining health emboldened Soeharto, who had been residing in the United States, to return to Indonesia. To that point, Soeharto was only an obscure military figure in the cloud of information that surrounded Indonesia in the 1960s. Soeharto was eventually able to come to power, and was officially named the President of Indonesia on February 22, 1967.

=== President Sukarno and the CIA ===
The CIA believed Sukarno to be a popular, capable leader, despite his dismissal and lack of understanding of economic issues in the country, and the CIA believed this to be an area ripe for communist exploitation. That being true, a special report from October 1964 indicates that the CIA believed Sukarno was at the very least indirectly involved with the Indonesian Communist Party (PKI). This report accused the Indonesian president of leaving the PKI unchallenged in order to protect his own interests and power, referring back to his Sukarno also made a state visit to the Soviet Union in the late 1950s. This visit sent up a "red flag" to the U.S.. It's fears of Indonesia embracing the Soviets were later somewhat realized when Indonesia received agriculture loans and limited Soviet arms. August 17, 1964 speech for the country's Independence Day, wherein Sukarno made pro-communist statements. The report then states that the PKI quickly aligned itself to the speech, indicating that both the PKI and President Sukarno benefited from the successes of the other. This CIA document expresses concern that Sukarno supports both Communist and anti-American ideals, wishing to remove Western influences from the region. Although this report did not give any recommendation for how the CIA or the US should proceed in their relationship with Sukarno, it did warn that "if he [lived] a few more years, it [was] likely that he [would] eventually preside over a modified Communist regime."

Although he had just returned from a diplomatic trip to the United States where he left positive impressions, in May 1965 President Sukarno openly expressed his concerns over the imbalance of power that had developed in Indonesia. To combat the improper balance, Sukarno implemented steps to balance political power in Indonesia more evenly.

1. During the first week of May, Sukarno signed a decree reinstating Murba as a recognized and sanctioned political party within the country.
2. May 5, General Nasution was sent to Moscow to deliver an invitation to Soviet Premier Kosygin to visit Indonesia. It was also Nasution's mission to pacify the Russians by assuring them that Sukarno intended to take certain measures which would alter the current situation.
3. Sukarno called for a major cabinet reshuffle. This move would be made to balance the internal forces of power in his favor.

The United States received a message from the Indonesian government that stated plans to sever diplomatic relations by August 1965. "The Indonesian communist party which was rapidly increasing in strength was pressuring President Sukarno to break away from U.S. relations and support". Confrontation inspired the Indonesian campaign further to completely remove Western influence from Southeast Asia. This pursuit drew Indonesia into an informal alliance with communist China. Military schools were injected with communist doctrine under the control of the Indonesian Communist Party (PKI).

During the meeting with the UN, Sukarno and his ministers explained their concerns about the Dutch "using British Occupation as a cover to achieve a coup d'tat." This was due to Dutch troops that were starting to arrive in Java in incredibly small numbers. Many of these assaults the nationalists said were "made from trucks that had markings 'USA' on them and many of the Dutch soldiers were dressed in U.S. uniforms."

Sukarno struck up a revolution with the attempt at a coup supported by the PKI. Blame and reminders were brought out against the CIA by the Indonesian government to remind the people and were marked as a threat to Indonesian sovereignty. The CIA recruited Malik to drive a "political wedge between the left and the right in Indonesia". The CIA worked to build a shadow government to use in a clandestine setting to fight back against Sukarno and the PKI. It was the goal of the CIA to rid the country of communism through a new political movement. Soeharto and Kap Gestapu were given American support but in secrecy. $500,000 U.S. dollars was given to support the Indonesian army, Soeharto, and Gestapu through the CIA. The CIA had a rumor that their slogan was "Sukarnoism to kill Sukarnoism and Sukarno." The CIA denied involvement with Indonesia. The CIA also denied support of the anti-communist group that was called "Body for the promotion of Sukarnoism." On September 29 of 1965, Sukarno was trying to detonate an atomic bomb on Indonesian territory. He was trying to get Communist China to help him achieve this goal. The detonation was expected to happen in November. According to the International atomic energy association conference Indonesia was trying to come to an agreement with Communist China to research the atomic bomb. Indonesia was expected to build their own reactors by 1970 and the country would gain access to large amounts of uranium and thorium. Peking was not expected to agree to help even though they have a mutual interest. Peking did not trust Sukarno. The Chinese were not sure about the success of a Communist takeover following the death of Sukarno so they do not want to give information about nuclear technology to non-communist regime.

President Sukarno had been collaborating during the war. A political stance the republican ministers attributed to be willing to work with any country that would pledge to support the Indonesian independence. Even though the Japanese promises were lies, Sukarno acknowledged the gratitude for the recent occupation. The Japanese unintentionally or intentionally helped to unify the Indonesian people and provided military training for the armed forces. Many of the nationalists believed "capable of resorting to force if necessary in order to preserve their independence.

Sukarno was placed under house arrest due to the possible involvement he played in the coup attempt. He died as a broken man in the year of 1970. President Sukarno had at least six assassination attempts on his life in which he blamed the CIA for the majority of these assassination attempts.

Sukarno was a nationalist and was never a communist. Despite this fact, he was forced to be dependent on the communist party because it was able to help him mobilize mass support for his political objectives. The West and many other countries then began to have fears of the danger of communism in Indonesia, which is why the CIA and other Western organizations plotted his overthrow. A secret 1966 CIA memo reveals that the CIA was particularly interested in American business interests in Indonesia, especially after Sukarno's attempts to nationalize key industries. The report notes that in April and May of 1966, the Soeharto government "signed agreements with U.S. Rubber and Goodyear, providing for the payment of $4.1 million to U.S. Rubber and $4.5 million to Goodyear over a period of seven years." In its report, the CIA also mentions the U.S. oil firms Caltex and Stanvac. noting that "Caltex operations...have continued to be profitable," while Stanvac aimed to be sold to the Indonesians for $27.5 million, "even if Permina, the government-owned oil company conducting the negotiations, is abolished." A later report, dating from 1970, confirms that American business interests benefitted greatly from the Soeharto regime, stating that "in the case of crude petroleum, substantial benefits have begun to be obtained...Output reached 750,000 barrels per day in 1969 -- about 50% higher than in 1967 -- and investment in the industry is now amounting to $100 million annually." The memorandum reveals that "agreements with some 30 foreign companies to explore the country's oil resources have already been reached and expectations are high that important new oilfields will be found," while also noting that increased petroleum production had "little impact" on the Indonesian economy itself.

== Discussion of assassinating Sukarno ==
In 1975, the Rockefeller Commission looked into claims that the CIA had been involved in assassination attempts on foreign leaders, part of the so-called Family Jewels which detailed the illegal, inappropriate or embarrassing activities of the CIA. The Ford administration attempted (but failed) to keep the Rockefeller Commission from investigating reports of CIA planning for assassinations abroad. Unsuccessful in blocking investigation into the assassinations, Richard Cheney, then the deputy assistant to the president, excised the 86 page section of the commission's report dealing with assassination and those pages were not made available to the public on White House orders. The bulk of the 86-pages focuses on U.S. covert activities against Cuba including some assassination plots against Fidel Castro. A smaller section of the report also investigates CIA actions against the president of the Dominican Republic, Rafael Trujillo. Although the report briefly mentions plans against Congolese President Patrice Lumumba and Indonesia's President Sukarno. To quote the Commission report's findings on assassination Sukarno:

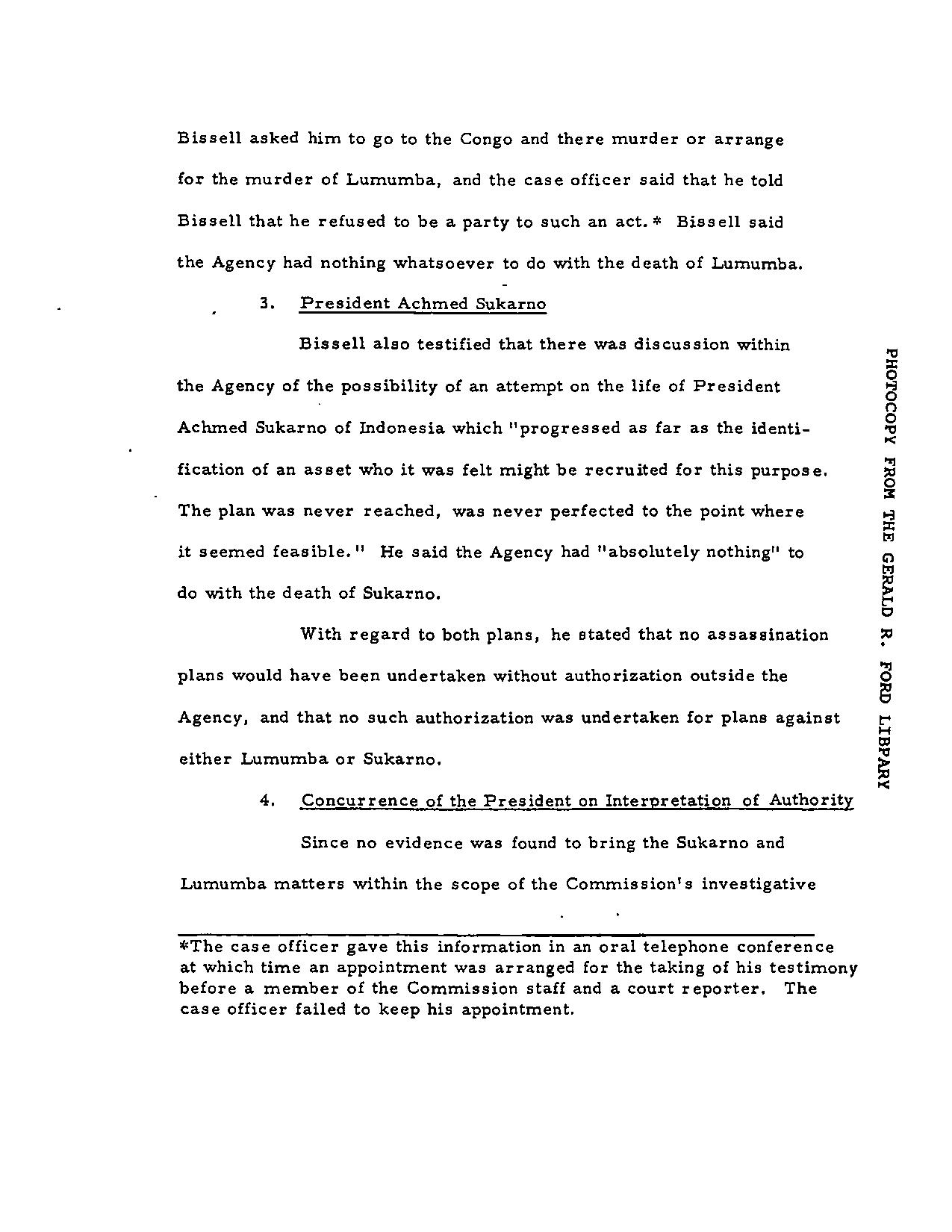

Bissell also testified that there was discussion within the Agency of the possibility of an attempt on the life of President Achmed Sukarno of Indonesia which "progressed as far as the identification of an asset who it was felt might be recruited for the purpose. The plan was never reached, was never perfected to the point where it seemed feasible." He said the Agency had "absolutely nothing" to do with the death of Sukarno. With regard to both plans, he stated that no assassination plans would have been undertaken without authorization outside the Agency, and that no such authorization was undertaken for plans against either Lumumba or Sukarno.

== 1980s ==
In 1986, a CIA report described the build up of chemical weapons in Indonesia and, more broadly, Asia. The document states that "with the worldwide spread of [chemical and biological weapon] CBW capabilities, many countries are expressing interest in acquiring protective and retaliatory capabilities". The report details the expansion of Indonesian chemical weapon (CW) research in response to use of CWs in Laos and Cambodia and the "acquisition of chemical capabilities by neighboring states". The author of the document indicates that the US should expect Indonesia to continue to build its CW capabilities, but the US should not view Indonesia as a threat.

== Secrets as of 1998 ==
DCI George Tenet, in declining the declassification of nine operations, said it would constitute a secret history of American power as used against foreign governments by three Presidents. Such CIA operations regarding Indonesia included political propaganda and bombing missions by aircraft during the 1950s.

In 2001, the CIA attempted to prevent the publication of the State Department volume Foreign Relations of the United States, 1964–1968, which documents U.S. involvement in the Indonesian mass killings of leftists in the 1960s. A four-page memo written by the then active Far East Division Chief, William E. Colby, had its text erased. This memo was dated only one day after the U.S. planned to move tens of thousands of dollars to an anti-Indonesian Communist Party in the 1960s. The document had stated that there was almost no chance that the support of U.S. intelligence would be released. It was estimated that between 100,000 and 1,000,000 "Communists" were killed, including little children and Chinese Indonesians; however, the actual number is unknown.

A retrospective historical report published by the CIA in 1996 admits that "Sukarno was no 'dube of the Communists.' Chinese or any other, and confirms that the PKI had "virtually no ethnic Chinese on its personnel roster. Not more than a dozen Chinese names could be found among some 2,000 PKI biographic information cards at the American embassy." The report continues, stating that "the average PKI member often shared the same ingrained suspicion and animosity toward the Chinese as his non-Communist countrymen." concluding that "while the PKI made the fraternal and adulatory noises toward Peking and the Chinese revolution...It is out of the Question for Sukarno or Aidit to have offered any outside power 'a piece of the action' or requested help in the September 30 affair."

== Independence Referendum 1999 ==
In 1999, the people of East Timor voted to become an independent nation while under occupation from the Indonesian military. In the leadup to the referendum, the Indonesian government began arming and mobilizing paramilitary groups as part of a "scorched earth campaign" to suppress independence-seeking groups that resulted in the death of over 1,500 Timorese peoples, more than 250,000 forcibly driven across the border into West Timor, and approximately 80% of the country's infrastructure being destroyed. Documents declassified by the NSA revealed that the United States government was aware of these campaigns but that the Clinton Administration had determined that keeping positive relations with the Indonesian military establishment was a priority despite opposition from Congress, human rights groups, and United States embassy personnel. Declassified documents revealed human rights abuses that occurred in Indonesia dating as far back as the 1960s, of which the United States was also aware.

East Timor overwhelmingly voted for independence in 1999. This prompted the Indonesian military and its militia proxies to launch a "scorched earth campaign" that resulted in the death of over 1,500 Timorese peoples, more than 250,000 forcibly driven across the border into West Timor, and approximately 80% of the country's infrastructure being destroyed. The CIA noted in a 1999 Terrorism review that the Indonesian military "aided or worked with prointegration militias" and 6 September "worked openly with the militia to force people out of East Timor".

== See also ==
- Indonesian mass killings of 1965–66
- Foreign interventions by the United States
- United States involvement in regime change
