= If We Burn =

2023 book by Vincent Bevins

- Author: Vincent Bevins
- Language: English
- Publisher: Hachette Book Group
- Publication date: 3 October 2023
- Pages: 337
- ISBN: 978-1-5417-8897-8

If We Burn: The Mass Protest Decade and the Missing Revolution is a 2023 political history and journalism book by author and journalist Vincent Bevins. The book concerns the wave of mass protests during the 2010s and examines the question of how the organization and tactics of such protests resulted in a "missing revolution", given that most of these movements appear to have failed in their goals, and even led to a "record of failures, setbacks, and cataclysms". The title refers to the theme of self-immolation, which appears at the beginning and end of the decade, from the tragic death of Mohamed Bouazizi in 2011 to the adoption of a phrase from The Hunger Games during the 2019–2020 Hong Kong protests: "If we burn, you burn with us."

The book begins by tracing the history of left wing activism from the end of the October Revolution, through the New Left and into the present day. In particular, it traces the history of vanguardism in left-wing movement politics and the shift toward distributed horizontalism in mass protest movements since the early 20th century. The final chapter argues that the lack of central leadership enabled media misrepresentation of interests within horizontal movements, which subsequently defused and dissipated the energy and efficacy of the movements. The book additionally argues that the lack of leadership structure also allowed right-wing groups to co-opt social movements for their own purposes, leading in part to a full reversal of momentum as in Brazil.

The book draws on four years of research and hundreds of interviews, including with many of the original organizers of major protest movements. Bevins starts from a position of sympathy for the movements he describes, despite their varied ideological content. Author Naomi Klein notes that the work is carried out in the spirit of self-criticism or autocritique. Bevins is very critical of the mainstream media he is a part of, and uses his own experience to point to the ways that his class misrepresented or re-configured protest explosions.

Movements included in the book, inter alia:

- Movimento Passe Livre, in Brazil
- Arab Spring, particularly in Tunisia and Egypt
- Occupy Wall Street, in the United States
- 2014 Hong Kong protests
- Euromaidan, in Ukraine
- 2019–2022 Chilean protests
- 2016–2017 South Korean protests

== Reception ==
The book has been praised by authors and academics such as Greg Grandin, Laleh Khalili, and Rosana Pinheiro-Machado, and was positively reviewed in publications such as The New Yorker, Publishers Weekly, and The New York Times Magazine.

Writing for The New Republic, Osita Nwanevu agreed that future protest movements should take Bevins' conclusions into account, and reiterated the critique of the horizontalism in the protest movements studied:

Lenin aside, this is all rather commonsensical—or at least it ought to have been for the movements surveyed. Change is best pursued with a particular tactical or ideological direction in mind, clearly; without a designated leader or group of leaders to set that direction—a "vanguard," if one prefers—one cannot predict the direction a movement will ultimately take, or what ideas and actors might prevail in the aftermath of a movement toppling the existing political order.
