= Scott Sehon =

American philosopher

Scott R. Sehon
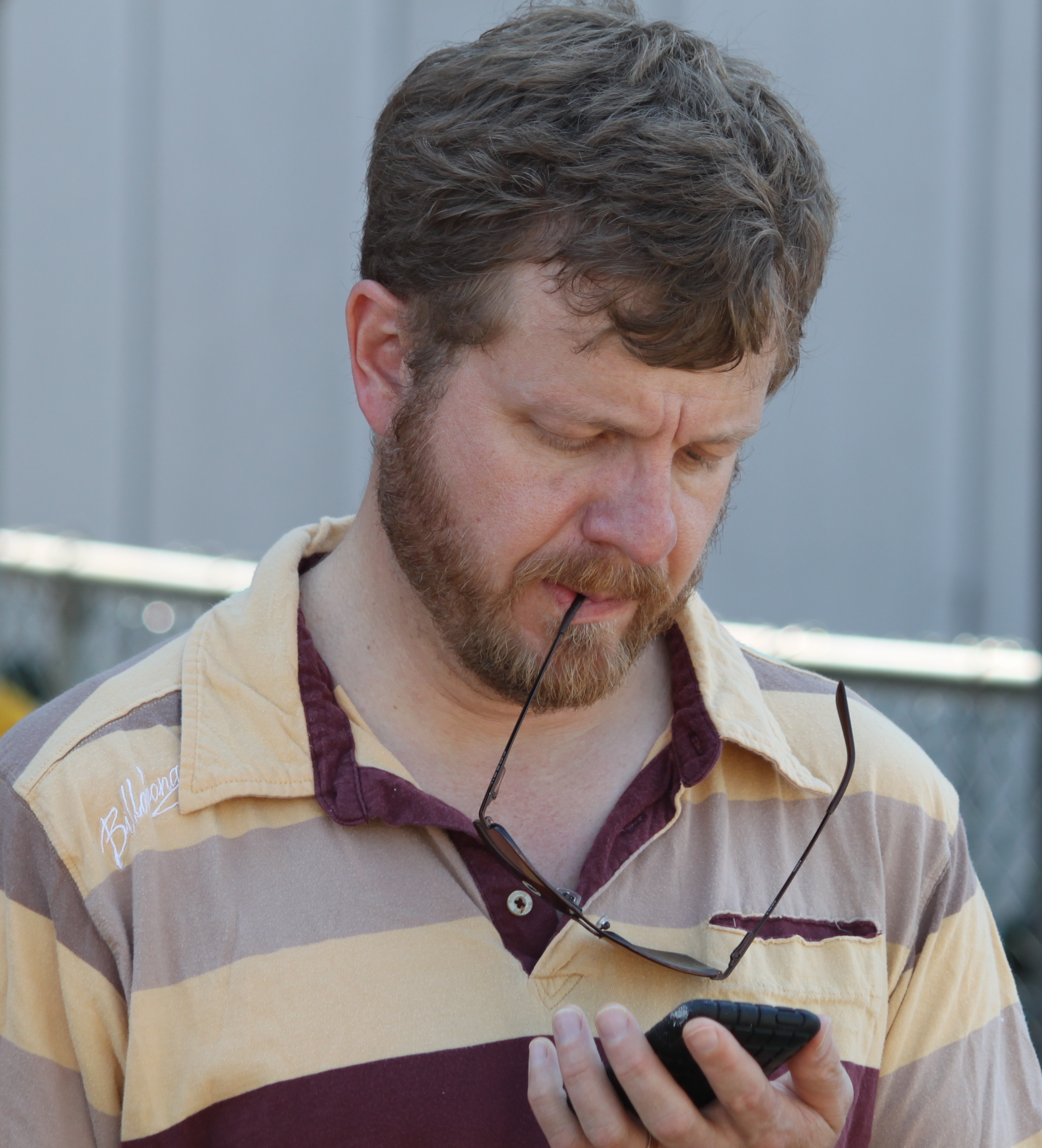
- Sehon in July 2011
- Born: November 25, 1963 (age 62)

Education
- Education: Harvard University (BA); Princeton University (PhD)

Philosophical work
- Institutions: Bowdoin College
- Main interests: Philosophy of mind Free will Socialism

Scott Robert Sehon (born 1963) is an American philosopher and the Joseph E. Merrill Professor of philosophy at Bowdoin College. His primary work is in the fields of philosophy of mind, philosophy of action, the free will debate, and socialism. He is the author of Teleological Realism: Mind, Agency and Explanation (MIT University Press, 2005) in which he takes a controversial, non-causalist view of action explanation, Free Will and Action Explanation: a Non-Causal, Compatibilist Account (Oxford University Press, 2016), and Socialism: A Logical Introduction (Oxford University Press, 2024).

Sehon has also published in the area of philosophy of religion, with a particular focus on the problem of evil and whether or not religious faith is a necessary foundation for morality. In his later work, he has criticized anti-communism and American conservative arguments against socialism.

== Education ==
Sehon received his B.A. in philosophy from Harvard University, where he worked with Warren D. Goldfarb, and earned a Ph.D. in philosophy at Princeton University, where he worked with Mark Johnston and Harry Frankfurt. His thesis was titled: "Action Explanation and the Nature of Mental States."

== Bibliography ==
Books

- Socialism: A Logical Introduction (Oxford University Press, 2024)
- Free Will and Action Explanation: a Non-Causal, Compatibilist Account (Oxford University Press, 2016)
- Teleological Realism: Mind, Agency and Explanation. (MIT University Press, 2005)

Articles

- “Davidson’s Challenge to the Non-Causalist”, with Guido Löhrer, American Philosophical Quarterly Vol. 53, no. 1 (2016): 85-96.
- Action Explanation and The Free Will Debate: How Incompatibilist Arguments Go Wrong, Philosophical Issues, Vol.22, No. 1 (2012): 351-368.
- A Flawed Conception of Determinism in the Consequence Argument. Analysis Vol. 71, No. 1 (2011):30-38.
- Teleology and Degrees of Freedom, Internationale Zeitschrift für Philosophie, Volume 17:1 (2008): 123-144
- An Argument Against the Causal Theory of Action Explanation, Philosophy and Phenomenological Research, 60:1(2000): 67-85
- Connectionism and the Causal Theory of Action Explanation, Philosophical Psychology, 11:4(1998): 511-531
- Natural-Kind Terms and the Status of Folk Psychology, American Philosophical Quarterly, 34:3(1997): 333-344
- Deviant Causal Chains and the Irreducibility of Teleological Explanation, Pacific Philosophical Quarterly 78:2 (1997): 195-213
- Teleology and the Nature of Mental States, American Philosophical Quarterly, 31 (1994): 63-72
- Dementors, Horcruxes, and Immortality: The Soul in Harry Potter,” in Harry Potter and Philosophy: Hogwarts for Muggles, William Irwin and Gregory Bassham, eds. Wiley (2010).
- “Teleological Explanation,” in Blackwell Companion to Philosophy of Action, Timothy O’Connor and Constantine Sandis, eds. Blackwell. (2010).
