= Anti-communist mass killings =

Politically motivated mass killings of communists

Anti-communist mass killings, anti-communist genocides or genocides against communists are forms of political cleansing of population involving violence such as genocide and mass killings of communists, alleged communists, or their alleged supporters which were committed by anti-communists and political organizations or governments which opposed communism. The communist movement has faced opposition since it was founded and the opposition to it has often been organized and violent.

Many anti-communist mass killing campaigns waged during the Cold War were supported and backed by the United States and its Western Bloc allies. Some U.S.-supported mass killings, including the Indonesian mass killings of 1965–66 and the killings by the Guatemalan military during the Guatemalan Civil War, are considered acts of genocide. Academic scholarship has increasingly applied the label of genocide to specific anti-communist mass killings. The 1965–1966 Indonesian massacres, in particular, have been explicitly classified as genocide by a range of scholars, with some analyses framing the violence as a genocide perpetrated against a political group.

In Nazi Germany and the countries occupied by it during World War II, anti-communism was one of the motivations for the Holocaust, the extermination of the Jews, who were perceived as creators of the "Jewish Bolshevism"; during the revolutions after World War I, the "Jewish Bolshevism" conspiracy theory justified the antisemitic violence carried out by anti-communist counter-revolutionary troops in the former Russian Empire and Hungary.

== Background ==
=== White Terror ===
White Terror is a term that was coined during the French Revolution in 1795 in order to denote all forms of counter-revolutionary violence, referring to the solid white flag of the loyalists to the French throne. Since then, historians and individual groups have both used the term White Terror in order to refer to coordinated counter-revolutionary violence in a broader sense. In the course of history, many White Terror groups have persecuted, attacked, and killed communists, alleged communists and communist-sympathizers as part of their counter-revolutionary and anti-communist agendas. Historian Christian Gerlach wrote that "when both sides engaged in terror, the 'red' terror usually paled in comparison with the 'white'", and cited the crushing of the Paris Commune, the terrors of the Spanish Civil War, and the Indonesian mass killings of 1965–66 as examples.

== Americas ==
Latin America was ravaged by many bloody civil wars and mass killings during the 20th century. Most of these conflicts were politically motivated, or they revolved around political issues, and anti-communist mass killings were committed during several of them.

=== Argentina ===
From 1976 to 1983, the military dictatorship of Argentina, the National Reorganization Process under Jorge Rafael Videla, organized the arrest and execution of between 9,000 and 30,000 civilians suspected of communism or other leftist sympathies during a period of state terror. Children of the victims were sometimes given a new identity and forcibly adopted by childless military families. Held to account in the 2000s, the perpetrators of the killings argued that their actions were a necessary part of a "war" against Communism. This campaign was part of a broader anti-communist operation called Operation Condor, which involved the repression and assassination of thousands of left-wing dissidents and alleged communists by the coordinated intelligence services of the Southern Cone countries of Latin America, which was led by Pinochet's Chile and supported by the United States.

=== El Salvador ===
==== La Matanza ====
In 1932, a Communist Party-led insurrection against the Salvadoran military dictatorship of Maximiliano Hernández Martínez was brutally suppressed by the Salvadoran Armed Forces, resulting in the deaths of 30,000 peasants.

==== Salvadoran Civil War ====
The Salvadoran Civil War (1979–1992) was a conflict between the military-led government of El Salvador and a coalition of five left-wing guerrilla organizations that was known collectively as the Farabundo Martí National Liberation Front (FMLN). A coup on 15 October 1979 led to the killings of anti-coup protesters by the government as well as anti-disorder protesters by the guerrillas and it is widely seen as the tipping point toward civil war.

By January 1980, the left-wing political organizations united to form the Coordinated Revolutionaries of the Masses (CRM). A few months later, the left-wing armed groups united to form the Unified Revolutionary Directorate (DRU). It was renamed the FMLN following its merger with the Communist Party in October 1980.

The full-fledged civil war lasted for more than 12 years and saw extreme violence from both sides. It also included the deliberate terrorizing and targeting of civilians by death squads, the recruitment of child soldiers and other violations of human rights, mostly by the military. An unknown number of people "disappeared" during the conflict and the United Nations reports that more than 75,000 were killed. The United States contributed to the conflict by providing large amounts of military aid to the government of El Salvador during the Carter and Reagan administrations.

=== Guatemala ===
Massacres, forced disappearances, torture and summary executions of guerrillas and especially civilian collaborators of the communist Guerrilla Army of the Poor at the hands of United States-backed Armed Forces of Guatemala had been widespread since 1965. It was a longstanding policy of the military regime and known by United States officials. A report from 1984 discussed "the murder of thousands by a military government that maintains its authority by terror". Human Rights Watch described extraordinarily cruel actions by the armed forces, mostly against unarmed civilians.

The repression reached genocidal levels in the predominantly indigenous northern provinces where guerrillas of the Guerrilla Army of the Poor operated. There, the Guatemalan military viewed the Maya peoples, traditionally seen as subhumans, as being supportive of the guerrillas and began a campaign of wholesale killings and disappearances of Mayan peasants. While massacres of Indigenous peasants had occurred earlier in the war, the systematic use of terror against the Indigenous population began around 1975 and peaked during the first half of the 1980s. An estimated 200,000 Guatemalans were killed during the Guatemalan Civil War, including at least 40,000 persons who "disappeared". Of the 42,275 individual cases of killing and "disappearances" documented by the CEH, 93% were killed by government forces. 83% of the victims were Maya and 17% Ladino.

== Asia ==
The political and ideological struggles in Asia during the 20th century frequently involved communist movements. Anti-communist mass killings were committed on a large scale in Asia.

=== Mainland China ===
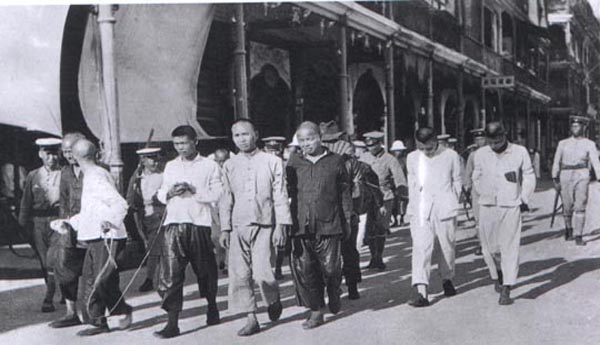
KMT troops rounding up Communist POWs

The Shanghai massacre of April 12, 1927 was a violent suppression of Chinese Communist Party (CCP) organizations in Shanghai by the military forces of Chiang Kai-shek's conservative faction in the Kuomintang (KMT). Following the incident, the latter carried out a full-scale purge of communists in all areas under their control and even more violent suppressions occurred in cities such as Guangzhou and Changsha. The purge led to an open split between the left- and right-wings of the KMT, with Chiang Kai-shek establishing himself as the leader of the right-wing at Nanjing in opposition to the original left-wing KMT government led by Wang Jingwei in Wuhan.

Before dawn on April 12, gang members began to attack district offices controlled by the union workers, including Zhabei, Nanshi and Pudong. Under an emergency decree, Chiang ordered the 26th Army to disarm the workers' militias, which resulted in more than 300 people being killed and wounded. The union workers organized a mass meeting to denounce Chiang on April 13 and thousands of workers and students went to the headquarters of the 2nd Division of the 26th Army to protest. Soldiers opened fire, killing 100 and wounding many more. Chiang dissolved the provisional government of Shanghai, labor unions and all other organizations under Communist control and he reorganized a network of unions with allegiance to the Kuomintang under the control of Du Yuesheng. Over 1,000 communists were arrested, some 300 were executed and more than 5,000 went missing. Western news reports later nicknamed General Bai "The Hewer of Communist Heads".

Some National Revolutionary Army commanders with communist backgrounds who were graduates of the Whampoa Military Academy kept their sympathies hidden and were not arrested and many of them switched their allegiance to the communists after the start of the Chinese Civil War.

The twin rival KMT governments, known as the Nanjing–Wuhan split (Chinese: 宁汉分裂), did not last long because the Wuhan Kuomintang also began to violently purge communists as well after its leader Wang found out about Joseph Stalin's secret order to Mikhail Borodin that the CCP's efforts were to be organized so it could overthrow the left-wing KMT and take over the Wuhan government. More than 10,000 communists in Canton, Xiamen, Fuzhou, Ningbo, Nanjing, Hangzhou and Changsha were arrested and executed within 20 days. The Soviet Union officially terminated its cooperation with the KMT. Wang, fearing retribution as a communist sympathizer, fled to Europe. The Wuhan Nationalist government soon disintegrated, leaving Chiang as the sole legitimate leader of the Kuomintang. In a year, over 300,000 people were killed across mainland China in the suppression campaigns carried out by the KMT.

During the Shanghai Massacre, the Kuomintang also specifically targeted women with short hair whom had not been subjected to foot binding, presuming such "non-traditional" women to be radicals. Kuomintang forces cut off their breasts, shaved their heads, and displayed their mutilated corpses in an effort to intimidate the local populace.

==== Chinese Civil War ====
During the civil war between the Kuomintang and the communists, both factions committed mass violence against civilian populations and even against their own armies, with the aim of obtaining hegemony over Mainland China. During the civil war, the Kuomintang anti-communist faction killed 1,131,000 soldiers before entering combat during its conscription campaigns. In addition, the Kuomintang faction massacred 1 million civilians during the civil war. Most of these civilian victims were peasants.

=== East Timor ===
By broadcasting false accusations of communism against the Revolutionary Front for an Independent East Timor leaders and sowing discord in the Timorese Democratic Union coalition, the Indonesian government fostered instability in East Timor and according to observers created a pretext for invading it. During the Indonesian invasion of East Timor and the subsequent occupation of it, the Indonesian National Armed Forces killed and starved around 150,000 (1975–1999) citizens of East Timor or about a fifth of its population. Oxford University held an academic consensus which called the occupation the East Timor genocide and Yale University teaches it as part of its genocide studies program.

=== India ===
In the Indian state of West Bengal, a center of communist movements in the country, incidents of anti-Communist violence followed the Naxalbari uprising. From 1971 to 1977, the Indian National Congress (R)-led state government was notorious for conducting state-sponsored extrajudicial killings and police brutality against communists from parties like CPI(M), CPI(ML) and their pro-Chinese allies due to the Indo-Chinese border dispute whereas the pro-Soviet CPI was spared, owing to India's warm relations with Russia (see 1964 split in CPI). CPI(M) leader Promode Dasgupta described the anti-communist purge conducted by the government of Siddhartha Shankar Ray to The New York Times as follows

Almost all the left parties have now been disintegrated. By killing, by destroying, by creating terror, the police and the goondas (hired by the Congress (R) partymen) have driven out our people. Opposition meetings and demonstrations are rarely allowed. People are in hiding. In the name of the Naxalites, the opposition is being torn apart.

— Promode Dasgupta

In one notable incident, between 12 and 13 August 1971, around 120-130 Naxalite activists were killed overnight at Baranagar by Congress(R) members, allegedly with police support, and the bodies were dumped into the nearby Hooghly river.

=== Indonesia ===
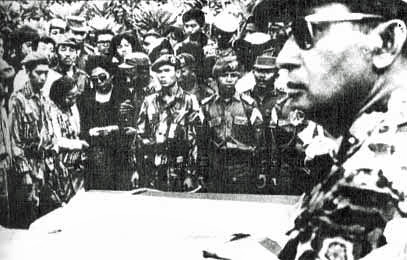
As Major General, Suharto (at right, foreground) attends the funeral for the generals assassinated in the abortive coup that led to the mass purge, 5 October 1965

A violent anti-communist purge and massacre took place shortly after an abortive coup in the capital of Indonesia, Jakarta, which was blamed on the Communist Party of Indonesia (PKI). Most estimates of the number of people who were killed by the Indonesian security forces range from 500,000 to 1,000,000. The bloody purge constitutes one of the worst, yet least known, mass murders since the Second World War. The killings started in October 1965 in Jakarta, spread to Central and Eastern Java and later to Bali and smaller outbreaks occurred on parts of other islands, most notably Sumatra. As the Sukarno presidency began to unravel and Suharto began to assert control following the 30 September Movement coup attempt, the PKI's upper national leaders were hunted down and arrested and some of them were summarily executed and the Indonesian Air Force in particular was a target of the purge. The party chairman Dipa Nusantara Aidit had flown to Central Java in early October, where the coup attempt had been supported by leftist officers in Yogyakarta, Salatiga and Semarang. Fellow senior party leader Njoto was shot around November 6, Aidit on 22 November and First Deputy PKI Chairman M. H. Lukman was killed shortly after.

As part of the broader anti-communist mass killings, the Suharto regime massacred Chinese-Indonesians on the presumption that they were necessarily part of a disloyal Communist "fifth column."

In 2016, an international tribunal in The Hague ruled that the killings constitute crimes against humanity and it also ruled that the United States and other Western governments were complicit in the crimes. Declassified documents published in 2017 confirm that not only did the United States government have detailed knowledge of the massacres as they happened, it was also deeply involved in the campaign of mass killings. Historian John Roosa contends the documents show "the U.S. was part and parcel of the operation, strategizing with the Indonesian army and encouraging them to go after the PKI." According to University of Connecticut historian Bradley R. Simpson, the documents "contain damning details that the US was willfully and gleefully pushing for the mass murder of innocent people". UCLA historian Geoffrey B. Robinson argues that without the backing of the US and other powerful Western states, the Indonesian Army's program of mass killings would not have occurred. Vincent Bevins writes that other right-wing military regimes around the world engaged in their own anti-communist extermination campaigns sought to emulate the mass killing program carried out by the Indonesian military, given the success and prestige it enjoyed among Western powers, and found evidence that indirectly linked the metaphor "Jakarta" to eleven countries.

=== Korea ===
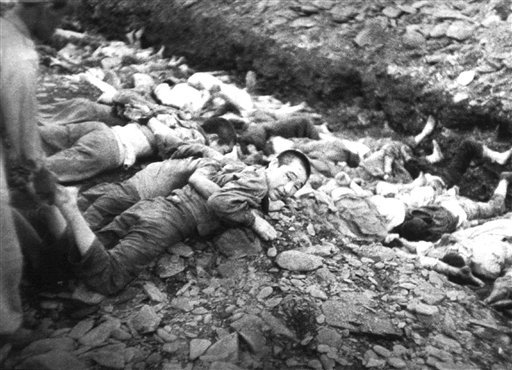
Prisoners before being shot by the military and buried in a mass grave in South Korea, July 1950

Anti-communist mass killings on the Korean Peninsula began in the late 1940s and intensified during the Korean War. The overwhelming majority were perpetrated by the U.S.-backed government of Syngman Rhee in the south, by its police and military, and by allied right-wing paramilitaries such as the North-West Youth Association.

The first large-scale episode was the Jeju uprising of 1948–1949, in which an insurrection led by the Workers' Party of South Korea was suppressed by South Korean security forces; estimates of the death toll range from 14,000 to 30,000. In October 1948, left-wing soldiers of the Republic of Korea Armed Forces rebelled in protest against the suppression of the Jeju uprising; the resulting Yeosu–Suncheon rebellion was put down by the government with the killing of at least 439 confirmed civilian victims, and provided the pretext for passage of the National Security Act the following December. In 1949, the ROK Army killed 88 villagers, many of them children and elderly, in the Mungyeong massacre, carried out under the pretext of suppressing communist guerrillas.

At the outbreak of the Korean War in June 1950, the Rhee government ordered the systematic execution of members of the Bodo League, a state-organized "re-education" association that had registered former or suspected leftists, many of whom had been coerced into joining. Most estimates place the resulting death toll between 100,000 and 200,000. A well-documented single site was the Daejeon massacre of July 1950, where between 4,000 and 7,000 political prisoners were shot and buried in mass graves.

As the front advanced and retreated, ROK police and military killed further civilians accused of collaborating with the Korean People's Army during its occupation of the south. Between 9 and 31 October 1950, the Goyang police shot at least 153 civilians at the Goyang Geumjeong Cave massacre; in late 1950 and early 1951, police and a local militia executed more than 460 villagers in the Namyangju massacre. In December 1950, following the Chinese intervention and the fall of Pyongyang, the Rhee government carried out further mass executions of political prisoners in the Seoul area; in the December massacres, more than 800 prisoners were shot on 15 December alone, witnessed by British and American troops. In January 1951, a right-wing paramilitary unit shot between 212 and 1,300 civilians in Ganghwa County during the Ganghwa massacre. The following month, the ROK Army's 11th Division, deployed for counter-guerrilla operations in the southwestern mountains, killed 705 villagers in the Sancheong–Hamyang massacre and 719 in the Geochang massacre; the latter case caused a political scandal when it was exposed in the National Assembly, leading to the prosecution of several officers.

According to professor Kim Dong-Choon, a commissioner of the Truth and Reconciliation Commission, at least 100,000 people were executed on suspicion of supporting communism, a figure which he called "very conservative." The overwhelming majority–82%–of the Korean War-era massacres that the Truth and Reconciliation Commission was petitioned to investigate were perpetrated by the Republic of Korea Armed Forces, with just 18% of the massacres being perpetrated by the Korean People's Army.

=== Taiwan ===
Thousands of people, labeled as communist sympathizers and spies, were killed by the government of Chiang Kai-shek during the White Terror (Chinese: 白色恐怖; pinyin: báisè kǒngbù) in Taiwan, a violent suppression of political dissidents following the 28 February Incident in 1947. Protests erupted on 27 February following an altercation between a group of Tobacco Monopoly Bureau agents and a Taipei resident, with protestors calling for democratic reforms and an end to corruption. The Kuomintang regime responded by using violence to suppress the popular uprising. Over the next several days, the government-led crackdown killed several thousand people, with estimates generally setting the death toll somewhere between 10,000 and 30,000 or even more. From 1947 to 1987, around 140,000 Taiwanese were imprisoned, about 3,000 to 4,000 of whom were executed for their alleged opposition to the Kuomintang regime.

=== Thailand ===
The Thai military government and its Communist Suppression Operations Command (CSOC), helped by the Royal Thai Army, the Royal Thai Police and paramilitary vigilantes, reacted with drastic measures to the insurgency of the Communist Party of Thailand during the 1960s and 1970s. The anti-communist operations peaked between 1971 and 1973 during the rule of Field Marshal Thanom Kittikachorn and General Praphas Charusathien. According to official figures, 3,008 suspected communists were killed throughout the country. Alternative estimates are much higher. These civilians were usually killed without any judicial proceedings.

A prominent example was the so-called "Red Drum" or "Red Barrel" killings of Lam Sai, Phatthalung Province, Southern Thailand, where more than 200 civilians (informal accounts speak of up to 3,000) who were accused of helping the communists were burned in red 200-litre oil drums, sometimes after having been killed to dispose of their bodies and sometimes burned alive. The incident was never thoroughly investigated and none of the perpetrators was brought to justice.

After three years of civilian rule following the October 1973 popular uprising, at least 46 leftist students and activists who had gathered on and around Bangkok's Thammasat University campus were massacred by police and right-wing paramilitaries on 6 October 1976. They had been accused of supporting communism. The mass killing followed a campaign of violently anti-communist propaganda by right-wing politicians, media and clerics, exemplified by the Buddhist monk Phra Kittiwuttho's claim that killing communists was not sinful.

=== Vietnam ===
Benjamin Valentino estimates 110,000–310,000 deaths as a "possible case" of "counter-guerrilla mass killings" by the United States Armed Forces and South Vietnam during the Vietnam War (1955–1975).

== Europe ==
The communist movement has faced opposition since it was founded in Europe in the late 19th century. The opposition to it has sometimes been violent and during the 20th century, anti-communist mass killings were committed on a large scale.

=== Bulgaria ===
In 1920s, the government of the Kingdom of Bulgaria used the failed assassination of Tsar Boris III as a pretext to open mass hunting for leftists, both Communists and members of the Agrarian Union that continued to support the deposed Prime Minister Aleksandar Stamboliyski after the 1923 Bulgarian coup d'état.

=== Estonia ===
At least 22,000 Communist Party of Estonia members, alleged communists, Soviet prisoners-of-war and Estonian Jews were massacred as part of The Holocaust in Estonia (1941–1944). As well as Jews, these killings were targeted at communists by the Nazis and their Estonian collaborators, justified by the Nazi conspiracy theory of "Judeo-Bolshevism" and the anti-Soviet sentiments of Estonian nationalists. Modern Estonia has been accused of glorifying these crimes by centre-left European politicians in recent years.

=== Finland ===
10,000 leftists were executed by the victorious White Guard forces during the White Terror of the Finnish Civil War in 1918.

=== Germany ===
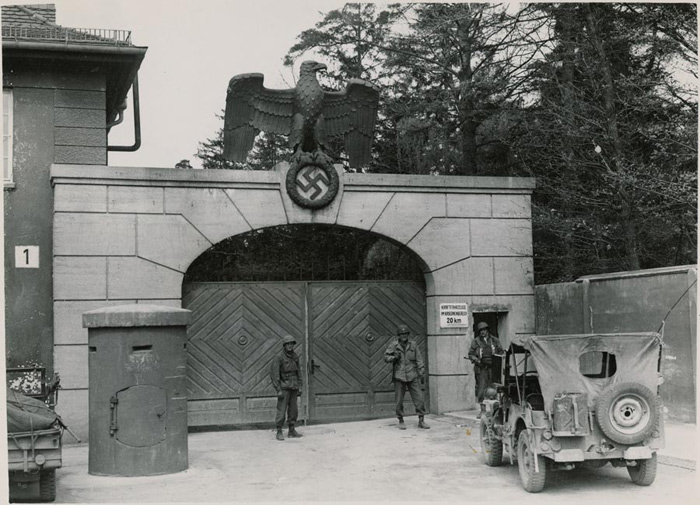
U.S. soldiers guarding the main entrance to Dachau just after liberation, 1945

German communists, socialists and trade unionists were among the earliest domestic opponents of Nazism and they were also among the first to be sent to concentration camps. Adolf Hitler claimed that communism was a Jewish ideology which the Nazi Party called "Judeo-Bolshevism". During World War II, the myth of "Judeo-Bolshevism" would become one of the ideological foundations of the Holocaust supported both by the Nazi Party and the Wehrmacht.

Fear of communist agitation was used to justify the Enabling Act of 1933, the law which gave Hitler plenary powers. Hermann Göring later testified at the Nuremberg Trials that the Nazis' willingness to repress German communists prompted President Paul von Hindenburg and the German elite to cooperate with the Nazis. The first concentration camp was built at Dachau in March 1933 and its original purpose was to imprison German communists, socialists, trade unionists and others who opposed the Nazis. Communists, social democrats and other political prisoners were forced to wear red triangles.

In 1936, Germany concluded the international Anti-Comintern Pact with the Empire of Japan in order to fight against the Comintern. After the German assault on communist Russia in 1941, the Anti-Comintern Pact was renewed, with many new signatories who were from the occupied states across Europe and it was also signed by the governments of Turkey and El Salvador. Thousands of communists in German-occupied territory were arrested and subsequently sent to German concentration camps. Whenever the Nazis conquered a new piece of territory, members of communist, socialist and anarchist groups were normally the first persons to be immediately detained or executed. On the Eastern Front, this practice was in keeping with Hitler's Commissar Order in which he ordered the summary execution of all political commissars who were captured among Soviet soldiers as well as the execution of all Communist Party members in German held territory. The Einsatzgruppen carried out these executions in the east.

==== The Holocaust ====
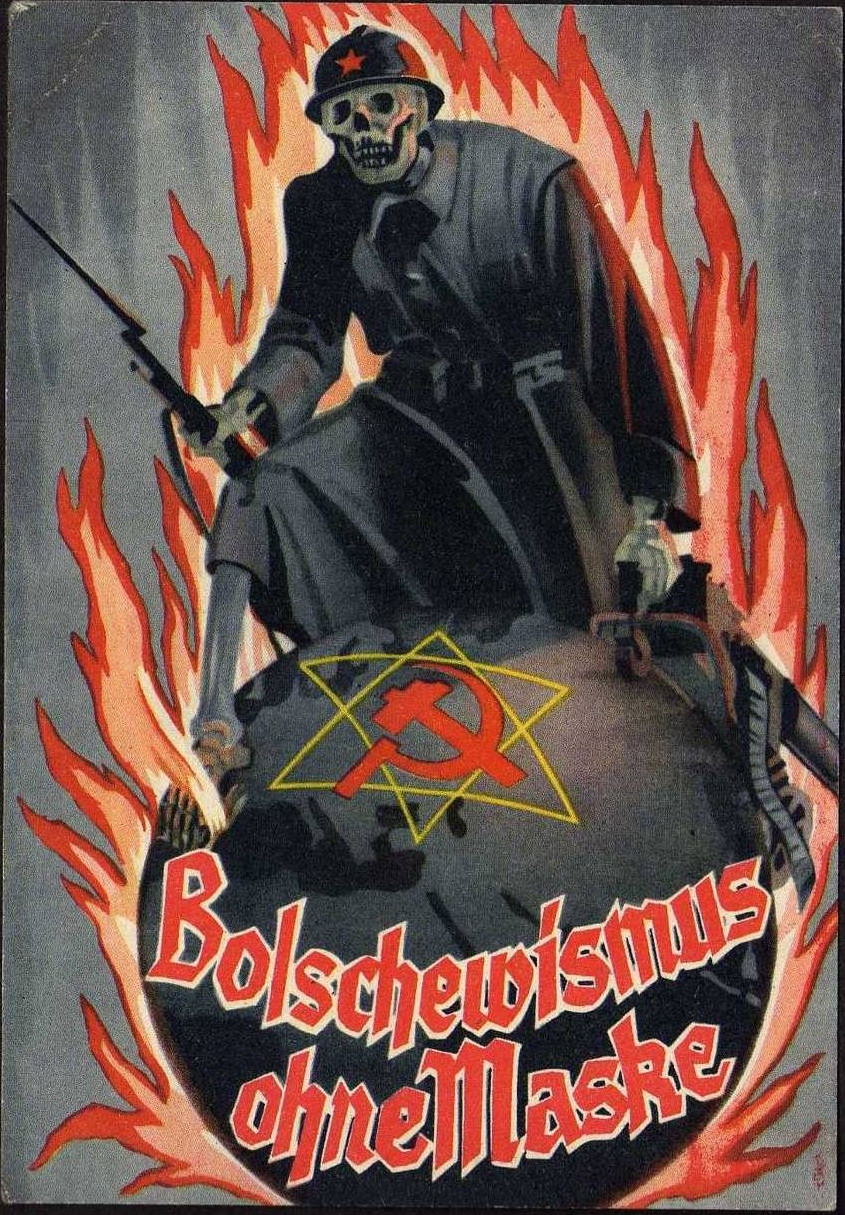
Nazi German propaganda poster "Bolshevism without the Mask"

Among the motivations for the Holocaust was the belief shared both by the Nazis and by the army that Jews were responsible for Communism ("Bolshevism"), which they perceived as a threat to the "Western Civilization". While the myth of "Jewish Bolshevism" was one of the cornerstones of the Nazi racial doctrines, it was also widespread in the army, as many commanders and soldiers shared anti-Communism of the Nazis and supported the idea of extermination of anything "Bolshevist", including the Jewry as its alleged racial root; this understanding originated in the interwar period, during which the right-wing propaganda spread antisemitism by blaming the Jews for the defeat of Germany in World War I, what became known as the "Stab-in-the-back myth", for national humiliation after the war brought upon Germany by a left-wing Jewish conspiracy against the "undefeated" army, and for the Revolution of 1918 which ended the German Empire, and for the socialist and communist upheavals in post-war Germany. The identification of "Bolshevism" with the Jewry became generally accepted in Nazi Germany, and during World War II, the extermination of the Jews as a war against communism and Nazi mass killings were justified even by the army commanders who did not share the ideology of Nazism. More to it, the Jewry was identified with the anti-Fascist partisan movements in the occupied territories, and the extermination of the Jews was justified as measures of counterinsurgency and self-defense against an armed enemy: the Nazis believed that the Jews necessarily needed to be partisans, since they were the racial root of the partisan movement, what made the Jews perceived as a necessarily armed enemy, since the Jews had to be partisans. On these grounds, for example, in the German-occupied Serbia, the Wehrmacht systematically executed male Jews as partisans.

=== Greece ===
The disarmament of the communist-dominated EAM-ELAS resistance movement in the aftermath of the Treaty of Varkiza (February 1945) was followed by period of political and legal repression of leftists by the Kingdom of Greece. The government's stance facilitated the creation of a total of 230 right wing paramilitary bands, which numbered 10,000 to 18,000 members in July 1945. The right wing death squads engaged in the organized persecution of Greek leftists, which came to be known as the White Terror. In the period between the Treaty of Varkiza and the 1946 election, right-wing terror squads committed 1,289 murders, 165 rapes, 151 kidnappings and forced disappearances. 6,681 people were injured, 32,632 tortured, 84,939 arrested and 173 women were shaved bald. Following the victory of the United Alignment of Nationalists on 1 April 1946 and until 1 May of the same year, 116 leftists were murdered, 31 injured, 114 tortured, 4 buildings were set aflame and 7 political offices were ransacked.

=== Spain ===
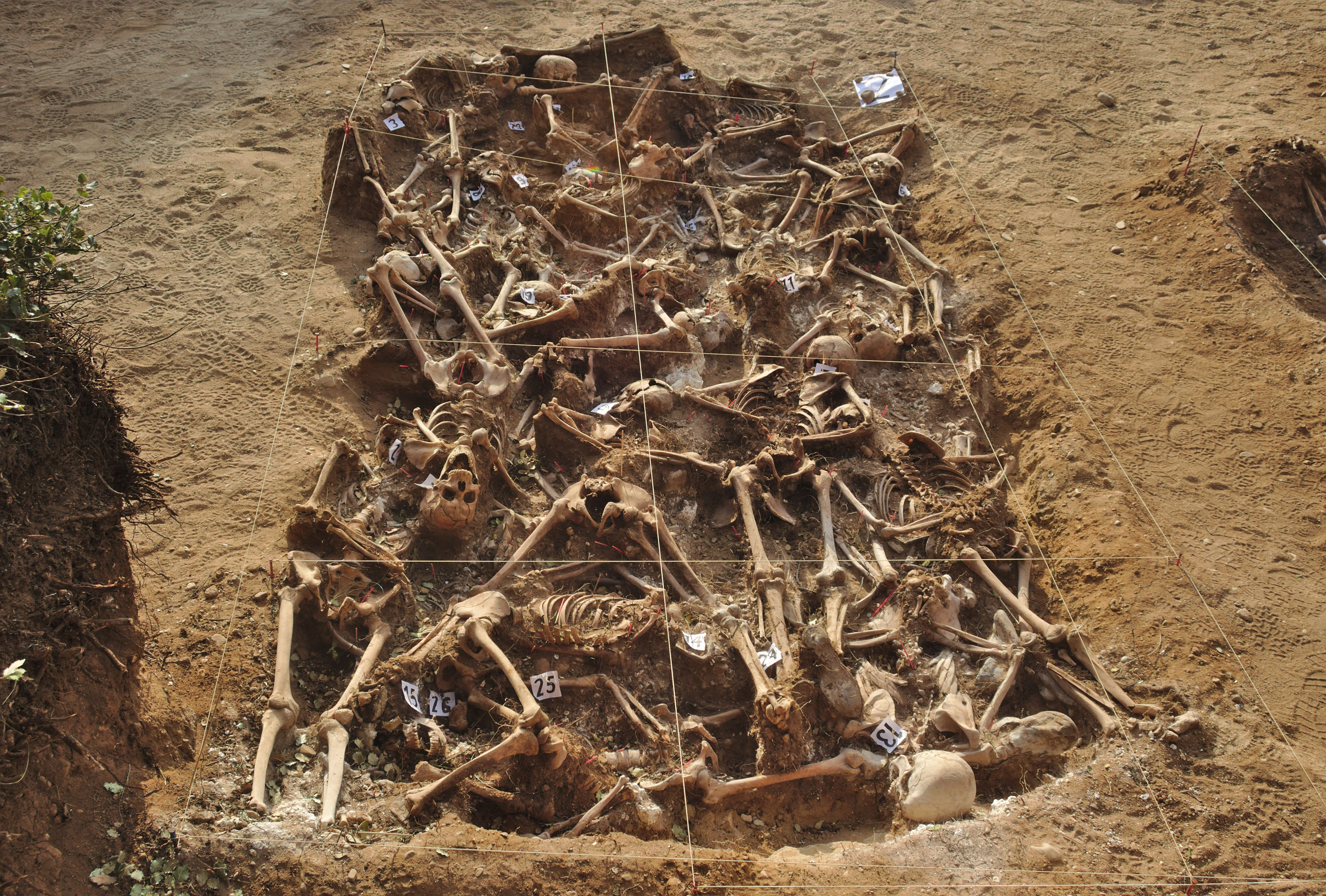
Twenty-six republicans executed by Francoists at the beginning of the Spanish Civil War.

In Spain, the White Terror (or the "Francoist Repression") refers to the atrocities committed by the Nationalists during the Spanish Civil War as well as the atrocities that were committed afterwards in Francoist Spain (1936–1975).

Most historians agree that the death toll of the White Terror was higher than that of the Red Terror (1936). While most estimates of Red Terror deaths range from 38,000 to 55,000, most estimates of White Terror deaths range from 150,000 to 400,000.

Concrete figures do not exist because many communists and socialists fled Spain after the Republican faction lost the Civil War. Furthermore, the Francoist government destroyed thousands of documents related to the White Terror and tried to hide evidence which revealed its executions of the Republicans. Thousands of victims of the White Terror are buried in hundreds of unmarked common graves, more than 600 in Andalusia alone. The largest common grave is that at San Rafael cemetery on the outskirts of Málaga (with perhaps more than 4,000 bodies). The Association for the Recovery of Historical Memory (Asociación para la Recuperación de la Memoria Historica or ARMH) says that the number of disappeared is over 35,000.

According to the Platform for Victims of Disappearances Enforced by Francoism, 140,000 people were missing, including victims of the Spanish Civil War and the subsequent Francoist Spain. It has come to mention that regarding the number of disappeared whose remains have not been recovered nor identified, Spain ranks second in the world after Cambodia.

== See also ==
- Mass killings under communist regimes
- Outline of genocide studies
- Better dead than red
- 1987–1989 JVP insurrection § Fatalities
- 1988 executions of Iranian political prisoners
- 2021 Calabarzon raids
- Death flights
- Dirty War
- Extrajudicial killings and forced disappearances in the Philippines
- Far-right politics, a range of ideologies which are considered extreme forms of right-wing politics
- Far-right subcultures
- Fundamentalism
- Guatemalan genocide
- The Jakarta Method
- Jeju uprising
- Nationalist terrorism
- Negros killings
- Operation Condor
- Radical anti-communism
- Red-baiting
- Red-tagging in the Philippines
- Religious terrorism
- Right-wing terrorism
- Shanghai massacre of 1927
- Stochastic terrorism
- Ultraconservatism
- Ultranationalism
- United States atrocity crimes

== Bibliography ==
- Armony, Ariel C. (1997). Argentina, the United States, and the Anti-communist Crusade in Central America, 1977–1984 (paperback ed.). Athens, Ohio: Ohio University Center for International Studies. ISBN 978-0-89680-196-7 – via Google Books.
- Burke, Kyle (2018). Revolutionaries for the Right: Anticommunist Internationalism and Paramilitary Warfare in the Cold War. Chapel Hill, North Carolina: University of North Carolina Press Books. ISBN 978-1-4696-4074-7 – via Google Books.
- "The tragedy of the armed confrontation". Guatemala: Memory of Silence (PDF) (Report). Guatemalan Commission for Historical Clarification. 1999. Archived from the original on 15 January 2003.
- Dinges, John (2012). The Condor Years: How Pinochet and His Allies Brought Terrorism to Three Continents (E-book ed.). New York City, New York: The New Press. ISBN 978-1-59558-902-6 – via Google Books.
- Fein, Helen (October 1993). "Revolutionary and Antirevolutionary Genocides: A Comparison of State Murders in Democratic Kampuchea, 1975 to 1979, and in Indonesia, 1965 to 1966". Comparative Studies in Society and History. 35 (4). Cambridge University Press: 796–823. doi:10.1017/S0010417500018715. ISSN 0010-4175. JSTOR 179183. S2CID 145561816.
- Fischer, Nick (2016). Spider Web: The Birth of American Anticommunism (hardcover ed.). Champaign, Illinois: University of Illinois Press. ISBN 978-0-252-04002-3. JSTOR 10.5406/j.ctt18j8x4m – via Google Books.
- Ganesan, N.; Kim, Sung Chull, eds. (2013). State Violence in East Asia (hardcover ed.). Lexington, Kentucky: University Press of Kentucky. ISBN 978-0-8131-3679-0. JSTOR j.ctt2jcp1p – via Google Books.
- Gerlach, Christian; Six, Clemens, eds. (2020). The Palgrave Handbook of Anti-Communist Persecutions (E-book ed.). Cham, Switzerland: Springer International Publishing. ISBN 978-3-030-54963-3 – via Google Books.
- Gill, Lesley (2004). The School of the Americas: Military Training and Political Violence in the Americas (paperback ed.). Durham, North Carolina: Duke University Press. ISBN 978-0-8223-3392-0 – via Google Books.
- Grandin, Greg; Joseph, Gilbert M. (2010). A Century of Revolution: Insurgent and Counterinsurgent Violence during Latin America's Long Cold War. Durham, North Carolina: Duke University Press. ISBN 978-0-8223-9285-9 – via Google Books.
- Herrán Avila, Luis Alberto (April 2015). "Las guerrillas blancas: anticomunismo transnacional e imaginarios de derechas en la Argentina y México, 1954–1972" [The White Guerrillas: Transnational Anti-Communism and Right-wing Imaginaries in Argentina and Mexico, 1954–1972] (PDF). Quinto Sol (in Spanish). 19 (1). National University of La Pampa: 1–26. doi:10.19137/qs.v19i1.963 (inactive 11 July 2025). ISSN 1851-2879 – via Scientific Electronic Library Online.
- McAllister, Carlota (2010). "A Headlong Rush into the Future". In Grandin, Greg; Joseph, Gilbert (eds.). A Century of Revolution. Durham, NC: Duke University Press. pp. 276–309.
- McSherry, J. Patrice (2005). Predatory States: Operation Condor and Covert War in Latin America (paperback ed.). Lanham, Maryland: Rowman & Littlefield. ISBN 978-0-7425-3687-6 – via Google Books.
- Menjívar, Cecilia; Rodríguez, Néstor, eds. (2005). When States Kill (hardcover ed.). Austin, Texas: University of Texas Press. doi:10.7560/706477. ISBN 978-0-292-70647-7. JSTOR 10.7560/706477 – via Google Books.
- Ruotsila, Markku (2010). "International Anti-Communism before the Cold War: Success and Failure in the Building of a Transnational Right". In Durham, Martin; Power, Margaret (eds.). New Perspectives on the Transnational Right. Palgrave Macmillan Transnational History Series (hardcover ed.). New York City, New York: Palgrave Macmillan. pp. 11–37. doi:10.1057/9780230115521_2. ISBN 978-0-230-62370-5 – via Google Books.
