= United States complicity in Gaza genocide =

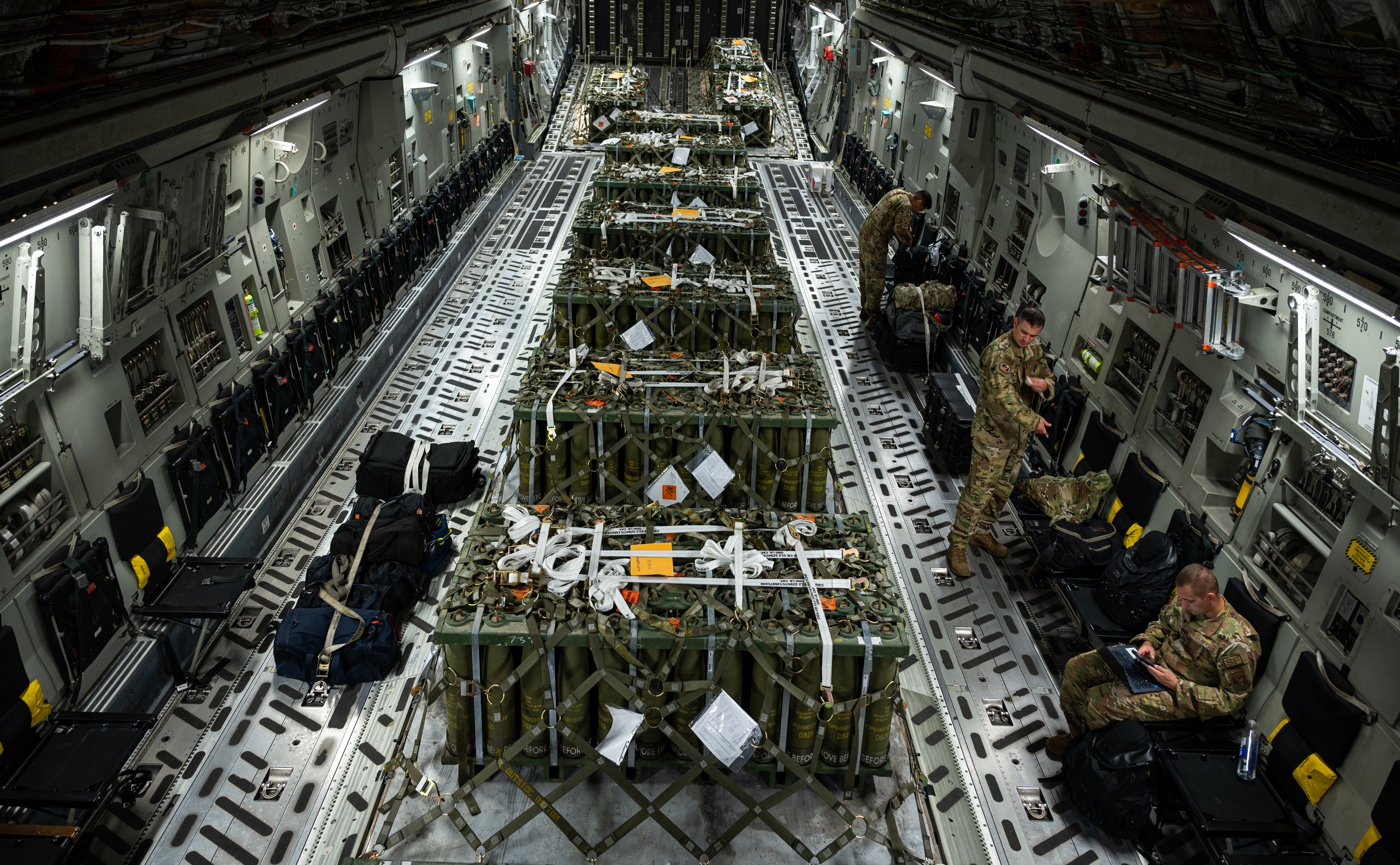
USAF airmen prepare for departure in a C-17 Globemaster III carrying ammunition to Israel, 15 October 2023, at Ramstein Air Base, Germany.

The United States has been facing widespread allegations of legal and material complicity in genocide in Gaza through its ongoing military, financial, and diplomatic backing of Israel's campaign. Retired Israeli general Yitzhak Brick acknowledged in November 2023: "All of our missiles, the ammunition, the precision-guided bombs, all the airplanes and bombs, it’s all from the US." Given this assessment, The Guardian's Mehdi Hasan has argued that "what we have witnessed in Gaza from the US government is worse than complicity. It is active participation in an ongoing genocide."

== Military aid and ammunitions ==
The United States has provided tens of billions of dollars worth of military assistance, including heavy precision-guided bombs, artillery shells, and other munitions utilized in Gaza. Human rights groups like Human Rights Watch and Amnesty International have pointed out that supplying these weapons despite documented violations of international humanitarian law breaches both United States law and international obligations.

== Diplomatic cover and vetoes ==
The United States has repeatedly used its veto power at the United Nations Security Council to block resolutions calling for immediate ceasefires, independent investigations, or arms embargoes.

== See also ==
- United States and state terrorism
- United States atrocity crimes
