= The Jakarta Method =

2020 book by Vincent Bevins

- Author: Vincent Bevins
- Language: English
- Publisher: PublicAffairs
- Publication date: 2020
- Media type: Print (Hardback)
- Pages: 320
- ISBN: 978-1541742406

The Jakarta Method: Washington's Anticommunist Crusade and the Mass Murder Program that Shaped Our World is a 2020 political history book by American journalist and author Vincent Bevins. It concerns U.S. government support for and complicity in anti-communist mass killings around the world and their aggregate consequences from the Cold War until the present era. The title is a reference to Indonesian mass killings of 1965–66, during which an estimated one million people were killed in an effort to destroy the political left and movements for government reform in the country.

The book goes on to describe subsequent replications of the strategy of mass murder, against government reform and economic reform movements in Latin America, Asia, and elsewhere. The killings in Indonesia by the American-backed Indonesian forces were so successful in culling the left and economic reform movements that the term "Jakarta" was later used to refer to the genocidal aspects of similar later plans implemented by other authoritarian capitalist regimes with the assistance of the United States.

== Synopsis ==
In the book, Bevins challenges the mainstream narrative that the third world transitioned peacefully and willingly into the modern capitalist world order. Citing declassified documents, contemporary scholarship and oral histories, he argues that the U.S.–backed mass extermination of leftists, labor organizers, unarmed reformers and anyone advocating for political alternatives in countries like Indonesia, Chile, Brazil, Guatemala and beyond served as a foundational strategy for Washington's victory in the Cold War.

== Reception ==
In the LSE Review of Books, Thomas Kingston praises The Jakarta Method as an excellent book, well researched and tightly written, which "manages to piece together events that have often been relatively unknown outside of academic or activist circles." He says while he is familiar with the Indonesian mass killings of 1965–66, he did not consider "their echoes and influence around the world" until reading this book, meaning that it would likely be informative and enlightening to most readers, and cannot be dismissed by possible critics as simply "an anti-American diatribe." Kingston remarks that towards the end of the book, Bevins offers a good example of how it would be nearly impossible to write a truly balanced account of these terrible events when he asks one of the Indonesian survivors "How did we win [the Cold War]?", who responds: "You killed us."

Writing for The American Conservative, Daniel Larison lauds The Jakarta Method as "exceptional" in its "dispassionate, matter-of-fact" reading of history that reveals aspects of American history lost in its current memory of the Cold War. Larison commends how Bevins links the accounts of individual survivors with the events that affected tens of millions and killed over a million, making solid these large, society-level events. Larison further commends Bevins for effectively "trac[ing] the use of the tactics" beyond Indonesia itself, exploring how these historical events arose from the context of international relations, influenced later anticommunist dictatorships in Latin America, and continue to affect the social and political landscape today.

Grace Blakeley and Jacob Sugarman both reviewed The Jakarta Method for the socialist magazine Jacobin. Blakeley says that The Jakarta Method explains the United States' involvement with the Indonesian genocide better than almost any other document regarding the events. She writes that the book excels at tracing how the patterns from the genocide in Indonesia reverberated through future anticommunist actions in other countries in subsequent years. Sugarman says: "As a polemic, The Jakarta Method is never anything less than conscientious and persuasive, but Bevins’s book truly takes flight as a work of narrative journalism, tracing the history of America’s violent meddling in Southeast Asia and Latin America through the stories of those it brutalized".

Glenn Greenwald of The Intercept said The Jakarta Method documents not only how CIA-sponsored mass killings in Indonesia served as a model for "clandestine CIA interference campaigns" in myriad other countries throughout Asia and Latin America to destroy the Non-Aligned Movement, but also how "the chilling success of that morally grotesque campaign led to its being barely discussed in U.S. discourse." He adds that the book "provides one of the best, most informative and most illuminating histories yet of this agency and the way it has shaped the actual, rather than the propagandistic, U.S. role in the world."

The Jakarta Method was praised as "trenchant" and "powerful" in the Boston Review by Stuart Schrader, Assistant Research Professor in Sociology at Johns Hopkins University, who says that it "documents the U.S. government’s role in fostering systematic mass murder across the globe—from Southeast Asia to South America—in the name of fighting communism." He notes that Bevins is "particularly well suited to investigate these legacies" as a journalist who is fluent in both Indonesian and Portuguese, writing:

In addition to interviewing survivors and chronicling their struggles, Bevins draws on the latest historical scholarship on the "global Cold War", which, contrary to its name, entailed hot, violent conflicts in Asia, Africa, and Latin America. He translates the findings of complex scholarly accounts into smooth and readable, if often heartbreaking, prose.

Writing for Los Angeles Review of Books, Leo Schwartz says The Jakarta Method is a "devastating critique of US hypocrisy during the Cold War, and a mournful hypothetical of what the world might have looked like if Third World movements had succeeded."

Tenny Kristiana of Waseda University writes that "by giving voice to the victims, Bevins writes in opposition to a "history written by the victors," and seeks to correct a long-standing imbalance in historiography on the Cold War."

Kirkus Reviews praised the book, describing it as "a well-delineated excavation of yet another dark corner of American history."

Gideon Rachman of the Financial Times included the book in his list of the best politics books of 2020.

== See also ==
- CIA activities in Indonesia
- Operation Condor
- United States and state terrorism
- United States atrocity crimes
