= United States atrocity crimes =

Throughout its history, the United States has been accused of either directly committing or being complicit in violations of international criminal law known as atrocity crime which includes acts of genocide and ethnic cleansing, both within the modern borders of its territory and abroad, as well as war crimes and crimes against humanity. The detailed list at the international level mainly includes killings of members of a specific group of people, which is one of the elements of the definition given by the United Nations, however this definition is including acts with mental or other physical elements not widely covered by this list. The list is also including other cases widely considered war crimes. The list at the national level attempts to include all those cases described in the 1948 UN convention on genocide.

== Domestic ==
This section provides a list of Wikipedia entries that mention acts of genocide in the territory of the United States after its independence from the United Kingdom. It includes both massacres of Native American populations, as well as other aspects of cultural genocide as defined by the United Nations.

- Native American genocide in the United States
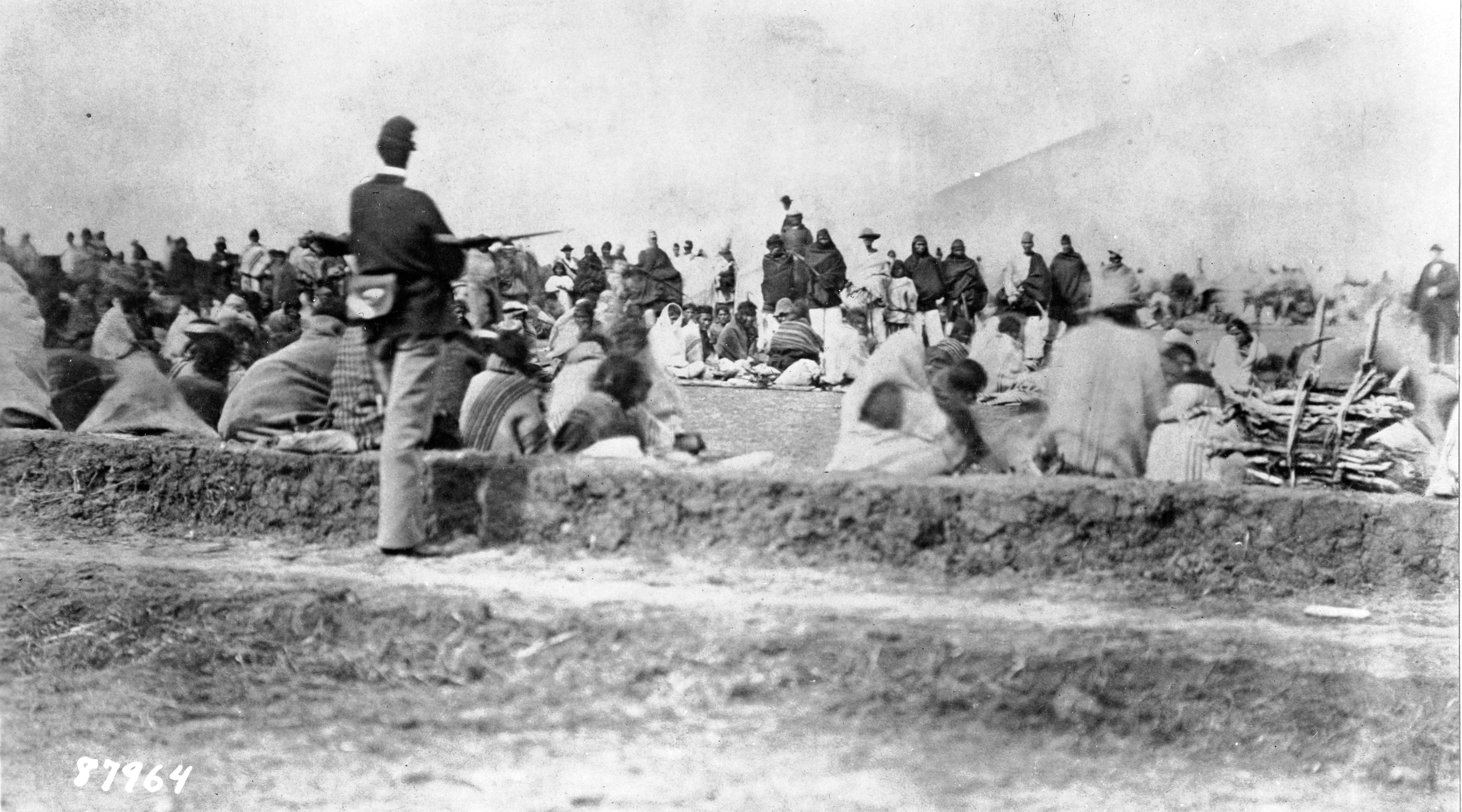
  Long Walk of the Navajo: the 1864 deportation and ethnic cleansing of the Navajo people by the United States federal government.
  - California genocide
  - Sullivan Expedition
  - Trail of Tears
  - Potawatomi Trail of Death
  - Sand Creek massacre
  - Bear River Massacre
  - Rogue River Wars
  - Snake War
  - Long Walk of the Navajo
  - Comanche campaign
  - Yavapai Wars
  - Wounded Knee Massacre
  - Dakota War of 1862
  - Gnadenhutten massacre
- Cultural genocide in the United States
  - American Indian boarding schools
- Black genocide in the United States
  - Meridian race riot of 1871
  - Opelousas massacre
  - Red summer
    - Longview race riot
  - Tulsa race massacre (Black wall street massacre)
  - Tuskegee Syphilis Study
- Slavery in the United States
  - Slavery among Native Americans in the United States

=== Other ===
- Kent State massacre
- Bonus Army
- Anti-Chinese violence in California
- Internment of Japanese Americans

== International ==
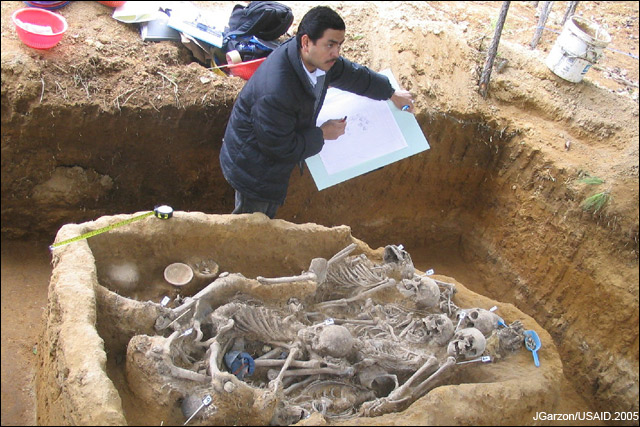
Guatemala genocide exhumation

This section lists those pages that meet the UN definition of genocide where the United States has been involved. It does not include massacres subject to dispute on Wikipedia, or acts of war such as the Hiroshima and Nagasaki bombings. In the case of Vietnam War the International War Crimes Tribunal supported the qualification as genocide, although their conclusions have been disputed, therefore the Sơn Thắng massacre and Mỹ Lai massacre are considered war crimes but not unanimously genocide. In the case of Korean War is also controversial that the United States committed a genocide or just war crimes, therefore the list is not including: No Gun Ri massacre. During the Vietnam War it has been considered that part of the war strategy of the United States in Vietnam was an ecocide.

- Bangladesh genocide (complicity)
- Indonesian mass killings of 1965–66 (complicity)
- Expulsion of the Chagossians
- United States embargo against Cuba (alleged genocide)
- Gaza genocide (alleged complicity, genocide)
- 2026 Minab school attack.

Complicity in other atrocities such as the Guatemalan genocide, the East Timor genocide, the Isaaq genocide, the Anfal campaign and Operation Condor has also been alleged.

== See also ==
- Ethnic cleansing in the United States
- United States complicity in Gaza genocide
- United States war crimes
- List of genocides
- List of genocides committed by the Soviet Union
- Canadian genocide of Indigenous peoples
- List of Indian massacres in North America
