= Vincent Bevins =

American journalist and writer (born 1984)

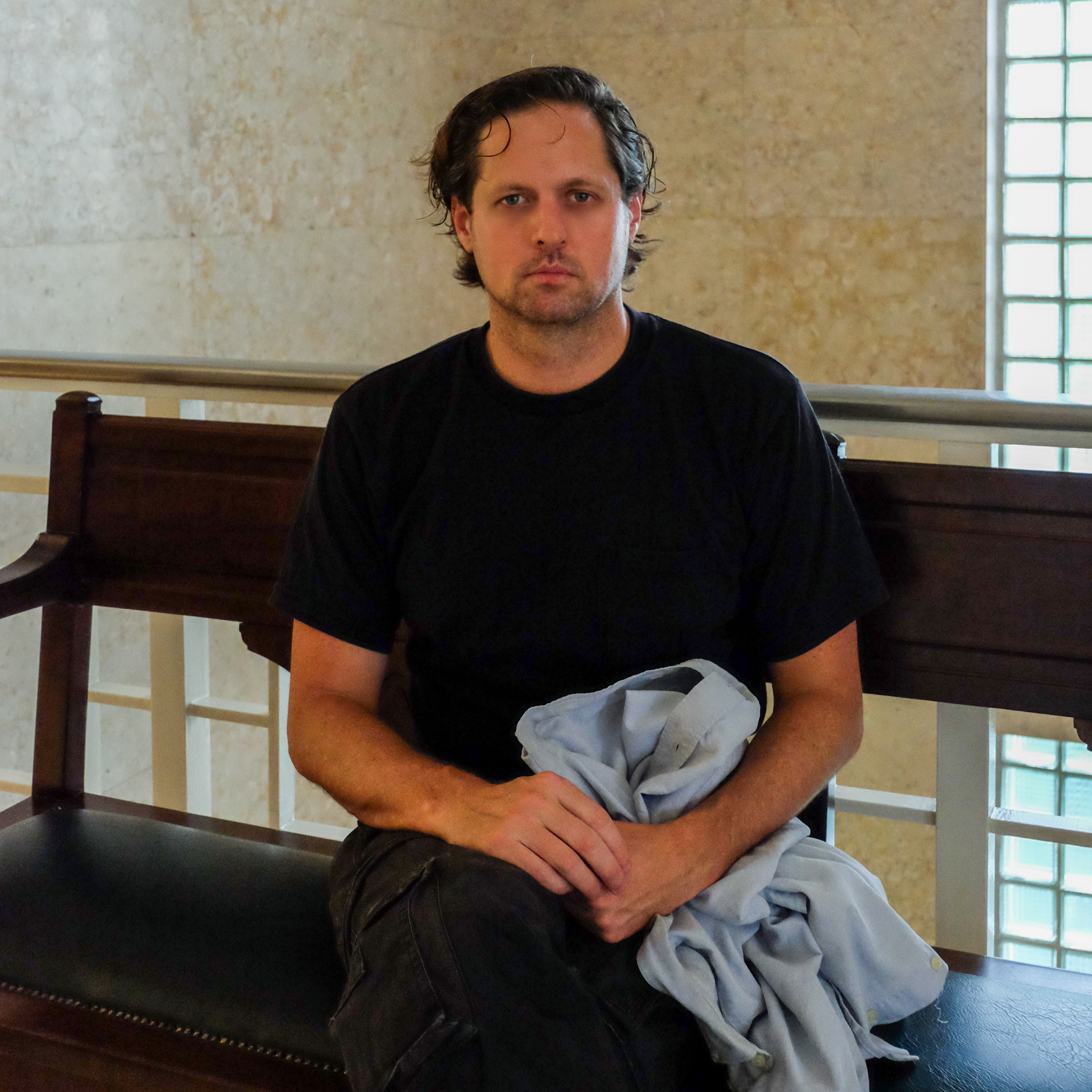
- Bevins in 2023
- Born: June 11, 1984 (age 41) Santa Monica, California, U.S.
- Occupation: Writer; Author; Journalist
- Language: English, Indonesian, Portuguese, Spanish, German
- Education: University of California, Berkeley (BA); London School of Economics (MSc)
- Genre: Non-fiction, article
- Subject: Cold War; European–American Affairs; Brexit; Brazilian Indigenous rights
- Notable works: The Jakarta Method (2020); "If We Burn" (2023)

Website
- vincentbevins.com

Vincent Bevins (born June 11, 1984) is an American journalist and writer. From 2011 to 2016, he worked as a foreign correspondent based in Brazil for the Los Angeles Times, after working previously in London for the Financial Times. In 2017, he moved to Jakarta and began covering Southeast Asia for The Washington Post. His work has mostly focused on international politics, the world economy, and global culture. In 2020, Bevins published The Jakarta Method, a book about United States Cold War violence in Indonesia and Latin America. The Jakarta Method received positive reviews as an exposé of U.S. complicity in anti-communist mass killings during the Cold War.

== Early life ==
Bevins was born and raised in California and attended Servite High School and the University of California, Berkeley. While at UC Berkeley, Bevins was a collegiate water polo player, competing in the 2002 NCAA Men's Water Polo Championship with the California Golden Bears team that finished in the final.

== Career ==
Bevins worked in Berlin before covering Hugo Chávez in Venezuela with The Daily Journal. He earned a master's degree in international political economy from the London School of Economics.

From 2012 to 2016, Bevins ran the "From Brazil" section of Brazilian newspaper Folha de S.Paulo, which published news and analysis from Bevins and other correspondents in Brazil. He and this group of journalists were at the center of reporting on the 2013 protests in Brazil.

In 2012, Bevins published an investigation on modern-day slavery in the Amazon rainforest. Pig iron companies in the state of Maranhão later that year agreed not to source charcoal produced using slave labor, deforestation, or invasions into indigenous lands. In 2016, Brazilian president Dilma Rousseff declared in an interview with Bevins that she did not believe that the United States Central Intelligence Agency was behind her impeachment.

Bevins sometimes writes for and appears in Brazilian media. He speaks fluent Portuguese and has also worked in Spanish and German.

In his 2020 book The Jakarta Method, Bevins uses declassified documents, archival research, and eyewitness reports to argue that the victory of the United States in the Cold War within the Third World was in part made possible by U.S.-facilitated extermination of local leftist and nationalist groups. The book title refers to the Indonesian mass killings of 1965–66 by the Suharto regime.

== Awards ==
Bevins has had his journalistic work recognized by the Los Angeles Press Club, the Lorenzo Natali Prize, and the Overseas Press Club.

== Bibliography ==
- The Jakarta Method: Washington's Anticommunist Crusade and the Mass Murder Program that Shaped Our World. New York: PublicAffairs. 2020. ISBN 978-1-5417-4240-6
- If We Burn: The Mass Protest Decade and the Missing Revolution. New York: PublicAffairs. 2023. ISBN 978-1-5417-8897-8
