= Robert Scherrer =

Robert William Scherrer (August 21, 1935 – November 15, 1995) was an FBI agent posted in Latin America in the 1970s. Named by journalist John Dinges as an "intelligence centre all by himself", he had extensive sources in the intelligence communities and military across the countries of the Southern Cone, and was one of the agents transmitting information from local intelligence sources to the United States as part of Operation Condor. He later participated in investigations relating to Condor's international killings, and is one of John Dinges' sources. He was the person who, in 1979, revealed the existence of "phase 3" of Operation Condor, the programme of international assassinations.

== Mission ==
Born in Brooklyn, and of German-Irish heritage, Robert Scherrer spoke Spanish almost perfectly, and had a mission to ensure the international police cooperation of Argentina, Chile, Uruguay, Paraguay and Bolivia. All of these countries were under military dictatorship since at least 1973, except Argentina, who had a brief civil intermediary period between the March 1973 Argentine general election and the National Reorganization Process, and collaborated with Operation Condor.

"Officially in charge of legal affairs at the United States Embassy in Buenos Aires" in 1975, he had been in post for six years, and travelled regularly to Paraguay, where he personally knew General Benito Guanes, Head of G2 (Intelligence Service of Staff) and Pastor Coronel, head of the DIPC.

In 1979, the head of the Dirección de Inteligencia Nacional, Manuel Contreras, declared in a judicial deposition that Robert Scherrer was: "in permanent contact with [the Condor representative in Buenos Aires] and received the information he had requested, on the files he had requested, on many occasions. (...) Equally, the CIA knew the existence of the Condor organisation, and provided it with information on many occasions.

== The inquest into the assassination of Carlos Prats (1974) ==
He also investigated the assassination of Chilean General Carlos Prats in September 1974 in Buenos Aires, receiving testimony from Michael Townley who explicitly implicated the Argentine SIDE and the Milicia, an extreme-right group, in the death.

== The arrest of Santucho and Fuentes (1975) ==
After the arrest in Paraguay, on 16, of two Chileans from the Revolutionary Left Movement (Chile), members of the Revolutionary Coordinating Junta (JCR), Amilcar Santucho (brother of Mario Roberto Santucho) and Jorge Fuentes, Robert Scherrer was informed at every moment of their interrogation (during which the militants were tortured).

He passed this information to the FBI, who interrogated presumed members of the JCR in the United States, including the wife of Fuentes. (Note: Dinges refutes the version that journalist Tim Weiner states in F.B.I. Helped Chile Search For Leftists, Files Show, New York Times, 10 February 1999, where the FBI had no trace of the militants in the United States.) He also informed courrier Chilean General Ernesto Baeza on 6 of the arrest of the Chileans (the letter was transmitted to the Rettig Commission who classed it in their "confidential" section.), after which Argentine and Chilean interrogators went to Asunción.

== Assaination of Cuban Rolando Masferrer (1975) ==
Scherrer told Saul Landau that the Cuban Rolando Masferrer, who was planning to assassinate Fidel Castro, and who was killed by a car bomb in October 1975, was killed by the Novo brothers (Guillermo and Ignacio) on the orders of Jorge Mas Canosa, leader of the Cuban American National Foundation and rival to Masferrer, whom he considered as too "moderate".

== Assassination of Torres, Letelier and the 1976 Operation Condor cable ==
A short time after the assassination in Buenos Aires of former Bolivian president Juan José Torres (2), Scherrer accumulated evidence to show that it had taken place as part of Condor.

Then, a week after the assassination of former minister of Allende, Orlando Letelier, in Washington (September 1976), Scherrer sent a cable, dated 28, describing Operation Condor, in particular "phase 3", that is, assassinations overseas. This document, which John Dinges received in 1979, two years after its declassification, was cited in a book, written by Dinges and Saul Landau, about the assassination of Letelier. According to Scherrer, it was only with the assassination of Letelier that the United States became aware of the existence of "phase 3" of Condor. John Dinges, however, has shown that this "was [false]" and that "American intelligence knew of the plans to execute the Condor Plan many months before the attack on Letelier".

Much later, this cable was also used by Joan Garcés, former assistant to Allende, in a lawsuit launched in 1996 in Spain, before Judge Baltasar Garzón and the Audiencia Nacional, accusing the military dictatorship of Chile (1973–90) and the National Reorganization Process of a "criminal cartel" known as "Operation Condor", to assassinate its political opponents.

This is also when Scherrer became aware of planned assassinations in Paris and Lisbon by Condor agents, in particular, members of the Batallón de Inteligencia 601 and the SIDE (Argentina), Uruguayans and Chileans. While these failed, the CIA offered support to its French and Portuguese equivalents due to their imminence. Another project, possibly planned from the same source, against Uruguayan Senator Wilson Ferreira Aldunate also failed, with Scotland Yard offering close protection.

== Annexes ==
=== Bibliography ===
- Letter of 6 June 1975 from Scherrer to Chilean General Ernesto Baeza (on the National Security Archives site)
- Cable from Robert Scherrer on 28 September 1976 describing Operation Condor and its "phase 3" (on the National Security Archives site)
- Cable from the American Embassy in Buenos Aires on 14 August 1975 (with clearance from Robert Scherrer) concerning the assassination of Chilean militants exiled in Argentina, and strongly urging the Minister José Lopez Rega that these may be coordinated across different services across the Southern Cone) (site of the National Security Archives, declassified document used in the trial of the ex-Uruguayan dictator Juan Maria Bordaberry, sentenced in 2010)
- Dinges, John; Bourdon, William (2005). La Découverte (ed.). Les Années Condor, comment Pinochet et ses alliés ont propagé le terrorisme sur trois continents [The Condor Years: How Pinochet and his Allies Brought Terrorism to Three Continents (2004)]. Translated by Isabelle Taudière. Paris. ISBN 978-2-7071-4424-9.
- Dinges, John; Landau, Saul (1980). Assassination on Embassy Row. New York: McGraw-Hill.
