= Operation Condor =

US-backed repression campaign in South America

- Part of the Cold War
- Main active members (Argentina, Bolivia, Brazil, Chile, Paraguay, and Uruguay) Sporadic member (Peru) Collaborator and financier (United States)
- Type: Covert operation
- Location: South America
- Planned by: Members: Argentina; Bolivia; Brazil; Chile; Ecuador; Paraguay; Peru; Uruguay; Supported: United States; France (alleged, denied)
- Target: Political dissidents (including socialists and communists)
- Date: 1975–1983
- Executed by: Intelligence agencies of participating countries
- Outcome: Concluded after the fall of the Argentinean military junta in 1983
- Casualties: 60,000–80,000 suspected leftist sympathizers killed 400–500 killed in cross-border operations 400,000+ political prisoners

Operation Condor (Spanish: Operación Cóndor; Portuguese: Operação Condor) was a campaign of political repression by the right-wing dictatorships of the Southern Cone of South America, involving intelligence operations, coups, and assassinations of left-wing sympathizers in South America. Operation Condor formally existed from 1975 to 1983. Condor was formally created in November 1975, when Chilean dictator Augusto Pinochet's spy chief, Manuel Contreras, invited 50 intelligence officers from Argentina, Brazil, Bolivia, Chile, Paraguay, and Uruguay to the Army War Academy in Santiago, Chile. The operation was backed by the United States, which financed the covert operations. France is alleged to have collaborated but has denied involvement. The operation ended with the fall of the Argentine junta in 1983.

Due to its clandestine nature, the precise number of deaths directly attributable to Operation Condor is highly disputed. Some estimates are that at least 60,000 deaths can be attributed to Condor, with up to 9,000 of these in Argentina. This collaboration had a devastating impact on countries like Argentina, where Condor exacerbated existing political violence and contributed to the country's "Dirty War" that left an estimated 30,000 people dead or disappeared. Others estimate the toll at 50,000 killed, 30,000 disappeared, and 400,000 imprisoned. An investigative commission, relying on the Archives of Terror, among other sources, allowed for the identification of 20,090 victims of the Paraguayan Stroessner regime, including 59 who were extrajudicially executed and 336 who were forcibly disappeared. According to a database by Francesca Lessa of the University of Oxford, at least 805 cases of transnational human rights violations resulting from Operation Condor have been identified, including 382 cases of illegal detentions and torture and 367 murders and disappearances. American political scientist J. Patrice McSherry estimated between 400 and 500 killed in cross border operations. She further stated that of those who "had gone into exile" and were "kidnapped, tortured and killed in allied countries or illegally transferred to their home countries to be executed ... hundreds, or thousands, of such persons – the number still has not been finally determined – were abducted, tortured, and murdered in Condor operations".

Victims included dissidents and leftists, union and peasant leaders, priests, monks and nuns, students and teachers, intellectuals, and suspected guerrillas such as prominent union leader Marcelo Santuray in Argentina or general Carlos Prats in Chile. Condor operatives participated in tactics such as death flights. In Chile, anyone suspected of being a communist sympathizer could become regarded as a terrorist by Pinochet's government and targeted by Operation Condor. Condor's initial members were the governments of Argentina, Bolivia, Chile, Paraguay, and Uruguay; Brazil signed the agreement later on. Ecuador and Peru later joined the operation in a more peripheral role. However, a letter which was written by renowned DINA assassin Michael Townley in 1976 noted the existence of a network of individual Southern Cone secret polices known as Red Condor. Declassified documents revealed that US intelligence agencies had intimate knowledge of Operation Condor through inside sources and monitored the operation.

With tensions between Chile and Argentina rising and Argentina severely weakened as a result of Argentina's loss in the Falklands War to the British military, the Argentine junta fell in 1983. The ramifications led to more South American dictatorships falling. The fall of the Argentine junta has been regarded as marking the end of Operation Condor. J. Patrice McSherry has argued that aspects of Operation Condor fit the definition of state terrorism.

== Antecedents ==
Operation Condor, which took place in the context of the Cold War, had the tacit approval and material support of the United States. In 1968, U.S. General Robert W. Porter Jr. stated that:

to facilitate the coordinated employment of internal security forces within and among Latin American countries, we are ... endeavoring to foster inter-service and regional cooperation by assisting in the organization of integrated command and control centers; the establishment of common operating procedures; and the conduct of joint and combined training exercises.

According to American historian J. Patrice McSherry, based on formerly secret CIA documents from 1976, in the 1960s and early 1970s plans were developed among international security officials at the U.S. Army School of the Americas and the Conference of American Armies to deal with perceived threats in South America from political dissidents. A declassified CIA document dated 23 June 1976 explains that "in early 1974, security officials from Argentina, Chile, Uruguay, Paraguay, and Bolivia met in Buenos Aires to prepare coordinated actions against subversive targets". According to the CIA, Operation Condor was a cooperative mission enabled by Chile, Argentina, Uruguay, Paraguay, Brazil and Bolivia. The cooperation between the countries for intelligence and security services had existed from as early as February 1974 to late May 1976 when it was formalized.

Members of Condor coordinated their activities with one another, established a special network for communication, and constructed various types of training. Some of which included psychological warfare.

The program was developed following a series of military coups d'état in South America:

- General Alfredo Stroessner took control of Paraguay in 1954.
- The Brazilian military overthrew president João Goulart in 1964.
- General Hugo Banzer took power in Bolivia in 1971 through a series of coups.
- A civic-military dictatorship seized power in Uruguay on 27 June 1973.
- Chilean armed forces commanded by General Augusto Pinochet bombed the presidential palace in Chile on 11 September 1973, overthrowing democratically elected but unconstitutionally declared president Salvador Allende.
- General Francisco Morales Bermúdez took control of Peru after a successful coup in 1975.
- The Ecuadorian military overthrew dictator Guillermo Rodríguez in 1976.
- A military junta headed by General Jorge Rafael Videla seized power in Argentina on 24 March 1976.

American journalist A. J. Langguth states in a 1978 book that the organization of the first meetings between Argentine and Uruguayan security officials, concerning the watching (and subsequent disappearance or assassination) of political refugees in these countries, can be attributed to coordination by the CIA, and that the CIA also acted as an intermediary in meetings between Argentine, Brazilian, and Uruguayan death squads.

The National Security Archive reported, "Founded by the Pinochet regime in November 1975, Operation Condor was the codename for a formal Southern Cone collaboration that included transnational secret intelligence activities, kidnapping, torture, disappearance and assassination, according to the National Security Archive's documentary evidence from U.S., Paraguayan, Argentine, and Chilean files". Under this codename mission, several people were killed. As the report stated, "Prominent victims of Condor include two former Uruguayan legislators and a former Bolivian president, Juan José Torres, murdered in Buenos Aires, a former Chilean Minister of the Interior, Bernardo Leighton, as well as former Chilean ambassador Orlando Letelier and his 26-year old American colleague, Ronni Moffitt, assassinated by a car bomb in downtown Washington D.C".

== History ==
Cooperation among various security services had existed prior to the creation of Operation Condor, with the aim of "eliminating Marxist subversion". During the Conference of American Armies held in Caracas on 3 September 1973, Brazilian General Breno Borges Fortes, head of the Brazilian army, proposed to "extend the exchange of information" between various services to "struggle against subversion".

In March 1974, representatives of the police forces of Chile, Uruguay and Bolivia met with Alberto Villar, deputy chief of the Argentine Federal Police and co-founder of the Triple A death squad, to implement cooperation guidelines. Their goal was to destroy the "subversive" threat represented by the presence of thousands of political exiles in Argentina. In August 1974, the corpses of Bolivian refugees were found in garbage dumps in Buenos Aires. In 2007, McSherry also confirmed the abduction and torture during this period of Chilean and Uruguayan refugees who were living in Buenos Aires, based on newly declassified CIA documents dated June 1976.

On 25 November 1975, General Augusto Pinochet's 60th birthday, leaders of the military intelligence services of Argentina, Bolivia, Chile, Paraguay, and Uruguay met with Manuel Contreras, chief of DINA (the Chilean secret police), in Santiago de Chile, officially creating the Plan Condor. According to French journalist Marie-Monique Robin, author of Escadrons de la mort, l'école française (2004, Death Squads, The French School), General Rivero, intelligence officer of the Argentine Armed Forces and former student of the French, developed the concept of Operation Condor.

Based on the governments' perception of threats, officially the targets were armed groups (such as the MIR, the Montoneros or the ERP, the Tupamaros, etc.), but the governments broadened their attacks against all kinds of political opponents, including their families and others, as reported by the Valech Commission. The Argentine "Dirty War", for example, which resulted in approximately 30,000 victims according to most estimates, kidnapped, tortured and killed many trade-unionists, relatives of activists, social activists such as founders of the Mothers of the Plaza de Mayo, nuns, university professors, etc.

From 1976 onwards, the Chilean DINA and its Argentine counterpart, SIDE, were the operation's front-line troops. The infamous "death flights", theorized in Argentina by Luis María Mendía – and previously used during the Algerian War (1954–1962) by French forces – were widely used. Government forces took victims by plane or helicopter out to sea, dropping them to their deaths in planned disappearances. It was said that from this military bombardment that OPR-33 infrastructure located in Argentina was destroyed. In May 1976, members of Plan Condor met in Santiago, Chile, at which the participating countries discussed "long-range cooperation... [that] went well beyond information exchange" and were given code names. In July, the CIA gathered intelligence that members of Plan Condor had the intention of striking "against leaders of indigenous terrorist groups residing abroad".

In June 1976, U.S. Secretary of State Henry Kissinger received a Briefing Memorandum from the State Department's Bureau of Intelligence and Research. The briefing concluded that evidence supported Argentina's state security forces taking part in extrajudicial killings. However, there was not sufficient evidence to show that other South American governments (Brazil, Bolivia, Chile, Paraguay and Uruguay) were running a targeted assassination program. "There is no evidence to support a contention that Southern Cone governments are cooperating in some sort of international "Murder Inc." aimed at leftist political exiles resident in one of their countries". However, in Argentina, "assassinations are the work of right-wingers, some of whom are security personnel. Argentine President Videla probably does not condone or encourage what is happening, but neither does he appear capable of stopping it".

This conclusion was somewhat contradicted in a report written from Assistant Secretary of State for Latin America Harry W. Shlaudeman to Henry Kissinger on 3 August 1976, it was reported that the military regimes in South America were coming together to join forces for security reasons. They were concerned about the spread of Marxism and the implications that this could have on their grasp on power. This new force operated in other member's countries in secrecy. Their goal: to seek and kill terrorists of the "Revolutionary Coordinating Committee" in their own countries and in Europe. Shlaudeman expressed concern that the "siege mentality" that permeated the members of Operation Condor could lead to a larger chasm between the military and civilian institutions in the region. He was also fearful that this could lead to increasing isolation of these countries from developed Western nations. He believed that there was justification to some of their fears, noting that Uruguayan Foreign Minister Blanco's use of the term "Third World War" seemed intended to justify harsh and sweeping "wartime" measures, and emphasizing the international and institutional aspect, thereby justifying the exercise of powers outside national borders. Yet he felt that by reacting too strongly these countries could engender a strong terrorist counter reaction similar to the PLO in Israel. In a report later that month dated 30 August, sent to Kissinger, Shlaudeman expresses repeated concern that assassinations' could seriously damage these countries international reputation, which were U.S. allies. In this memo to Kissinger, Shlaudeman says: "What we are trying to head off is a series of international murders that could do serious damage to the international status and reputation of the countries involved". One month later in September, there is evidence that there was disagreement between Kissinger and the State Department over telling these nations to discontinue assassinations'.

U.S. documents dated 17 April 1977, listed both Chile and Argentina as active in using communications media for the purpose of broadcasting propaganda. The objective of the propaganda had two purposes. The first purpose was to defuse/counter criticism of the governments involved by foreign media and the second was to cultivate national pride in the local populace. One propaganda piece created by Chile entitled, "Chile after Allende", was distributed amongst the governments acting under Condor. However, the document notes only that Uruguay and Argentina were the only two countries to acknowledge the agreement. Paraguay's government was listed only as using the local press, "Patria", as its main propaganda producer. A meeting that was to have taken place in March 1977, discussing "Psychological warfare techniques against terrorists and leftist extremists", was canceled due to the restructuring of the intelligence services of both Argentina and Paraguay.

In late 1977, due to unusual storms, numerous corpses washed up on beaches south of Buenos Aires, producing evidence of some of the government's victims. There were also hundreds of cases of babies and children being taken from mothers in prison who had been kidnapped and later disappeared; the children were handed over in illegal adoptions to families and associates of the regime. The CIA also reported that Operation Condor countries took very well to the idea of working together, and developed their own communications network and combined training initiatives in areas such as psychological warfare.

A 2016 declassified CIA report dated 9 May 1977, titled "Counterterrorism in the Southern Cone", underscored one "aspect of the program involving Chile, Uruguay, and Argentina envisages illegal operations outside Latin America against exiled terrorists, particularly in Europe". "The military-controlled governments of the Southern Cone", the document read, "all consider themselves targets of international Marxism". The document highlighted Condor's fundamental characteristic, constituting as part of a long tried "regional approach" to pacifying "subversion", came to fruition in early 1974 when "security officials from all of the member countries, except Brazil, agreed to establish liaison channels and to facilitate the movement of security officers on government business from one country to the other". One of Condor's "initial aims" was the "exchange of information on the Revolutionary Coordinating Junta (RCJ), an organization...of terrorist groups from Bolivia, Uruguay, Chile, Argentina, and Paraguay" whose "representatives" in Europe were "believed to have been involved in the assassinations in Paris of the Bolivian ambassador to France last May and an Uruguayan military attache in 1974". The CIA report noted that the fundamental mission of Condor was the liquidation of "top-level terrorist leaders" as well as non-terrorist targets including "Uruguayan opposition politician Wilson Ferreira, if he should travel to Europe, and some leaders of Amnesty International". Condor was also seen by the CIA to be "engaged in non-violent activities, including psychological warfare and a propaganda campaign" that used the reach of the media to "publicize crimes and atrocities committed by terrorists". Additionally, in an appeal to "national pride and the national conscience", Condor called for the citizenry comprising its member nations to "report anything out of the ordinary in their neighborhoods". However, Chile and Argentina relations eventually came to a head in 1978 when both nations fell out over their maritime frontiers in the Beagle Channel Operation.

=== Revelations about Condor ===
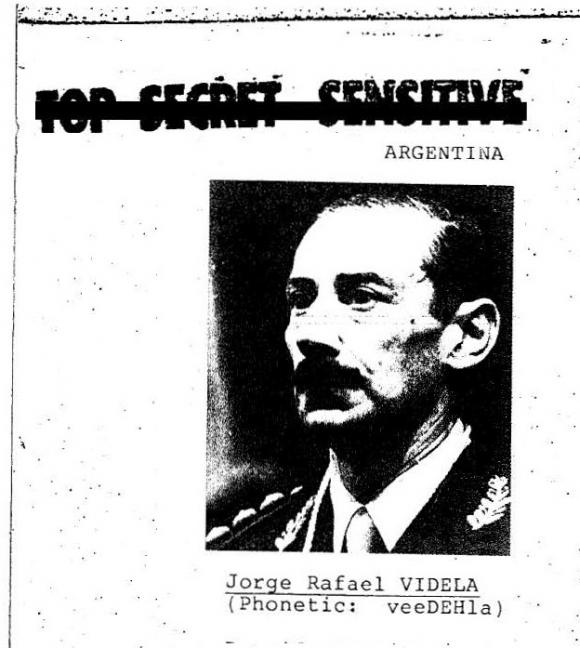
Jorge Rafael Videla

The dictatorships and their intelligence services were responsible for tens of thousands of killed and missing people in the period between 1975 and 1985. Analyzing the political repression in the region during that decade, Brazilian journalist Nilson Mariano estimates the number of killed and missing people as 2,000 in Paraguay; 3,196 in Chile; 297 in Uruguay; 366 in Brazil; and 30,000 in Argentina. Estimates of numbers of killed and disappeared by member countries during the period of operation are 7,000–30,000 in Argentina, 3,000–10,000 in Chile, 116–546 in Bolivia, 434–1,000 in Brazil, 200–400 in Paraguay and 123–215 in Uruguay. While many sources combine these numbers into a single death toll attributable to Operation Condor, killings directly linked to Condor's cross-border military and intelligence cooperation between South American dictatorships are only a small subset of the total. McSherry, for example, estimated in 2002 that at least 402 individuals were killed or "disappeared" in Condor operations: "Some 132 Uruguayans (127 in Argentina, 3 in Chile, and 2 in Paraguay), 72 Bolivians (36 in Chile, 36 in Argentina), 119 Chileans, 51 Paraguayans (in Argentina), 16 Brazilians (9 in Argentina and 7 in Chile), and at least 12 Argentines in Brazil". McSherry added that "some 200 persons passed through Automotores Orletti, the key Condor detention center in Argentina", and cautioned that "these figures are likely underestimates". In 2009, McSherry offered a range of "hundreds, or thousands ... murdered in Condor operations", acknowledging that "the number still has not been finally determined".

On 22 December 1992, torture victim Martín Almada and José Agustín Fernández, a Paraguayan judge, visited a police station in the Lambaré suburb of Asunción to look for files on a former political prisoner. They found what became known as the "Archives of Terror" (Portuguese: Arquivos do Terror), documenting the fates of thousands of Latin American political prisoners, who were secretly kidnapped, tortured and killed by the security services of Argentina, Bolivia, Brazil, Chile, Paraguay and Uruguay. The archives held a total of 60,000 documents, weighing 4 tons and comprising 593,000 microfilmed pages. Southern Cone Operation Condor resulted in up to 50,000 killed; 30,000 "disappeared"; and 400,000 arrested and imprisoned. Some of these countries have relied on evidence in the archives to prosecute former military officers. A higher number of 90,000 killed has been put forth by La Federación Latinoamericana de Asociaciones de Familiares de Detenidos-Desaparecidos (FEDEFAM).

In September 1976, Orlando Letelier, a Chilean diplomat working in Washington D.C. was killed in a car bombing. The United States did not seem to have knowledge of this murder previously. Intelligence gathered that some Americans were threatened by Condor, but the US found it difficult to accept that their ally would plan to commit acts of terror on American soil.

According to these archives, other countries, such as Peru, cooperated by providing intelligence information in response to requests from the security services of the Southern Cone nations. While Peru had no representatives at the secret November 1975 meeting in Santiago de Chile, there is evidence of its involvement. For instance, as late as June 1980, Peru was known to have collaborated with Argentine agents of 601 Intelligence Battalion in the kidnapping, torture and "disappearance" of a group of Montoneros living in exile in Lima. Brazil signed the agreement later (June 1976), but refused to engage in actions outside Latin America.

Mexico, along with Costa Rica, Canada, France, the United Kingdom, Spain, and Sweden, received many people fleeing as refugees from the terror regimes. The third phase of Operation Condor included plans to assassinate and take other measures against opponents of the military dictatorships in other countries, such as France, Portugal, the United States, Italy and Mexico. These plans were carried out in cases such as the assassination of Orlando Letelier and Ronni Karpen Moffitt in the United States. An undetermined number of foreigners were also arrested and tortured, including citizens of Spain, the UK, France and the United States. Condor officially ended when Argentina ousted the military dictatorship in 1983 (following its defeat in the Falklands War) and restored democracy. Disunity was also shown when Chile provided some military support to the U.K. during the Falklands War as well.

Historian John Coatsworth argued that the number of victims of US-backed violence in Latin America from 1960 to 1990, vastly exceeded the number of people killed in the Eastern Bloc over the same period of time.

== Notable cases and prosecutions ==
=== Argentina ===
The civic-military dictatorship of Argentina existed from 1976 to 1983 by the military juntas under Operation Condor. Within this period, the Intelligence Service of the United States reported "Chile as being the Center of its operation". Whereas the operation members included Argentina, Paraguay, Uruguay, Bolivia, and Brazil. Countries who were most enthused about the course of the Operation were Argentina, Uruguay, and Chile. On 20 September 1976, the Director of the Argentina Army Intelligence Service met "his Chilean counterpart in Santiago to deliberate on their next actions about the fundamental aims of the ‘condor.’” Following the meeting, and between the period of 24 to 27 September that same year, a joint coalition from the members of the Argentina States Secretaries for Information (SIDE), and the Uruguayan Military Intelligence Service worked to carry out an operation against the OPR-33, the Uruguay Terrorist organization in Buenos Aires. During this operation, the SIDE reported the destruction and elimination of the "entire OPR-33 infrastructure in Argentina".

As part of the effort to carry out effective mechanisms to locate, identify, haunt, and assassinate their victims, the member countries proposed the establishment of some secret team of special agents. The member countries never mind endorsing forgery and criminality as they agreed to provide "false documentation" as cover for their special agent, who themselves were either "individuals from one member nation or of patrons from various member nations". Apparently, such a "Special team" operated in Argentina, whose members were drawn from the Argentina Army Intelligence Service and the State Secretariat for Information.

The Argentine SIDE cooperated with the Chilean DINA in numerous cases of desaparecidos. They assassinated Chilean General Carlos Prats, former Uruguayan MPs Zelmar Michelini and Héctor Gutiérrez Ruiz, as well as the ex-president of Bolivia, Juan José Torres, in Buenos Aires. The SIDE also assisted Bolivian general Luis García Meza Tejada's Cocaine Coup in Bolivia, with the help of the Italian Gladio operative Stefano Delle Chiaie and Nazi war criminal Klaus Barbie (see also Operation Charly). Recently, since the opening of confidential archives, it has been discovered that there were operative units composed of Italians, used at ESMA for the repression of groups of Italian Montoneros. This unit called "Shadow Group" was led by Gaetano Saya at the time Officer of the Italian stay behind next – Operation Gladio. In April 1977, the Madres de la Plaza de Mayo, a group of mothers whose children had disappeared, started demonstrating each Thursday in front of the Casa Rosada on the plaza. They were seeking to learn the location and fates of their children. The disappearance in December 1977 of two French nuns and several founders of the Mothers of the Plaza de Mayo gained international attention. Authorities later identified their remains among the bodies washed up on beaches in December 1977 south of Buenos Aires, victims of death flights. Other members of the Mothers of the Plaza de Mayo continued the struggle for justice in the ensuing decades.

In 1980, Regional Security Officer James Blystone had met with an Argentine Intelligence Source. In the declassified memo, Blystone had asked about the disappearance for two Montoneros that had plans to travel from Mexico to Brazil to meet with other Montoneros. The Argentine Intelligence Source had explained that they had been taken and interrogated, and later contacted their Mexican and Brazilian counterparts for approval to conduct an operation to capture the other Montoneros that were expecting their arrival. Once they were under custody, they had used fake documents to check into their hotel to impersonate their presence and not alert any other Montoneros of their capture. They were imprisoned at Campo de Mayo. It was also confirmed in this memo that if a Montonero was captured and investigated to later find that they weren't a "full fledged member or combantant" they would be allowed limited freedom and able to contact their families periodically, so long as they leave the country and agree to not contact their family for months after their initial release.

After democracy was restored in Argentina in 1983, the government set up the National Commission for Forced Disappearances (CONADEP), led by writer Ernesto Sabato. It collected testimony from hundreds of witnesses about victims of the regime and known abuses, documenting hundreds of secret prisons and detention centers, and identifying leaders of the torture and death squads. Two years later, the Juicio a las Juntas (Trial of the Juntas) largely succeeded in proving the crimes of the top officers of the various juntas that had formed the self-styled National Reorganization Process. Most of the top officers put on trial were convicted and sentenced to life imprisonment, including Jorge Rafael Videla, Emilio Eduardo Massera, Roberto Eduardo Viola, Armando Lambruschini, Raúl Agosti, Rubén Graffigna, Leopoldo Galtieri, Jorge Anaya and Basilio Lami Dozo.

Under pressure from the military following these trials, Raúl Alfonsín's government passed two amnesty laws protecting military officers involved in human rights abuses: the 1986 Ley de Punto Final (law of closure) and the 1987 Ley de Obediencia Debida (law of due obedience), ending prosecution of crimes committed during the Dirty War. In 1989–1990, President Carlos Menem pardoned the leaders of the junta who were serving sentences in what he said was an attempt at healing and reconciliation.

In the late 1990s, due to attacks on American nationals in Argentina and revelations about CIA funding of the Argentine military, and after an explicit 1990 Congressional prohibition, U.S. President Bill Clinton ordered the declassification of thousands of State Department documents related to U.S.-Argentine activities going back to 1954. These documents revealed U.S. complicity in the Dirty War and Operation Condor.

Following continuous protests by the Mothers of the Plaza de Mayo and other human rights groups, in 2003 the Argentine Congress, counting on President Nestor Kirchner and the ruling majority on both chambers full support, repealed the amnesty laws. The Argentine Supreme Court under separate review declared them unconstitutional in June 2005. The court's ruling enabled the government to renew the prosecution of crimes committed during the Dirty War.

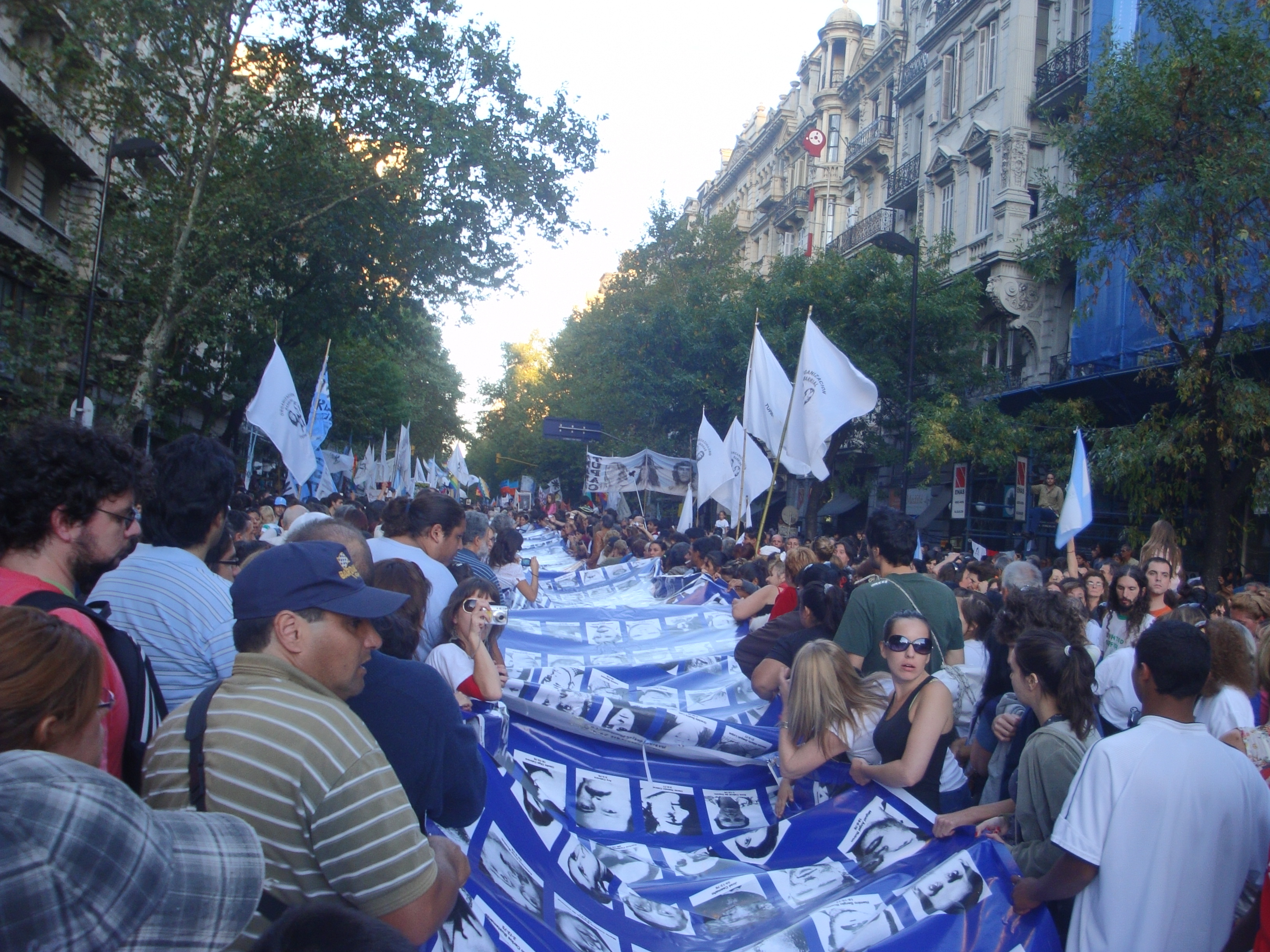
Flag with images of those who disappeared during a demonstration in Buenos Aires to commemorate the 35th anniversary of the 1976 coup in Argentina

DINA civil agent Enrique Arancibia Clavel, who was prosecuted in Argentina for crimes against humanity in 2004, was sentenced to life imprisonment for his part in the murder of General Prats. It has been claimed that suspected Italian terrorist Stefano Delle Chiaie was involved in the murder as well. He and fellow extremist Vincenzo Vinciguerra testified in Rome in December 1995 before federal judge María Servini de Cubría that DINA agents Clavel and Michael Townley were directly involved in this assassination. In 2003, Judge Servini de Cubría requested that Mariana Callejas (Michael Townley's wife) and Cristoph Willikie, a retired colonel from the Chilean army, be extradited, as they were accused of also being involved in the murder. Chilean appeals court judge Nibaldo Segura refused extradition in July 2005 on the grounds that they had already been prosecuted in Chile.

On 5 March 2013, twenty-five former high-ranking military officers from Argentina and Uruguay went on trial in Buenos Aires, charged with conspiracy to "kidnap, disappear, torture and kill" 171 political opponents during the 1970s and 1980s. Among the defendants are former Argentine "presidents" Jorge Videla and Reynaldo Bignone, from the period of El Proceso. Prosecutors are basing their case in part on U.S. documents declassified in the 1990s and later, and obtained by the non-governmental organization, the National Security Archive, based at George Washington University in Washington, DC.

On 27 May 2016, fifteen ex-military officials were found guilty. Reynaldo Bignone received a sentence of 20 years in jail. Fourteen of the remaining 16 defendants got eight to 25 years. Two were found not guilty. Luz Palmás Zaldúa, a lawyer representing victims' families, contends that "this ruling is important because it is the first time the existence of Operation Condor has been proved in court. It is also the first time that former members of Condor have been sentenced for forming part of this criminal organization".

=== Bolivia ===
In 2009, Bolivian president Evo Morales discovered the "horror chambers" underneath Bolivia's Department of the Interior. Contractors excavated the basement and uncovered blocked hallways to discover cells "where around 2,000 political prisoners were held and tortured during the 1971–1978 military rule under General Hugo Banzer". Deputy Interior Minister Marcos Farfan described his own time in the prison, where he was placed in a flooded cell, electrified from the ground, needled under his fingernails, and shocked via his genitals and teeth to extract information about Che Guevara. Nazi leader Klaus Barbie was Banzer's advisor in the methods of torture. Evidence in 1999 linked these torture chambers to Operation Condor.

Barbie's long-term presence in Bolivia, and his role as advisor to Hugo Banzer, can be traced back to Barbie's relationship with US intelligence at the end of World War II. Historians writing for the Nazi War Criminal Records Interagency Working Group (IWG) established that the U.S. Army Intelligence Counterintelligence Corps had recruited Barbie for intelligence work in West Germany in April 1947, before facilitating his escape to South America "via a 'ratline' operating through Italy". Barbie's cooperation with American intelligence was confirmed in a U.S. High Commission for Germany (HICOG) letter to New York Senator Jacob Javits. The letter established that "Barbie was arrested by the United States Occupation Forces in Germany and his wartime activities were investigated. He was released when the results of this investigation proved inconclusive...From 1948 to 1951 Barbie was, as were many other Germans, an informant for the United States Occupation forces". Once in Bolivia, Barbie adopted the pseudonym "Klaus Altman", and lived in La Paz under the cover of working for the Gehlen Organization-affiliated MEREX A.G. company, which facilitated arms deals with anti-communist Third World governments. Barbie's identity was revealed in the early 1970s, but he was not extradited to France to stand trial for war crimes until 1983. During his trial, his relationship with US intelligence became more public. Allan Ryan, Director of the Office of Special Investigations, concluded in a 1983 memorandum that "officers of the United States government were directly responsible for protecting a person wanted by the government of France on criminal charges and in arranging his escape from the law".

=== Brazil ===
President Fernando Henrique Cardoso ordered the release of some military files concerning Operation Condor in 2000. There are documents that prove that, on that year attorney general Giancarlo Capaldo, an Italian magistrate, investigated the "disappearances" of Italian nationals in Latin America, likely due to actions of Argentine, Paraguayan, Chilean and Brazilian military personnel who tortured and murdered Italian citizens during the military dictatorships in Latin America. In the case of Brazilians accused of murder, kidnapping and torture, there was a list with the names of eleven Brazilians in addition to many high-ranking military personnel from other countries involved in the operation.

In the words of the Magistrate, on 26 October 2000, "[...] I can neither confirm nor deny because until December Argentine, Brazilian, Paraguayan and Chilean militaries [military personnel] will be subject to criminal trial..."

According to an official statement by the Italian government, it was unclear whether the government would prosecute the accused military officers or not, As of November 2021, nobody in Brazil had been convicted of human rights violations for actions committed under the 21 years of military dictatorship because of the Amnesty Law has secured both governmental officials and leftist guerrillas over their crimes.

==== Kidnapping of Uruguayans ====
The Condor Operation expanded its clandestine repression from Uruguay to Brazil in November 1978, in an event later known as "o Sequestro dos Uruguaios", or "the Kidnapping of the Uruguayans". With the consent of the Brazilian military regime, senior officers of the Uruguayan army secretly crossed the border and entered Porto Alegre, capital of the State of Rio Grande do Sul. There they kidnapped Universindo Rodriguez and Lilián Celiberti, an activist Uruguayan couple of the political opposition, along with her two children, Camilo and Francesca, five and three years old.

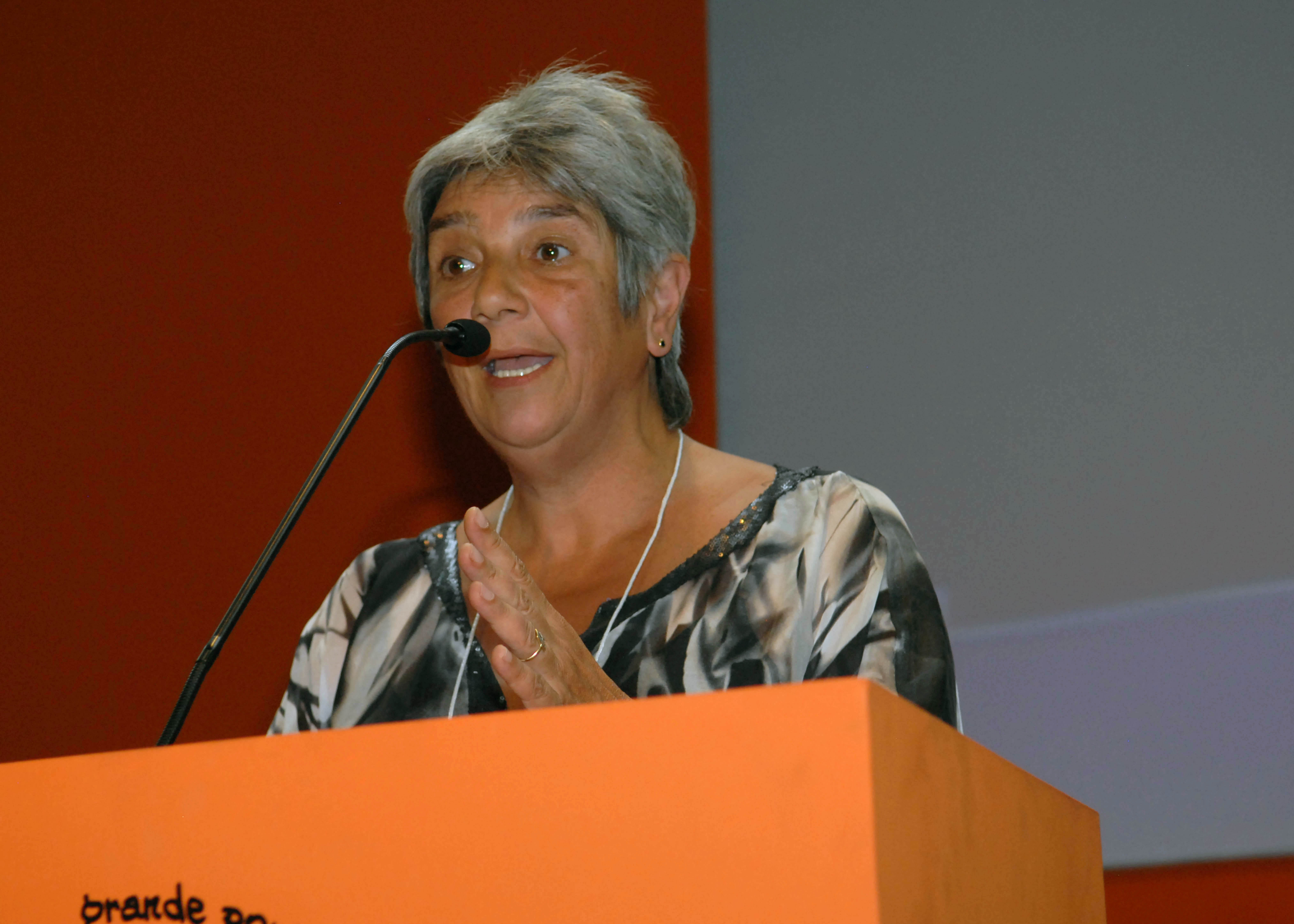
Lilian Celiberti during a speech in the World Social Forum. Porto Alegre, 2010

The illegal operation failed because two Brazilian journalists, reporter Luiz Cláudio Cunha and photographer João Baptista Scalco from Veja magazine, had been warned by an anonymous phone call that the Uruguayan couple had been "disappeared". To check on the information, the two journalists went to the given address: an apartment in Porto Alegre. When they arrived, the journalists were at first taken to be other political opposition members by the armed men who had arrested Celiberti, and they were arrested in turn. Universindo Rodriguez and the children had already been clandestinely taken to Uruguay.

When their identities were made clear, the journalists had exposed the secret operation by their presence. It was suspended. The exposure of the operation is believed to have prevented the murder of the couple and their two young children, as the news of the political kidnapping of Uruguayan nationals in Brazil made headlines in the Brazilian press. It became an international scandal. The military governments of both Brazil and Uruguay were embarrassed. A few days later, officials arranged for the Celibertis' children to be taken to their maternal grandparents in Montevideo. After Rodriguez and Celiberti were imprisoned and tortured in Brazil, they were taken to military prisons in Uruguay, and detained for the next five years. When democracy was restored in Uruguay in 1984, the couple were released. They confirmed all the published details of their kidnapping.

In 1980, Brazilian courts convicted two inspectors of DOPS (Department of Political and Social Order, an official police branch in charge of the political repression during the military regime) for having arrested the journalists in Lilian's apartment in Porto Alegre. They were João Augusto da Rosa and Orandir Portassi Lucas. The reporters and the Uruguayans had identified them as taking part in the kidnapping. This event confirmed the direct involvement of the Brazilian government in the Condor Operation. In 1991, Governor Pedro Simon arranged for the state of Rio Grande do Sul to officially recognize the kidnapping of the Uruguayans and gave them financial compensation. The democratic government of President Luis Alberto Lacalle in Uruguay was inspired to do the same a year later.

Police officer Pedro Seelig, the head of the DOPS at the time of the kidnapping, was identified by the Uruguayan couple as the man in charge of the operation in Porto Alegre. While Seelig stood trial in Brazil, Universindo and Lílian remained in prison in Uruguay and were prevented from testifying. The Brazilian policeman was acquitted for lack of evidence. Lilian and Universindo's later testimony revealed that four officers of the secret Uruguayan Counter-information Division—two majors and two captains—took part in the operation with the consent of Brazilian authorities. Captain Glauco Yanonne, was personally responsible for torturing Universindo Rodriquez in the DOPS headquarters in Porto Alegre. Although Universindo and Lilian identified the Uruguayan military men who had arrested and tortured them, not one was prosecuted in Montevideo. The Law of Immunity, passed in 1986, provided amnesty to Uruguayan citizens who had committed acts of political repression and human rights abuses under the dictatorship.

The 1979 Esso Prize, regarded as the most important prize of the Brazilian press, was awarded to Cunha and Scalco for their investigative journalism of the case. Hugo Cores, a former Uruguayan political prisoner, was the one who had called Cunha in warning. In 1993, he told the Brazilian press: "All the Uruguayans kidnapped abroad, around 180 people, are missing to this day. The only ones who managed to survive are Lilian, her children, and Universindo".

==== Alleged assassination of João Goulart ====
After being overthrown, João Goulart was the first Brazilian president to die in exile. He died of an alleged heart attack in his sleep in Mercedes, Argentina, on 6 December 1976. Because an autopsy was never performed, the true cause of his death remains unknown.

On 26 April 2000, former governor of Rio de Janeiro and Rio Grande do Sul Leonel Brizola, Goulart's brother-in-law, alleged that former presidents Goulart and Juscelino Kubitschek (who died in a car accident) were assassinated as part of Operation Condor. He asked for investigations to be opened into their deaths.

On 27 January 2008, the newspaper Folha de S.Paulo printed a story with a statement from Mario Neira Barreiro, a former intelligence service member under Uruguay's dictatorship. Barreiro said that Goulart was poisoned, confirming Brizola's allegations. Barreiro also said that the order to assassinate Goulart came from Sérgio Paranhos Fleury, head of the Departamento de Ordem Política e Social (Department of Political and Social Order) and the licence to kill came from president Ernesto Geisel. In July 2008, a special commission of the Legislative Assembly of Rio Grande do Sul, Goulart's home state, concluded that "the evidence that Jango [Goulart] was willfully assassinated, with knowledge of the Geisel government, is strong".

In March 2009, the magazine CartaCapital published previously unreleased documents of the National Information Service created by an undercover agent who was present at Goulart's properties in Uruguay. This revelation reinforces the theory that the former president was poisoned. The Goulart family has not yet identified who could be the "B Agent", as he is referred to in the documents. The agent acted as a close friend to Goulart, and described in detail an argument during the former president's 56th birthday party with his son because of a fight between two employees. As a result of the story, the Human Rights Commission of the Chamber of Deputies decided to investigate Goulart's death.

Later, CartaCapital published an interview with Goulart's widow, Maria Teresa Fontela Goulart, revealing documents from the Uruguayan government detailing her complaints that her family had been monitored. The Uruguayan government was monitoring Goulart's travel, his business, and his political activities. These files were from 1965, a year after the coup in Brazil, and suggest that he could have been deliberately attacked. The Movement for Justice and Human Rights and the President João Goulart Institute have requested a document referring to the Uruguayan Interior Ministry saying that "serious and responsible Brazilian sources" talked about an "alleged plot against the former Brazilian president".

Tests carried out by forensic experts in Brazil on Goulart's exhumed remains revealed no evidence of poison. The autopsy concluded that his death was likely due to natural causes. Despite the findings from the forensic analysis, Brazil's National Truth Commission is persisting with its investigation into the circumstances surrounding Goulart's demise. Allegations suggested that Goulart's medication for a heart condition had been swapped with poison by Uruguayan secret agents acting on behalf of the Brazilian dictatorship. Goulart's body was exhumed for examination to address suspicions of foul play, within the larger framework of Operation Condor which targeted opposition activists.

=== Chile ===
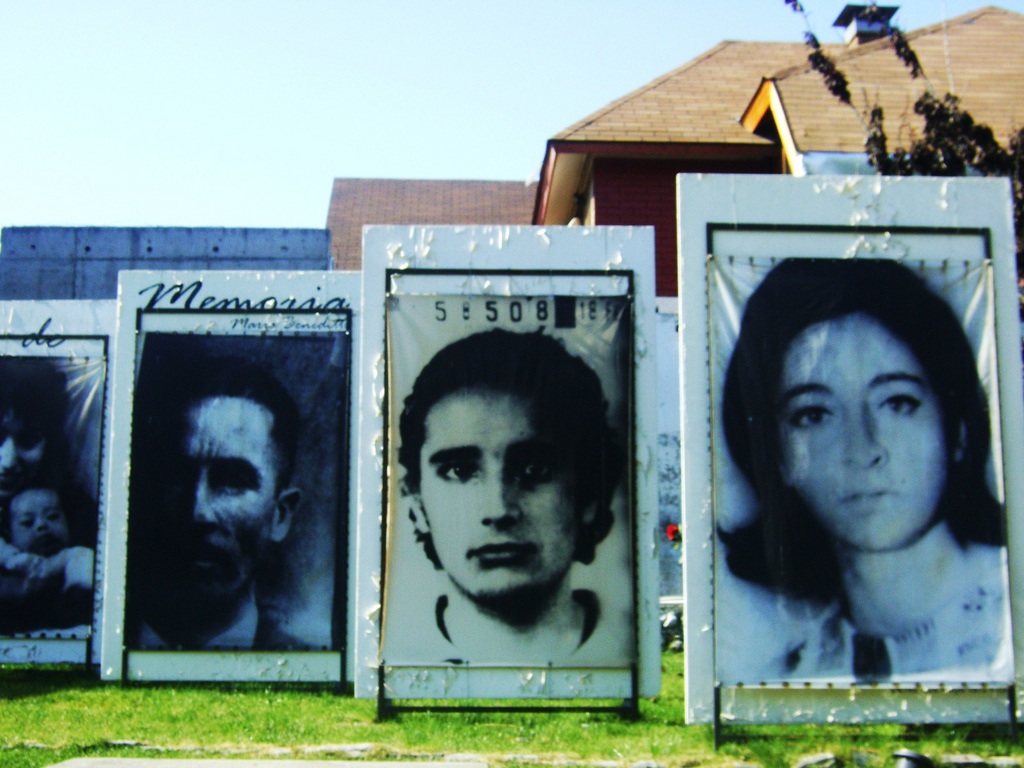
Disappeared people in art at Parque por la Paz at Villa Grimaldi in Santiago de Chile

When Augusto Pinochet was arrested in London in 1998 in response to Spanish magistrate Baltasar Garzón's request for his extradition to Spain, additional information concerning Condor was revealed. One of the lawyers seeking his extradition said there had been an attempt to assassinate Carlos Altamirano, leader of the Chilean Socialist Party. He said that Pinochet met Italian neo-fascist terrorist Stefano Delle Chiaie during Francisco Franco's funeral in Madrid in 1975 and arranged to have Altamirano murdered. The plan failed. Chilean judge Juan Guzmán Tapia eventually established a precedent concerning the crime of "permanent kidnapping": since the bodies of victims kidnapped and presumably murdered could not be found, he deemed that the kidnapping was thought to continue, rather than to have occurred so long ago that the perpetrators were protected by an amnesty decreed in 1978 or by the Chilean statute of limitations. In November 2015, the Chilean government acknowledged that Pablo Neruda might have been murdered by members of Pinochet's regime.

==== General Carlos Prats ====
General Carlos Prats and his wife, Sofía Cuthbert were killed by a car bomb on 30 September 1974, in Buenos Aires, where they lived in exile. The Chilean DINA has been held responsible. In Chile, Judge Alejandro Solís terminated the prosecution of Pinochet in January 2005 after the Chilean Supreme court rejected his demand to revoke Pinochet's immunity from prosecution (as chief of state). The leaders of DINA, including chief Manuel Contreras, ex-chief of operations and retired general Raúl Itturiaga Neuman, his brother Roger Itturiaga, and ex-brigadiers Pedro Espinoza Bravo and José Zara, were charged in Chile with this assassination. DINA agent Enrique Arancibia Clavel has been convicted in Argentina for the murder.

==== Bernardo Leighton ====
Bernardo Leighton and his wife were severely injured by a failed assassination attempt on 6 October 1975, after settling in exile in Italy. The pistol attack left Bernardo Leighton seriously injured and his wife, Anita Fresno, permanently disabled. According to declassified documents in the National Security Archive and Italian attorney general Giovanni Salvi, who led the prosecution of former DINA head Manuel Contreras, Stefano Delle Chiaie met with Michael Townley and Virgilio Paz Romero in Madrid in 1975 to plan the murder of Bernardo Leighton with the help of Francisco Franco's secret police. In 1999, the secretary of the National Security Council (NSC), Glyn T. Davies, declared that the declassified documents established the responsibility of Pinochet government in carrying out the assassination of Bernardo Leighton, as well as Orlando Letelier and General Carlos Prats. a failed assassination attempt on 6 October 1975.

==== Orlando Letelier ====
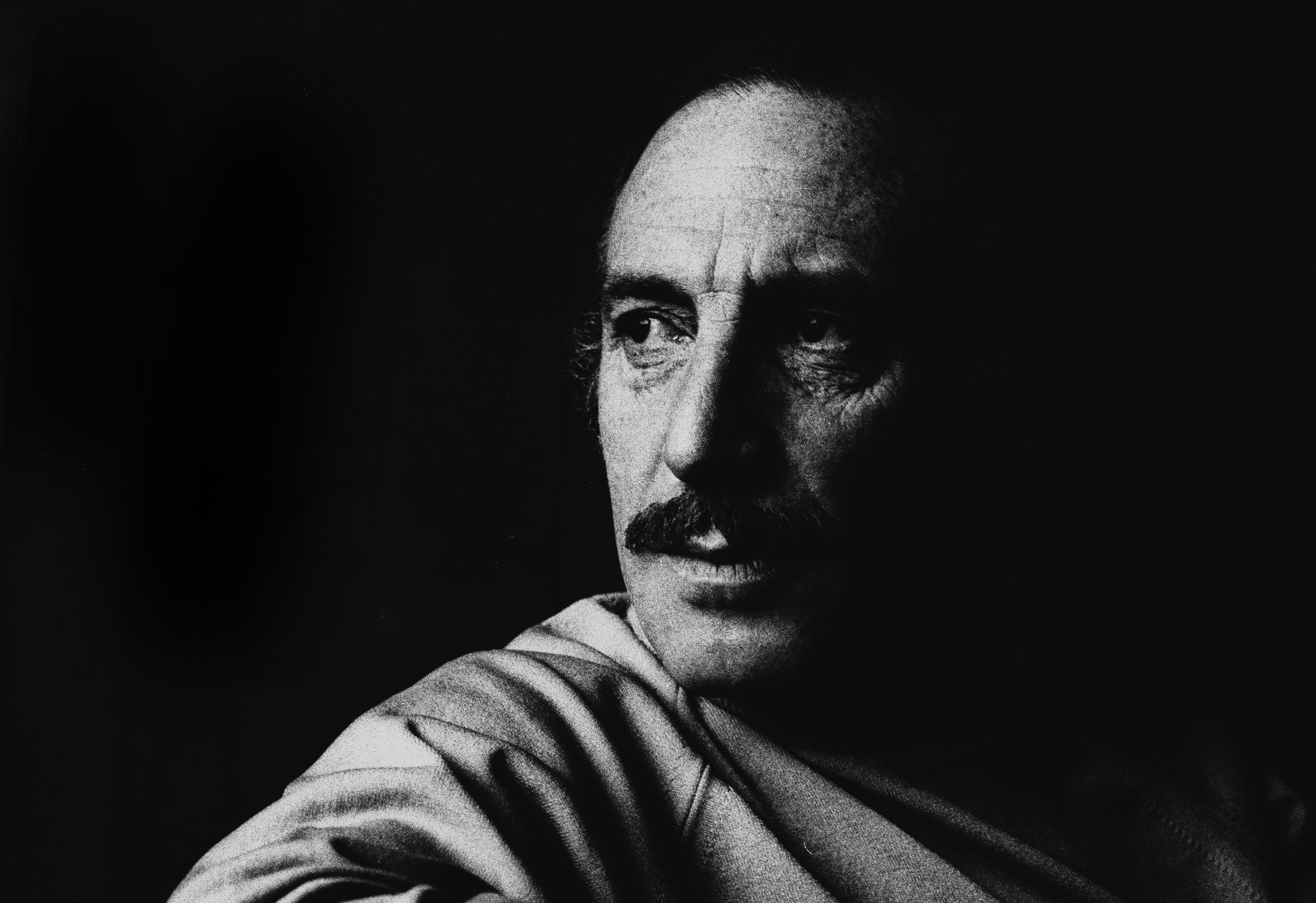
Letelier in 1976

On 21 September 1976, Orlando Letelier, an exiled Chilean diplomat was killed in a car bombing in Washington D.C. Evidence from uncovered documents suggests that his murder was ordered as part of Operation Condor and that the US was not aware of the plot against him.

In December 2004, Francisco Letelier, the son of Orlando Letelier, wrote in an OpEd column in the Los Angeles Times that his father's assassination was part of Operation Condor, which he described as "an intelligence-sharing network used by six South American dictators of that era to eliminate dissidents".

Michael Townley has accused Pinochet of being responsible for Letelier's death. Townley confessed that he had hired five anti-Castro Cuban exiles to booby-trap Letelier's car. According to Jean-Guy Allard, after consultations with the terrorist organization CORU's leadership, including Luis Posada Carriles and Orlando Bosch, those elected to carry out the murder were Cuban-Americans José Dionisio Suárez, Virgilio Paz Romero, Alvin Ross Díaz, and brothers Guillermo and Ignacio Novo Sampoll. According to the Miami Herald, Luis Posada Carriles was at this meeting, which decided on Letelier's death and also the Cubana Flight 455 bombing.

==== Caso Quemados ====
In July 1986, photographer Rodrigo Rojas de Negri was burned alive and Carmen Gloria Quintana suffered serious burns during a street protests against Pinochet. The two's case became known as Caso Quemados ("The Burned Case") and the case received attention in the United States because Rojas had fled to the US after the 1973 coup. A document by the U.S. State Department highlights that the Chilean army deliberately set both Rojas and Quintana on fire. Pinochet, on the other hand, accused both Rojas and Quintana of being terrorists who were set ablaze by their own Molotov cocktails. According to National Security Archive analyst Peter Kornbluh, Pinochet's reaction to the attack and death of Rojas "contributed to Reagan's decision to withdraw support for the regime and press for a return to civilian rule".

==== Operación Silencio ====
Cover of La Segunda, 25 July 1975, in regards to the murder of MIR operatives in Argentina. Main header reads "Exterminated like mice"

Operación Silencio (Operation Silence) was a Chilean operation to impede investigations by Chilean judges by removing witnesses from the country. It started about a year before the "terror archives" were found in Paraguay.

In April 1991, Arturo Sanhueza Ross, linked to the murder of MIR leader Jecar Neghme in 1989, left the country. According to the Rettig Report, Jecar Neghme's death had been carried out by Chilean intelligence agents. In September 1991, Carlos Herrera Jiménez, who killed trade-unionist Tucapel Jiménez, left by plane. In October 1991, Eugenio Berríos, a chemist who had worked with DINA agent Michael Townley, was escorted from Chile to Uruguay by Operation Condor agents to avoid testifying in the Letelier case. He used Argentine, Uruguayan, Paraguayan and Brazilian passports, raising concerns that Operation Condor was not dead. Berríos was found dead in El Pinar, near Montevideo (Uruguay), in 1995. His body had been so mutilated as to make identification by appearance impossible.

In January 2005, Michael Townley, who now lives in the U.S. under the witness protection program, acknowledged links between Chile, DINA, and the detention and torture center Colonia Dignidad. The center was established in 1961 by Paul Schäfer, who was arrested in March 2005 in Buenos Aires and convicted on charges of child rape. Townley informed Interpol about Colonia Dignidad and the Army's Bacteriological Warfare Laboratory. This last laboratory would have replaced the old DINA laboratory on Via Naranja de lo Curro street, where Townley worked with the chemical assassin Eugenio Berríos. The toxin that allegedly killed Christian-Democrat Eduardo Frei Montalva may have been made in this new lab in Colonia Dignidad, according to the judge investigating the case. In 2013, a Brazilian-Uruguayan-Argentine collaborative documentary, Dossiê Jango, implicated the same lab in the alleged poisoning of João Goulart, Brazil's deposed president.

==== U.S. Congressman Edward Koch ====
In February 2004, reporter John Dinges published The Condor Years: How Pinochet and His Allies Brought Terrorism to Three Continents. He revealed that Uruguayan military officials threatened to assassinate U.S. Congressman Edward Koch (later Mayor of New York City) in mid-1976. In late July 1976, the CIA station chief in Montevideo had received information about it. Based on learning that the men were drinking at the time, he recommended that the CIA take no action. The Uruguayan officers included Colonel José Fons, who was at the November 1975 secret meeting in Santiago, Chile; and Major José Nino Gavazzo, who headed a team of intelligence officers working in Argentina in 1976 and was responsible for the death of more than 100 Uruguayans.

Interviewed in the early 21st century by Dinges, Koch said that George H. W. Bush, then CIA director, informed him in October 1976 that "his sponsorship of legislation to cut off U.S. military assistance to Uruguay on human rights grounds had provoked secret police officials to 'put a contract out for you'". In mid-October 1976, Koch wrote to the Justice Department asking for FBI protection, but none was provided. (This was more than two months after the meeting and after Orlando Letelier's murder in Washington.) In late 1976, Colonel Fons and Major Gavazzo were assigned to prominent diplomatic posts in Washington, D.C. The State Department forced the Uruguayan government to withdraw their appointments, with the public explanation that "Fons and Gavazzo could be the objects of unpleasant publicity". Koch learned about the connections between the threats and the post appointments only in 2001.

=== Paraguay ===
The United States backed Alfredo Stroessner's anti-communist military dictatorship and played a "critical supporting role" in the domestic affairs of Stroessner's Paraguay. For instance, when Stroessner established a special branch of the secret police, subordinate to the Ministry of Internal Affairs – the National Directorate of Technical Affairs (Dirección Nacional de Asuntos Técnicos, DNAT), U.S. Army officer Lieutenant Colonel Robert Thierry was sent to help set up the organization and find recruits, ultimately settling on Antonio Campos Alum as head of this organization (nicknamed La Technica) which would carry out disappearances and torture in Paraguay. Another branch, the Department of Investigations of the Metropolitan Police (Departamento de Investigaciones de la Policía de la Capital, DIPC), headed by Pastor Coronel, interrogated their captives in tubs of human vomit and excrement and shocked them in the rectum with electric cattle prods. They dismembered the Communist Party Secretary, Miguel Ángel Soler, alive with a chainsaw while Stroessner listened on the phone. Stroessner demanded the tapes of detainees screaming in pain to be played to their family members.

In a report to Kissinger, Harry Shlaudeman described Paraguay's militaristic state as a "nineteenth-century military regime that looks good on the cartoon page". Shlaudeman's judgments adopted a tone of paternalism, but was correct in noting that Paraguay's "backwardness" was leading it toward the fate of its neighbors. Although the United States viewed conflict from a global and ideological perspective, many decolonized nations defined national security threats in terms of neighboring nations and longstanding ethnic or regional feuds. Shlaudeman notes the incredible resilience that Paraguay showed against the superior military might of its neighbors during the Chaco War. From the perspective of the government in Paraguay, the victory against its neighbors over the course of several decades justified the lack of development in the nation. The report further states that the political traditions in Paraguay were anything but democratic. This reality, combined with a fear of leftist dissent in neighboring nations, led the government to focus on the containment of political opposition instead of on the development of its economic and political institutions. An ideological fear of its neighbors compelled them to protect its sovereignty. Therefore, the fight against radical, leftist movements within and without the country motivated many policymakers to act in the interest of security. In 2020, French writer Pablo Daniel Magee published the book Opération Condor prefaced by Costa Gavras. The book follows the life of Paraguayan victim of the Condor Operation Martín Almada.

=== Peru ===
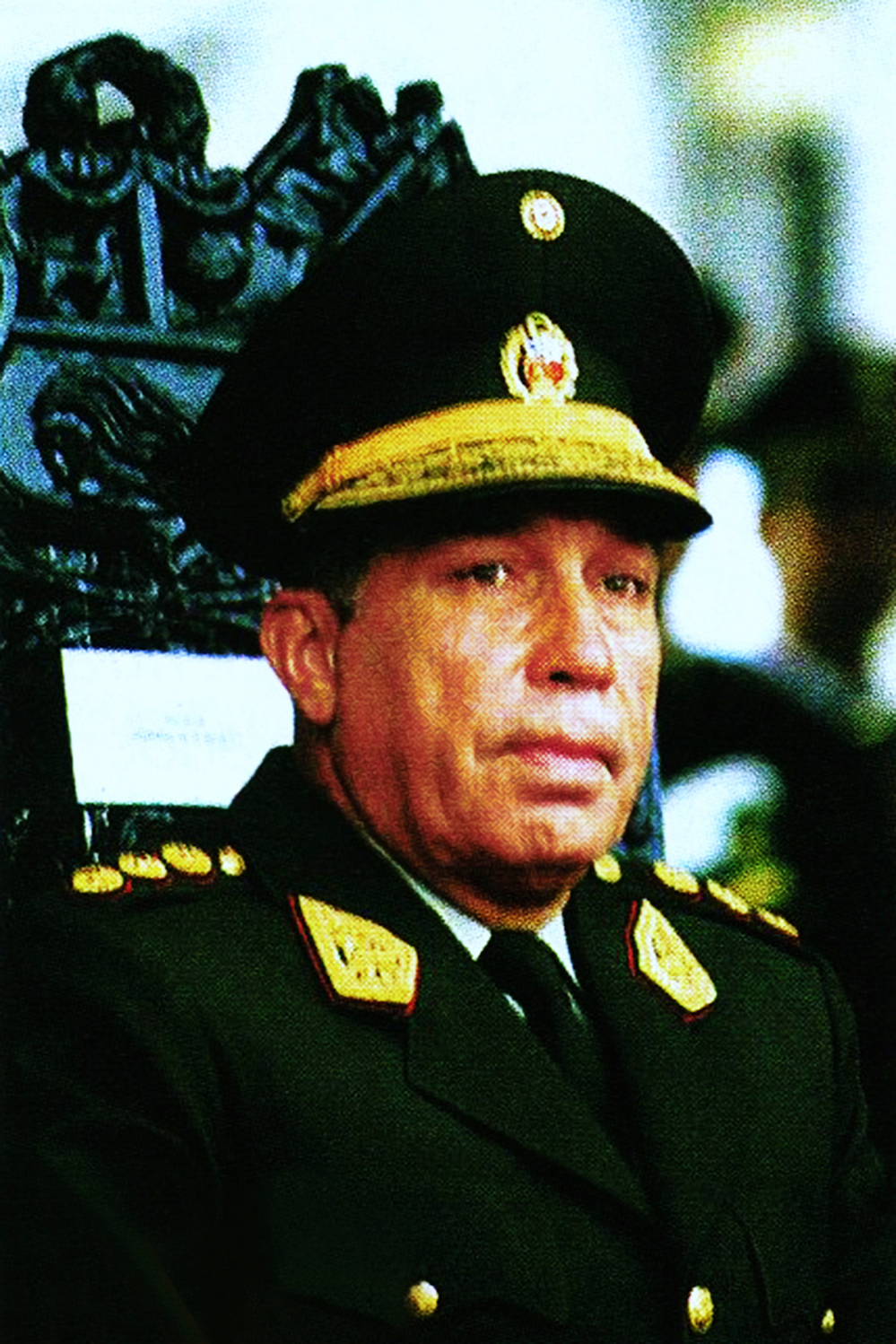
The Peruvian dictator Francisco Morales Bermúdez was part of Operation Condor

The Peruvian legislator Javier Diez Canseco declared that he and twelve colleagues (Justiniano Apaza Ordóñez, Hugo Blanco, Genaro Ledesma Izquieta, Valentín Pacho, Ricardo Letts, César Lévano, Ricardo Napurí, José Luis Alvarado Bravo, Alfonso Baella Tuesta, Guillermo Faura Gaig, José Arce Larco, and Humberto Damonte), all prominent opponents of the dictatorship of Francisco Morales Bermúdez, were kidnapped in Peru, expatriated in 1978 and handed over to the Argentine armed forces in the city of Jujuy. Diez Canseco added that there is declassified documentation of the CIA and cable information which account for the links of the Morales Bermúdez government with Operation Condor.

=== Uruguay ===
As per usual with Southern Cone 1970s dictatorships, Juan María Bordaberry proclaimed himself a dictator and banned the rest of political parties. The de facto government spanned from 1973 to 1985, in which period a considerable number of people were murdered, tortured, illegally detained and imprisoned, kidnapped and forced into disappearance, in the purported defence against subversion. Prior to the 1973 coup d'état, the CIA had acted as a consultant to the law enforcement agencies in the country. Dan Mitrione, the best known example of such cooperation, had trained civilian police in counterinsurgency at the School of the Americas in Panama, known as the Western Hemisphere Institute for Security Cooperation after 2000.

=== Other cases ===
Edgardo Enríquez, Chilean leader of the MIR, "disappeared" in Argentina, as did the MIR leader Jorge Fuentes. Alexei Jaccard and Ricardo Ramírez were "disappeared", and a support network to the Communist party was dismantled in Argentina in 1977. Cases of repression in the country against German, Spanish, Peruvian, and Jewish people were also reported. The assassinations of former Bolivian president Juan José Torres and former Uruguayan deputies Héctor Gutiérrez and Zelmar Michelini in Buenos Aires in 1976 were also part of Condor. The DINA contacted Croatian terrorists (i.e., Ustashe émigrés and descendants), Italian neo-fascists, and the Shah's SAVAK to locate and assassinate dissidents in exile.

According to reports in 2006, resulting from trials of top officials in Argentina, Operation Condor was at its peak in 1976 when Chilean exiles in Argentina were threatened; many went underground or into exile again in other countries. Chilean General Carlos Prats had been assassinated by DINA in Buenos Aires in 1974, with the help of former CIA agent Michael Townley. Cuban diplomats were assassinated in Buenos Aires in the Automotores Orletti torture center, one of the 300 clandestine prisons of the dictatorship. These centers were managed by the Grupo de Tareas 18, headed by former police officer and intelligence agent Aníbal Gordon, earlier convicted of armed robbery, who reported directly to General Commandant of the SIDE, Otto Paladino.

Automotores Orletti was the main base of foreign intelligence services involved in Operation Condor. José Luis Bertazzo, a survivor of kidnapping and torture who was detained there for two months, identified Chilean, Uruguayan, Paraguayan and Bolivian nationals held as prisoners and who were interrogated by agents from their own countries. The 19-year-old daughter-in-law of poet Juan Gelman was tortured here along with her husband, before being transported to a Montevideo prison. There she delivered a baby which was immediately stolen by Uruguayan military officers and placed for illegal adoption with friends of the regime. Decades later, President Jorge Batlle ordered an investigation and finally, Macarena Gelman was found and recovered her identity.

According to Dinges' book Los años del Cóndor (The Years of the Condor), Chilean MIR prisoners in the Orletti center told José Luis Bertazzo that they had seen two Cuban diplomats, 22-year-old Jesús Cejas Arias and 26-year-old Crescencio Galañega, tortured by Gordon's group. They were interrogated by a man who had travelled from Miami to interrogate them. The Cuban nationals had been responsible for protection of Cuban ambassador to Argentina, Emilio Aragonés. They were kidnapped on 9 August 1976, at the corner of calle Arribeños and Virrey del Pino, by 40 armed SIDE agents, who blocked the street with their Ford Falcons. (These were the car models used by the security forces during the dictatorship.)

According to Dinges, the FBI and the CIA were informed of their arrest. He quotes a cable sent from Buenos Aires by FBI agent Robert Scherrer on 22 September 1976, in which he mentioned that Michael Townley, later convicted for the assassination of former Chilean minister Orlando Letelier in Washington, D.C., had taken part in the interrogations of the two Cubans. On 22 December 1999, the former head of the DINA confirmed to Argentine federal judge María Servini de Cubría in Santiago de Chile that Michael Townley and Cuban Guillermo Novo Sampoll were present in the Orletti center. They had travelled from Chile to Argentina on 11 August 1976 and "cooperated in the torture and assassination of the two Cuban diplomats". Luis Posada Carriles, an anti-Castro Cuban terrorist, boasted in his autobiography, Los Caminos Del Guerrero (The Roads of the Warrior), of the murder of the two young men.

=== Prominent victims ===
- Martín Almada, educator in Paraguay, arrested in 1974 and tortured for three years
- Víctor Olea Alegría, member of the Socialist Party, arrested on 11 September 1974 and "disappeared" (Manuel Contreras, head of DINA, was convicted in 2002 for this crime)
- Guillermo Roberto Beausire Alonso (Anglicised as William Beausire), British-Chilean commercial engineer, abducted at Ministro Pistarini International Airport on 2 November 1974. Returned to Chile, Beausire was held in various DINA torture and detention centres before his enforced disappearance on 2 July 1975.
- Volodia Teitelboim, member of the Communist Party of Chile, targeted for murder in Mexico with Carlos Altamirano in Mexico in 1976
- Juan José Torres, former socialist president of Bolivia, was kidnapped and assassinated by right-wing death squads in June 1976.
- "Disappearance" of two Cuban diplomats in Argentina, Crecencio Galañega Hernández and Jesús Cejas Arias, who transited through Orletti detention center in Buenos Aires (9 August 1976 – see Lista de centros clandestinos de detención (Argentina)); both were questioned by the SIDE and the DINA, with the knowledge of the FBI and the CIA
- Andrés Pascal Allende, nephew of Salvador Allende and secretary general of the MIR, escaped an assassination attempt in Costa Rica in March 1976
- Carmelo Soria, Spanish diplomat, civil servant of the CEPAL (a UN organization), assassinated on 21 July 1976
- Jorge Zaffaroni and María Emilia Islas, possible members of the Tupamaros, "disappeared" in Buenos Aires on 29 September 1976, kidnapped by the Batallón de Inteligencia 601, who transferred them to the Uruguayan OCOAS (Organismo Coordinador de Operaciones Anti-Subversivas)
- Dagmar Hagelin, 17-year-old Swedish national kidnapped in 1977 and shot in the back by Alfredo Astiz as she tried to escape; later "disappeared"
- Poet Juan Gelman's son and daughter-in-law – imprisoned; their baby, born in prison, was taken by the Uruguayan military and illegally placed for adoption by a regime ally
- Journalist Vladimir Herzog, Jew-Croatian naturalized Brazilian, accused of being part of the (then clandestine) Communist Party of Brazil by Brazilian military regime, and arrested, tortured and killed on the premises of DOI-CODI in São Paulo

== U.S. involvement ==
Operation Condor also had the covert support of the US government. Washington provided Condor with military intelligence and training, financial assistance, advanced computers, sophisticated tracking technology, and access to the continental telecommunications system housed in the Panama Canal Zone.

— J. Patrice McSherry

The United States documentation shows that the United States provided key organizational, financial and technical assistance to the operation into the 1980s.

In a United States Department of State briefing for Henry Kissinger, then the Secretary of State, dated 3 August 1976 written by Harry Shlaudeman and entitled the "Third World War and South America", the long-term dangers of a right-wing bloc and their initial policy recommendations were considered. The briefing was a summary of Southern Cone security forces. It stated that the operation was an effort of six countries in the southern cone of Latin America (Argentina, Bolivia, Brazil, Chile, Paraguay, and Uruguay) to win the "Third-World-War" by wiping out "subversion" through transnational secret intelligence activities, kidnapping, torture, disappearance and assassination. The report opens by considering the cohesiveness felt by the six nations of the Southern Cone. It was the assumption of the Shlaudeman's briefing that the countries in the Southern Cone perceived themselves as "the last bastion of Christian civilization" and thus they consider the efforts against communism as justified as the "Israeli actions against Palestinian terrorists". Shlaudeman warns Kissinger that in the long term the "Third World War" would put those six countries in an ambiguous position because they are trapped on either side by "international Marxism and its terrorist exponents", and on the other by "the hostility of uncomprehending industrial democracies misled by the Marxist propaganda". The report recommended that U.S. policy towards Operation Condor should emphasize the differences between the five countries at every opportunity, to depoliticize human rights, to oppose rhetorical exaggerations of the "Third-World-War" type, and bring the potential bloc-members back-into our cognitive universe through systematic exchanges. According to the final statement, these suggestions were part of an attempt to convince the nations involved that the Third World War is not desirable.

Based on 1976 CIA documents stated that from 1960 to the early 1970s, the plans were developed among international security officials at the US Army School of the Americas and the Conference of American Armies to deal with political dissidents in South America. A declassified CIA document dated 23 June 1976, explains that "in early 1974, security officials from Argentina, Chile, Uruguay, Paraguay and Bolivia met in Buenos Aires to prepare coordinated actions against subversive targets". US officials were aware of what was going on.

Additionally, as of a September 1976, the Defense Intelligence Agency reported that US intelligence services were quite aware of the infrastructure and goals of Operation Condor. They realized that "Operation Condor" was the code name given for intelligence collection on "leftists", Communists, Peronists or Marxists in the Southern Cone Area. The intelligence services were aware that it was security cooperation among several South American countries' intelligence services (such as Argentina, Paraguay, Uruguay, and Bolivia) with Chile as the epicenter of the operation. The DIA noted that Argentina, Uruguay, and Chile were already fervently conducting operations, mainly in Argentina, against leftist targets. Members of SIDE were also operating with Uruguayan military Intelligence officers in an operation carried out against the Uruguayan terrorist organization, the OPR-33. The report also noted that a large volume of U.S. currency was seized during the combined operation.

The third point of the report demonstrates the United States' understanding of Operation Condor's more nefarious operations. The report notes, "the formation of special teams from member countries who are to carry out operations to include assassinations against terrorist or supporters of terrorist organizations". This report goes more in detail about how operation of the special teams would be carried out. As an example of a special team, the special team organized in Argentina was made up of members of the Argentina Army Intelligence Service and the State Secretariat for Information. The report also highlighted the fact that these special teams were intelligence service agents rather than military personnel, however these teams did operate in structures reminiscent of U.S. special forces teams. Mentioning specifically a medic (doctor) and demolition expert. The State Department briefing for Kissinger mentioned awareness of Operation Condor's plans to conduct possible operations in France and Portugal – a matter that would prove to be extremely controversial later in Condor's history.

The US government sponsored and collaborated with DINA (Directorate of National Intelligence), as well as other intelligence organizations forming the nucleus of Condor. CIA documents show that the agency had close contact with members of the Chilean secret police, DINA, and its chief Manuel Contreras. Contreras was retained as a paid CIA contact until 1977, even as his involvement in the Letelier-Moffit assassination was being revealed.

The Paraguayan Archives include official requests to track suspects to and from the U.S. Embassy, the CIA, and FBI. The CIA provided lists of suspects and other intelligence information to the military states. In 1975 the FBI searched in the US for individuals wanted by DINA.

In a February 1976 telecom from the embassy in Buenos Aires to the State Department, intelligence noted the United States possessed awareness of the coming Argentine coup. The ambassador wrote that the Chief of the North American desk of the Foreign Ministry revealed that he had been asked by the "Military Planning Group" to prepare a report and recommendations for how the "future military government can avoid or minimize the sort of problems the Chilean and Uruguayan governments are having with the US over human rights issue". The Chief also specifically stated that "they" (whether he is referring to the CIA or the future military government in Argentina, or both) will face resistance if they were to begin assassinating and executing individuals. This being true, the ambassador explains the military coup will "intend to carry forward an all-out war on the terrorists and that some executions would therefore probably be necessary". This signals that the US also was aware of the planning of human rights violations before they occurred and did not step in to prevent them, despite being entangled in the region's politics already. The last comment confirms this: "It is encouraging to note that the Argentine military are aware of the problem and are already focusing on ways to avoid letting human rights issues become an irritant in US-Argentine Relations".

Regarding the ongoing human rights abuses by the Argentine junta, Professor Ruth Blakeley writes that Kissinger "explicitly expressed his support for the repression of political opponents". On 5 October 1976 Henry Kissinger met with Argentina's foreign finister and said:

Look, our basic attitude is that we would like you to succeed. I have an old-fashioned view that friends ought to be supported. What is not understood in the United States is that you have a civil war. We read about human rights problems but not the context. The quicker you succeed the better ... The human rights problem is a growing one. Your Ambassador can apprise you. We want a stable situation. We won't cause you unnecessary difficulties. If you can finish before Congress gets back, the better. Whatever freedoms you could restore would help.

— Henry Kissinger, U.S. Secretary of State, 5 October 1976 record of conversation

Ultimately, the démarche was never delivered. Kornbluh and Dinges suggest that the decision not to send Kissinger's order was due to Assistant Secretary Harry Shlaudeman's sending a cable to his deputy in D.C which states "you can simply instruct the Ambassadors to take no further action, noting that there have been no reports in some weeks indicating an intention to activate the Condor scheme". McSherry adds, "According to [U.S. Ambassador to Paraguay Robert] White, instructions from a secretary of state cannot be ignored unless there is a countermanding order received via a secret (CIA) backchannel".

A 1978 cable from the US ambassador to Paraguay, Robert White, to the Secretary of State Cyrus Vance revealed that the South American intelligence chiefs involved in Condor "[kept] in touch with one another through a U.S. communications installation in the Panama Canal Zone which cover[ed] all of Latin America".

General Alejandro Fretes Davalos, the chief of staff of Paraguay's armed forces, informed Ambassador White that this US communications installation in the Panama Canal Zone was "employed to coordinate intelligence information among the southern cone countries". McSherry describes these cables as "another piece of increasingly weighty evidence suggesting that U.S. military and intelligence officials supported and collaborated with Condor as a secret partner or sponsor". An Argentine military source also told a U.S. Embassy contact that the CIA was privy to Condor and had played a key role in setting up computerized links among the intelligence and operations units of the six Condor states.

Patricia M. Derian, the Assistant Secretary of State for Human Rights and Humanitarian Affairs from 1977 to 1981, said of Kissinger's role in giving the green light to the junta's repression: "It sickened me that with an imperial wave of his hand, an American could sentence people to death". During the Carter administration, Kissinger congratulated the Argentine military for "wiping out terrorism", and visited the country as a guest of Jorge Videla during the 1978 World Cup. US diplomats feared that this would hinder the Carter Administration's efforts to end the killings by the Argentine junta.

=== Declassification and reflection ===
In June 1999, by order of President Bill Clinton, the State Department released thousands of declassified documents revealing for the first time that the CIA and the State and Defense Departments were intimately aware of Condor. One DOD intelligence report dated 1 October 1976, noted that Latin American military officers bragged about it to their U.S. counterparts. The same report described Condor's "joint counterinsurgency operations" that aimed to "eliminate Marxist terrorist activities"; Argentina, it noted, created a special Condor team "structured much like a U.S. Special Forces Team". A summary of material declassified in 2004 stated that:

The declassified record shows that Secretary of State Henry Kissinger was briefed on Condor and its "murder operations" on 5 August 1976, in a 14-page report from [Harry] Shlaudeman [Assistant Secretary of State]. "Internationally, the Latin generals look like our guys", Shlaudeman cautioned. "We are especially identified with Chile. It cannot do us any good." Shlaudeman and his two deputies, William Luers and Hewson Ryan, recommended action. Over the course of three weeks, they drafted a cautiously worded demarche, approved by Kissinger, in which he instructed the U.S. ambassadors in the Southern Cone countries to meet with the respective heads of state about Condor. He instructed them to express "our deep concern" about "rumors" of "plans for the assassination of subversives, politicians and prominent figures both within the national borders of certain Southern Cone countries and abroad."

— 5 August 1976 briefing of Henry Kissinger by Harry Shlaudeman, State, National Security Archive

Kornbluh and Dinges conclude that "The paper trail is clear: the State Department and the CIA had enough intelligence to take concrete steps to thwart the Condor assassination planning. Those steps were initiated but never implemented". Shlaudeman's deputy Hewson Ryan later acknowledged in an oral history interview that the State Department was "remiss" in its handling of the case. "We knew fairly early on that the governments of the Southern Cone countries were planning, or at least talking about, some assassinations abroad in the summer of 1976. ... Whether if we had gone in, we might have prevented this, I don't know", he stated in reference to the Letelier-Moffitt bombing. "But we didn't".

Other declassified documents further demonstrate the level of knowledge the CIA and State Department had about Condor. In a comprehensive intelligence report from 1 October 1976, the Department of Defense Intelligence stated which Southern Cone countries were participating in the operation, noting that Argentina, Uruguay, and Chile were the most "enthusiastic" about providing intelligence. The document also detailed a joint operation between Uruguayan intelligence agents and Argentine State Secretariat members that targeted a section of the Uruguayan group, OPR-33, in Argentina. The prospect of the operation Condor having the possibility to result in assassinations is noted as well, showing that the U.S. aware of this outcome.

A CIA document described Condor as "a counter-terrorism organization" and noted that the Condor countries had a specialized telecommunications system called "CONDORTEL". A 1978 cable from the US ambassador to Paraguay, Robert White, to the Secretary of State Cyrus Vance, was published on 6 March 2001 by The New York Times. The document was released in November 2000 by the Clinton administration under the Chile Declassification Project. White reported a conversation with General Alejandro Fretes Davalos, chief of staff of Paraguay's armed forces, who informed him that the South American intelligence chiefs involved in Condor "[kept] in touch with one another through a U.S. communications installation in the Panama Canal Zone which cover[ed] all of Latin America".

Davalos reportedly said that the installation was "employed to co-ordinate intelligence information among the southern cone countries". The US feared that the connection to Condor might be publicly revealed at a time when the assassination in the U.S. of Chilean former minister Orlando Letelier and his American assistant Ronni Moffitt was being investigated. White cabled Vance that "it would seem advisable to review this arrangement to insure that its continuation is in US interest". McSherry describes such cables as "another piece of increasingly weighty evidence suggesting that U.S. military and intelligence officials supported and collaborated with Condor as a secret partner or sponsor". In addition, an Argentine military source told a U.S. Embassy contact that the CIA was privy to Condor and had played a key role in setting up computerized links among the intelligence and operations units of the six Condor states.

=== Role of Henry Kissinger ===
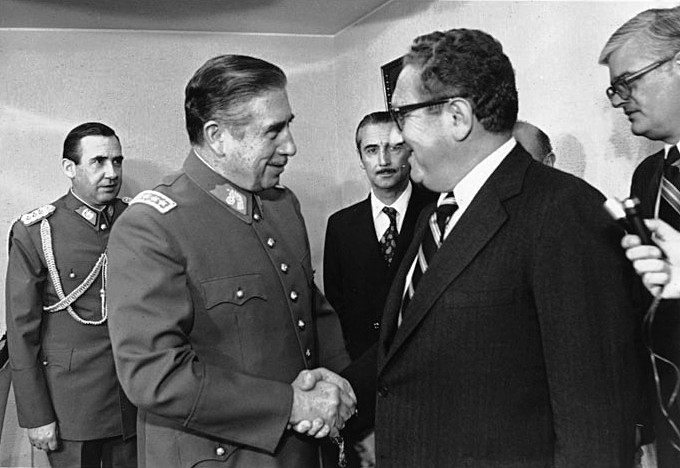
Chilean dictator Augusto Pinochet shaking hands with Henry Kissinger in 1976

Henry Kissinger, Secretary of State in the Nixon and Ford administrations, was well aware of the Condor plan and was closely involved diplomatically with the Southern Cone governments. He was Jorge Videla's personal guest to the 1978 World Cup in Argentina, after his tenure as Secretary of State concluded. According to the French newspaper L'Humanité, the first cooperation agreements were signed between the CIA and anti-Castro groups, and the right-wing death squad Triple A, set up in Argentina by Juan and Isabel Perón's "personal secretary" José López Rega, and Rodolfo Almirón (arrested in Spain in 2006).

Henry Kissinger, the Secretary of State at the time, was deeply involved in Operation Condor plans. He was well aware of the movement to illegally remove or assassinate leftist and assumed communists, to push forward a dictatorship. CIA documents declassified in 2023 reveal Kissinger's involvement with Chilean dictator Augusto Pinochet. On 8 June 1976, Kissinger met privately with Pinochet. Their conversation was documented. Prior to this meeting, Kissinger had been briefed about the ongoing crisis of human rights violations under Pinochet's rule in Chile, as well as the observations of Chile as a tyrannical state. Kissinger claimed to be 'sympathetic' to what they were doing in Chile. He argued that the Chilean government was fighting the Communists and the propaganda of the communist media. While recognizing the human rights issues that needed to be addressed to avoid legislative restrictions, Kissinger assured Pinochet that they were on the same team, "you are a victim of all left-wing groups around the world and that your greatest sin was that you overthrew a government which was going communist". Kissinger recognized that the US could not openly assist a human rights violation, but would not undermine Pinochet.

In New York on 7 October 1976, Henry Kissinger met with the Argentine foreign minister, Cesar Guzetti. They discussed the current regime and the eradication of the left. Kissinger was not against the oppressive regime. The declassified document shows the willingness of Kissinger to assist Guzetti and the Argentine dictatorship removing leftists. When referring to the humanitarian crisis, Kissinger acknowledges the 'civil war' and the humanitarian issues within Argentina, while expressing to Guzetti that the government needs to move fast in the removal of supposed communists, "the quicker you succeed the better".

On 31 May 2001, French judge Roger Le Loire requested that a summons be served on Kissinger while he was staying at the Hôtel Ritz in Paris. Le Loire wanted to question the statesman as a witness regarding alleged U.S. involvement in Operation Condor and for possible US knowledge concerning the "disappearances" of five French nationals in Chile during military rule. Kissinger left Paris that evening, and Loire's inquiries were directed to the U.S. State Department.

In July 2001, the Chilean high court granted investigating judge Juan Guzmán the right to question Kissinger about the 1973 killing of American journalist Charles Horman. His execution by the Chilean military after the coup was dramatized in the 1982 Costa-Gavras film Missing. The judge's questions were relayed to Kissinger via diplomatic routes but were not answered.

In August 2001, Argentine Judge Rodolfo Canicoba sent a letter rogatory to the US State Department, in accordance with the Mutual Legal Assistance Treaty (MLAT), requesting a deposition by Kissinger to aid the judge's investigation of Operation Condor. In 2002, the editors of The New York Times defended Henry Kissinger, arguing that he should be given a pass for his role in Condor and other dirty works because "the world was polarised, and fighting communism involved hard choices and messy compromises".

On 16 February 2007, a request for the extradition of Kissinger was filed at the Supreme Court of Uruguay on behalf of Bernardo Arnone, a political activist who was kidnapped, tortured and disappeared by the dictatorial regime in 1976.

It was discovered in 2010 that Kissinger canceled a warning against the international assassination of political opponents that was to be issued to some of the countries participating in Operation Condor.

== "French connection" ==
French journalist Marie-Monique Robin found in the archives of the Quai d'Orsay, the French Ministry of Foreign Affairs, the original document proving that a 1959 agreement between Paris and Buenos Aires set up a "permanent French military mission" of officers to Argentina who had fought in the Algerian War. It was located in the offices of the chief of staff of the Argentine Army. It continued until François Mitterrand was elected President of France in 1981.

In 1957, Argentine officers, among them Alcides Lopez Aufranc, went to Paris to attend two-year courses at the École de Guerre military school, two years before the Cuban Revolution, and before the rise of anti-government guerrilla movements in Argentina. "In practice", said Robin to Página/12, "the arrival of the French in Argentina led to a massive extension of intelligence services and of the use of torture as the primary weapon of anti-subversive war in the concept of modern warfare". The "annihilation decrees" signed by Isabel Perón were inspired by earlier French documents.

During the Battle of Algiers, police forces were put under the authority of the French Army, and in particular of the paratroopers. They systematically used torture during interrogations and also began to "disappear" suspects, as part of a program of intimidation. Reynaldo Bignone, named President of the Argentine junta in July 1982, said, "The March 1976 order of battle is a copy of the Algerian battle".

On 10 September 2003, French Green Party deputies Noël Mamère, Martine Billard and Yves Cochet petitioned for a Parliamentary Commission to be established to examine the "role of France in the support of military regimes in Latin America from 1973 to 1984" before the Foreign Affairs Commission of the National Assembly, presided by Édouard Balladur. The only newspaper to report this was Le Monde. Deputy Roland Blum, in charge of the commission, refused to allow Marie-Monique Robin to testify. The government's report in December 2003 was described by Robin as being in the utmost bad faith. It claimed that no agreement had ever been signed on this issue between France and Argentina.

When French Minister of Foreign Affairs Dominique de Villepin traveled to Chile in February 2004, he claimed that there had been no cooperation between France and the military regimes.

Reporter Marie-Monique Robin said to L'Humanité newspaper: "The French have systematized a military technique in the urban environment which would be copied and passed to Latin American dictatorships". The methods employed during the 1957 Battle of Algiers were systematized and exported to the War School in Buenos Aires. Roger Trinquier's famous book on counter-insurgency had a very strong influence in South America. Robin said that she was shocked to learn that the French intelligence agency Direction de surveillance du territoire (DST) communicated to the DINA the names of refugees who returned to Chile (Operation Retorno), all of whom were killed. "Of course, this puts the French government in the dock, and Giscard d'Estaing, then President of the Republic. I was very shocked by the duplicity of the French diplomatic position which, at the same time received political refugees with open arms, and collaborated with the dictatorships".

Marie-Monique Robin also showed ties between the French far right and Argentina since the 1930s, in particular through the Roman Catholic fundamentalist organization Cité catholique created by Jean Ousset, a former secretary of Charles Maurras (founder of the royalist Action Française movement). La Cité published a review, Le Verbe, which influenced military officers during the Algerian War, notably by justifying their use of torture. At the end of the 1950s, the Cité catholique established groups in Argentina and set up cells in the Army. It was greatly expanded during the government of General Juan Carlos Onganía, in particular in 1969.

The key figure of the Cité catholique was priest Georges Grasset, who became Videla's personal confessor. He had been the spiritual guide of the Organisation armée secrète (OAS), a pro-French Algeria terrorist movement founded in Francoist Spain. Robin says that this Catholic fundamentalist current in the Argentine Army contributed to the importance and duration of Franco-Argentine cooperation. In Buenos Aires, Georges Grasset maintained links with Archbishop Marcel Lefebvre, founder of the Society of St. Pius X in 1970. He was excommunicated in 1988. The Society of Pius-X has four monasteries in Argentina, the largest in La Reja. A French priest there said to Marie-Monique Robin: "to save the soul of a Communist priest, one must kill him". Luis Roldan, former Under Secretary of Religion under Carlos Menem (President of Argentina from 1989 to 1999), was presented to her by Dominique Lagneau, the priest in charge of the monastery, and described as "Mr. Cité catholique in Argentina". Bruno Genta and Juan Carlos Goyeneche represent this ideology.

Argentine Admiral Luis María Mendía, who had theorized the practice of "death flights", testified in January 2007 before Argentine judges that a French intelligence "agent", Bertrand de Perseval, had participated in the abduction of two French nuns, Léonie Duquet and Alice Domon, who were later murdered. Perseval, who lives today in Thailand, denied any links with the abduction. He has admitted being a former member of the OAS, and having escaped for Argentina after the March 1962 Évian Accords that ended the Algerian War (1954–62). Referring to Marie Monique Robin's film documentary titled The Death Squads – the French School (Les escadrons de la mort – l'école française), Luis María Mendía asked of the Argentine Court that former French president Valéry Giscard d'Estaing, former French premier Pierre Messmer, former French ambassador to Buenos Aires François de la Gorce, and all officials in place in the French embassy in Buenos Aires between 1976 and 1983 be called before the court.

Besides this "French connection", he has also accused former head of state Isabel Perón and former ministers Carlos Ruckauf and Antonio Cafiero, who had signed the "anti-subversion decrees" before Videla's 1976 coup d'état. According to ESMA survivor Graciela Daleo, this tactic tries to claim that the crimes were legitimised by Isabel Perón's "anti-subversion decrees". She notes that torture is forbidden by the Argentine Constitution. Alfredo Astiz, a marine known as the "Blond Angel of Death" because of his torture, also referred to the "French connection" at his trial.

== Europe ==
As showed in a declassified CIA document, in 1977 intelligence agencies from Britain, France and West Germany looked into using the tactics employed in Operation Condor against leftwing "subversives" in their own countries. The agencies sent representatives to the Condor organization secretariat in Buenos Aires in September 1977 to discuss how to establish an "anti-subversion organization similar to Condor", where the agencies would pool their resources into a single organization. The intention was for the agencies to act in a coordinated fashion against subversives within member countries in Europe.

== Legal actions ==
=== Italy ===
In December 2000, the Italian Justice began the trial of eleven Brazilians, all military and police. They were accused of the disappearance of three Argentines of Italian descent. The Brazilians were active in Operation Condor. Due to the secrecy of justice, the results of the trials and the punishments of the criminals, if any, were not reported. In December 2007, they were enacted by Italian authorities, preventive arrests of several people involved, including the deceased João Figueiredo (former president) and Octávio Aguiar de Medeiros (former head of the SNI).

In July 2019, in a landmark ruling, the Italian courts sentenced former Peruvian dictator Morales Bermudez to life imprisonment, together with former Prime Minister Pedro Richter Prada and General Germán Ruíz Figueroa, for the disappearance of Italian citizens.

=== Argentina ===
In Argentina, the CONADEP human rights commission of 1983, led by writer Ernesto Sabato and René Favaloro among other respected personalities, investigated human rights abuses during the dictatorship. The 1985 Trial of the Juntas convicted top officers who ran the military governments for acts of state terrorism. The amnesty laws (Ley de Obediencia Debida and Ley de Punto Final) of 1985–1986 stopped the trials until 2003, when the Congress repealed them, and in 2005 the Argentine Supreme Court ruled they were unconstitutional.

Chilean Enrique Arancibia Clavel was convicted and sentenced in Argentina for the assassination of Carlos Prats and of his wife; in a 2011 court verdict, life terms were handed down to Alfredo Astiz, Jorge Acosta, Antonio Pernias, and Ricardo Cavallo. In 2016, Reynaldo Bignone, Santiago Riveros and twelve others were convicted.

Most of the Junta's members are in prison for genocide and crimes against humanity.

Former military officers from Argentina and Uruguay went on trial in 2013 in Buenos Aires for their human rights abuses in Operation Condor. The cross-border conspiracy of dictatorships in the 1970s and 1980s to "eradicate 'subversion,' a word which increasingly translated into non-violent dissent from the left and center left". These prosecutions were enabled by massive releases of formerly classified documents to the national Security Archive which were then used as evidence against the accused. "The documents are very useful in establishing a comprehensive analytical framework of what Operation Condor was", said Pablo Enrique Ouvina, the lead prosecutor in the case. Of the 171 Condor victims cited in the indictments, approximately forty-two survived and one hundred twenty others were killed and/or disappeared. "Condor was a latter day rendition, torture and assassination program", noted Carlos Osorio, who directs the Archive's Southern Cone Documentation project. "Holding these officials accountable for the multinational crimes of Condor", he said, "cannot help but set a precedent for more recent abuses of a similar nature".

The victims of Operation Condor included former Bolivian president Juan Torres, who was murdered in Buenos Aires in 1976.

=== Chile ===
Chilean judge Juan Guzmán—who arraigned Pinochet upon his return to Chile after being arrested in London—started prosecution of some 30 torturers, including ex-DINA head Manuel Contreras, for the disappearance of 20 Chilean victims of the Condor plan.

On 3 August 2007, General Raúl Iturriaga, another former head of DINA, was captured in the Chilean city of Viña del Mar on the Pacific coast. He had previously been a fugitive from a five-year jail term, after being sentenced for the kidnapping of Luis Dagoberto San Martin, a 21-year-old opponent of Pinochet. Martín was captured in 1974 and taken to a DINA detention center, from which he "disappeared". Iturriaga was also wanted in Argentina for the assassination of General Prats.

According to French newspaper L'Humanité:

in most of those countries legal action against the authors of crimes of "lese-humanity" from the 1970s to 1990 owes more to flaws in the amnesty laws than to a real will of the governments in power, which, on the contrary, wave the flag of "national reconciliation". It is sad to say that two of the pillars of the Condor Operation, Alfredo Stroessner and Augusto Pinochet, never paid for their crimes and died without ever answering charges about the "disappeared" – who continue to haunt the memory of people who had been crushed by fascist brutality.

Among the Chilean victims of Operation Condor were former Chilean ambassador Orlando Letelier and his 26-year-old American colleague Ronni Moffitt who were assassinated by a car bomb in downtown Washington D.C. in 1976.

=== Uruguay ===
Former Uruguayan president Juan María Bordaberry, his minister of Foreign Affairs and six military officers, responsible for the disappearance in Argentina in 1976 of opponents to the Uruguayan regime, were arrested in 2006 and placed under house arrest in 2007. In 2010, Bordaberry was convicted of violating the constitution, nine counts of "forced disappearance" and two counts of political homicide and sentenced to 30 years. In 2016, ex-Uruguayan Colonel Manuel Cordero was convicted in the lengthy Buenos Aires trial (he was the only non-Argentine defendant) and sentenced to 25 years.

Prominent Uruguayan victims of Operation Condor included two former legislators.

== Legacy ==
The political scientist J. Patrice McSherry has argued that parts of Operation Condor fit the definition of state terrorism.

=== Fictional references ===
- Don Winslow's 2005 book The Power of the Dog is based on the actions and some of the consequences of Operation Condor.
- Nathan Englander's novel, The Ministry of Special Cases (2007), is set in Buenos Aires in the early 1970s. Its main characters are Kaddish and Lillian, a Jewish couple whose son Pato is "disappeared" shortly after the Videla junta takes power.
- Memorias de un desaparecido / Memoirs of a Disappeared (1996)
- In DC Comics, the father of the superheroine Fire was a key figure in Operation Condor.
- In the criminal series Numb3rs episode "Assassin", Operation Condor becomes a main point of focus.
- Colm Tóibín's novel, The Story of the Night (1996) follows a gay Argentine man's account of aiding the CIA's political influence shortly after the fall of the military junta government.

== See also ==
- Dirty War (Argentina)
- Dirty War (Mexico)
- Military dictatorship in Brazil
- Operation Charly
- Operation Gladio
- Central American crisis
- Anti-communist mass killings
- United States atrocity crimes
- United States and state terrorism
- U.S. role in Guatemalan Civil War
- U.S. support of Contras
- U.S. role in Indonesian Communist Purge
- U.S. role in Invasion of East Timor
- 1981 Spanish coup d'état attempt
- 1982 Spanish coup d'état attempt
- The War on Democracy (documentary)
- Domino theory
- Monroe Doctrine
- Safari Club
- Alianza Anticomunista Argentina (aka Triple A)
- SISMI (Italian secret services)
- National Security Archives, a United States NGO which publicizes CIA documents obtained under Freedom of Information Act
- Forgotten
- Santiago Riveros
- Antonio Pernías
- Right-wing dictatorship
- The Secret in Their Eyes, 2009 Argentinian movie on the rape and murder of Liliana Colotto de Morales in the Argentinian military regime, 2009 Academy Award for Best International Feature Film's winner
- I'm Still Here, 2024 Brazilian movie on the arrest, torture and disappearance of the deputy Rubens Paiva in the Brazilian military regime, 2024 Academy Award for Best International Feature Film's winner

=== Detention and torture centers ===
- Esmeralda (BE-43)
- Estadio Nacional de Chile
- Villa Baviera

=== Other operations and strategies related to Condor ===
- Operation Colombo, for which Augusto Pinochet was being tried at the time of his death
- Caravan of Death, carried on a few weeks after the 1973 coup in Chile

== Bibliography ==
- Bevins, Vincent (2020). The Jakarta Method: Washington's Anticommunist Crusade and the Mass Murder Program that Shaped Our World. PublicAffairs. ISBN 978-1541742406.
- Blakeley, Ruth (2009). State Terrorism and Neoliberalism: The North in the South. Routledge. ISBN 0415686172. Archived.
- Stella Calloni (2006). Los años del lobo (The Years of the Wolf) and Operación Cóndor: Pacto Criminal (Operation Condor: Criminal Pact). La Habana: Editorial Ciencias Sociales.
- Luiz Cláudio Cunha (2008). Operação Condor. O sequestro dos uruuguaios. Uma reportagem dos tempos da ditadura. Porto Alegre: L±.
- John Dinges (2004). The Condor Years: How Pinochet and His Allies Brought Terrorism to Three Continents. The New Press. ISBN 1565849779.
- Gutiérrez Contreras, J.C. y Villegas Díaz, Myrna (1999). Derechos Humanos y Desaparecidos en Dictaduras Militares (Human Rights and the Disappeared of the Military Dictatorships). KO'AGA ROÑE'ETA, se.vii. Previamente publicado en Derecho penal: Implicaciones Internacionales, Publicación del IX Congreso Universitario de Derecho Penal, Universidad de Salamanca. Edit. Colex, Madrid. Archived.
- Peter Kornbluh (2007). "Rendition in the Southern Cone: Operation Condor Documents Revealed From Paraguayan 'Archive of Terror'." The National Security Archive.
- Peter Kornbluh (2013). The Pinochet File: A Declassified Dossier on Atrocity and Accountability. The New Press. ISBN 1595589120.
- McSherry, J. Patrice (2005). Predatory States: Operation Condor and Covert War in Latin America. Lanham, Maryland: Rowman & Littlefield. ISBN 978-0742536876.
- McSherry, J. Patrice (2010). "Industrial Repression' and Operation Condor in Latin America". In Esparza, Marcia; Huttenbach, Henry R.; Feierstein, Daniel (eds.). State Violence and Genocide in Latin America: The Cold War Years. Critical Terrorism Studies. Abingdon-on-Thames, Oxfordshire, England: Routledge. ISBN 978-0415496377. Archived from the original on 19 July 2018.
- Cecilia Menjívar and Néstor Rodríguez, eds. (2005). When States Kill: Latin America, the U.S., and Technologies of Terror. University of Texas Press. ISBN 0292706790. Archived.
- Nilson, Cezar Mariano (1998). Operación Cóndor. Terrorismo de Estado en el cono Sur (Operation Condor in the Southern Cone). Buenos Aires: Lholé-Lumen.
- Paredes, Alejandro (2004). La Operación Cóndor y la guerra fría (Operation Condor and the Cold War). Universum [online], vol. 19, no. 1, pp. 122–137. ISSN 0718-2376. Archived.
- Marie-Monique Robin (2002). Escadrons de la mort, l'école française (Death Squads, the French School). Book and documentary film (French, transl. in Spanish). Sudamericana.
- Informe de la Comisión Nacional sobre prisión política y tortura (Report of the National Commission on Political Imprisonment and Torture). (2005). Santiago de Chile, Ministerio del Interior. Comisión Nacional sobre Prisión Política y Tortura. PDF.
