= American terrorism =

American terrorism may refer to:

- United States and state-sponsored terrorism, terrorism allegedly sponsored by the US government
- United States and state terrorism, terrorism allegedly conducted by the US government
- Domestic terrorism in the United States, terrorism allegedly carried out in the US by American citizens
- Terrorism in the United States, terrorism alleged to have occurred within the borders of the US

== See also ==
- List of designated terrorist groups
