= Detenidos Desaparecidos =

Victims of kidnapping by Latin American military dictatorships

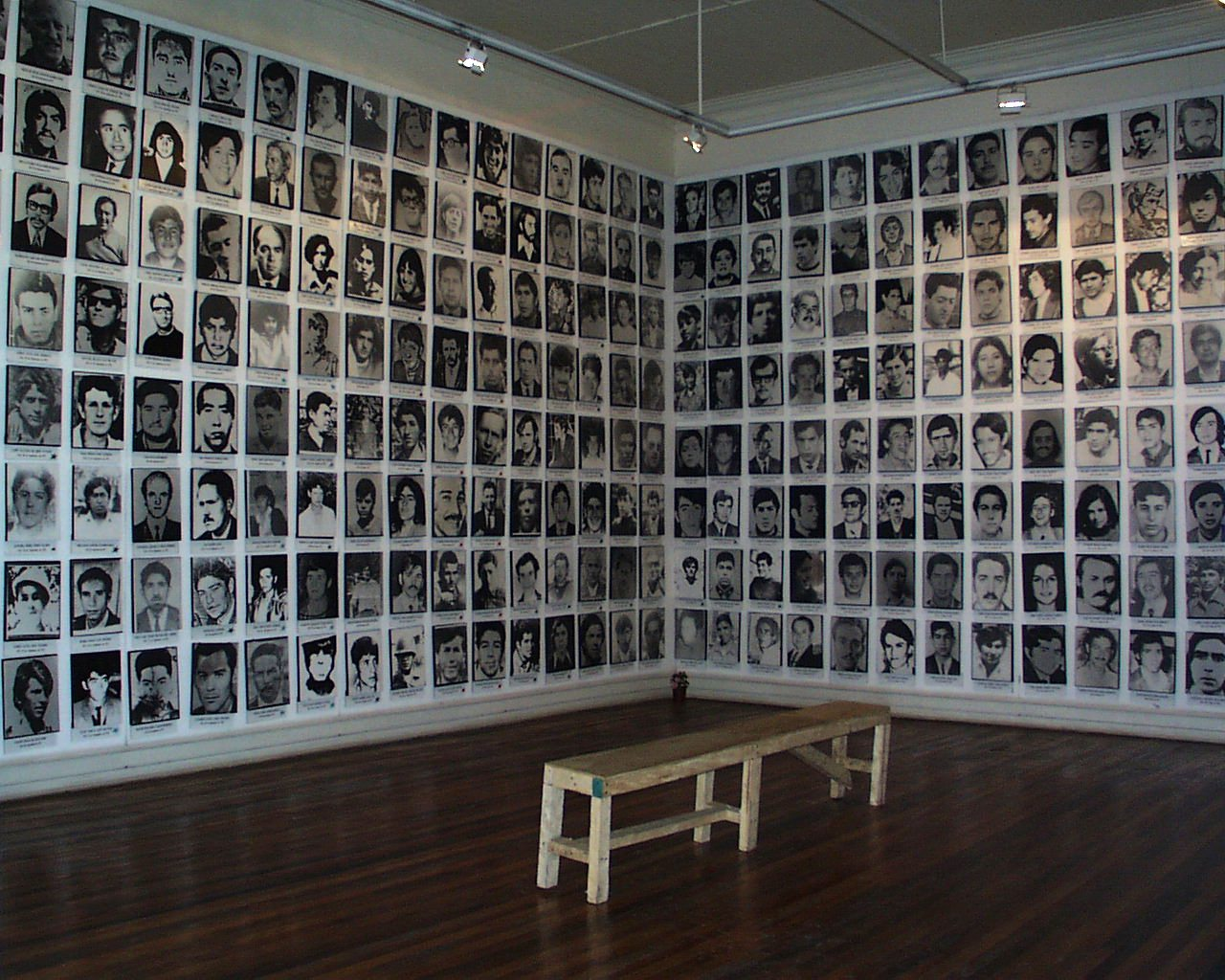
Photographs of people who disappeared after the coup d'état of September 11, 1973 in Chile.

Disappeared Detainees (Spanish: detenidos desaparecidos, DD. DD) is the term commonly used in Latin American countries to refer to the victims of kidnappings, usually taken to clandestine detention and torture centers, and crimes of forced disappearance, committed by various authoritarian military dictatorships during the 1970s and 1980s, and officially recognized, among others, by the governments of Argentina (1984) and Chile (1991).

== Origin ==
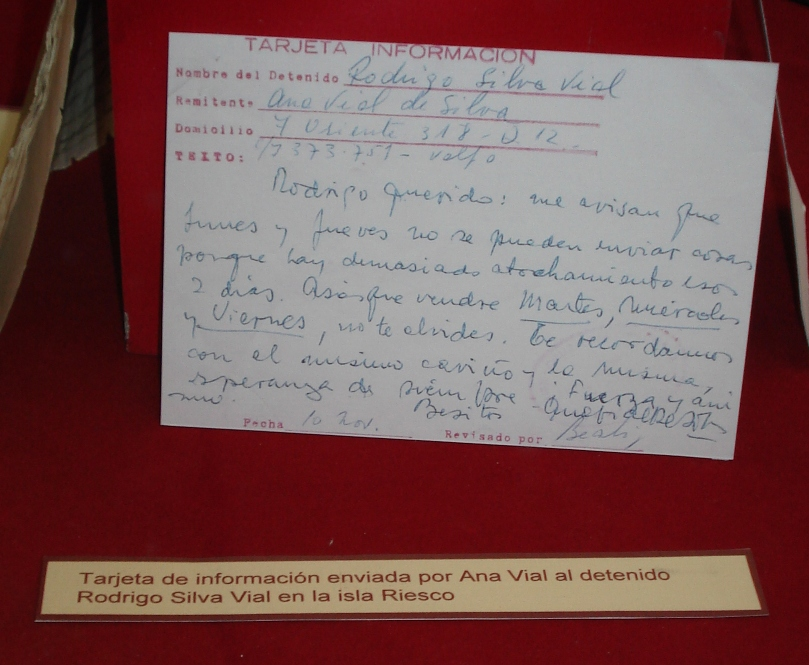
Information card of a Chilean detainee who disappeared during the military dictatorship of Augusto Pinochet Ugarte.

The simultaneous and massive appearance of this practice in various countries is considered to be the result of the common training provided to Latin American military personnel by the U.S. Defense Department at its School of the Americas in Panama. Antecedents of these forced eliminations and disappearances of political prisoners occurred in Nazi Germany, such as the Nacht und Nebel Decree, issued by Hitler in 1941, in which it was ordered that political activists or those assisting the resistance were to be summarily executed without any record of their capture and execution.

== Procedures ==
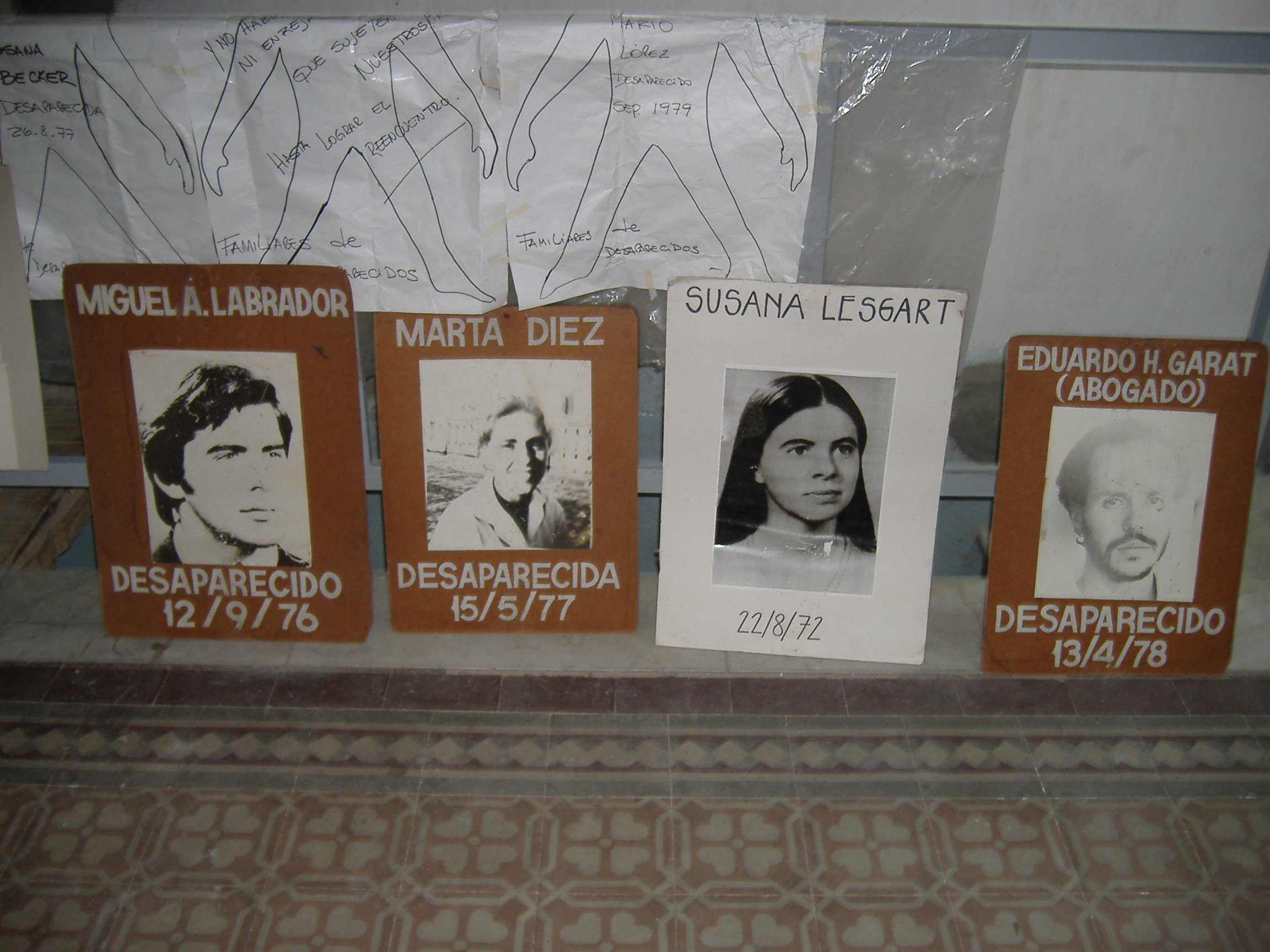
Photographs of disappeared detainees in a former illegal detention center in Rosario, Argentina.

The first step of this method consisted in the apprehension of the victims by law enforcement agencies, undercover secret police, or paramilitary groups with official support. Sometimes the arrest was conducted with a certain formality; at other times it took on the appearance and brutality of a kidnapping.

Once arrested, the victim was usually subjected to physical and psychological torture sessions, while official channels of information denied relatives any knowledge of the person's whereabouts. The "detainees" pointed the finger at complete strangers for protecting their companions. They hoped that the interrogators would quickly determine their innocence, although often the opposite was true: the detainees could not provide them with any information because they had no information to offer, which led to even greater torture." Finally, the prisoner was killed, and his body was buried clandestinely. Some 12,000 of the hostages survived and are considered "ex-disappeared detainees."

The hiding of the corpse was often carried out with the support of aerial vehicles, such as airplanes and helicopters, from which the bodies were thrown into the sea or into inaccessible areas.

== Consequences ==
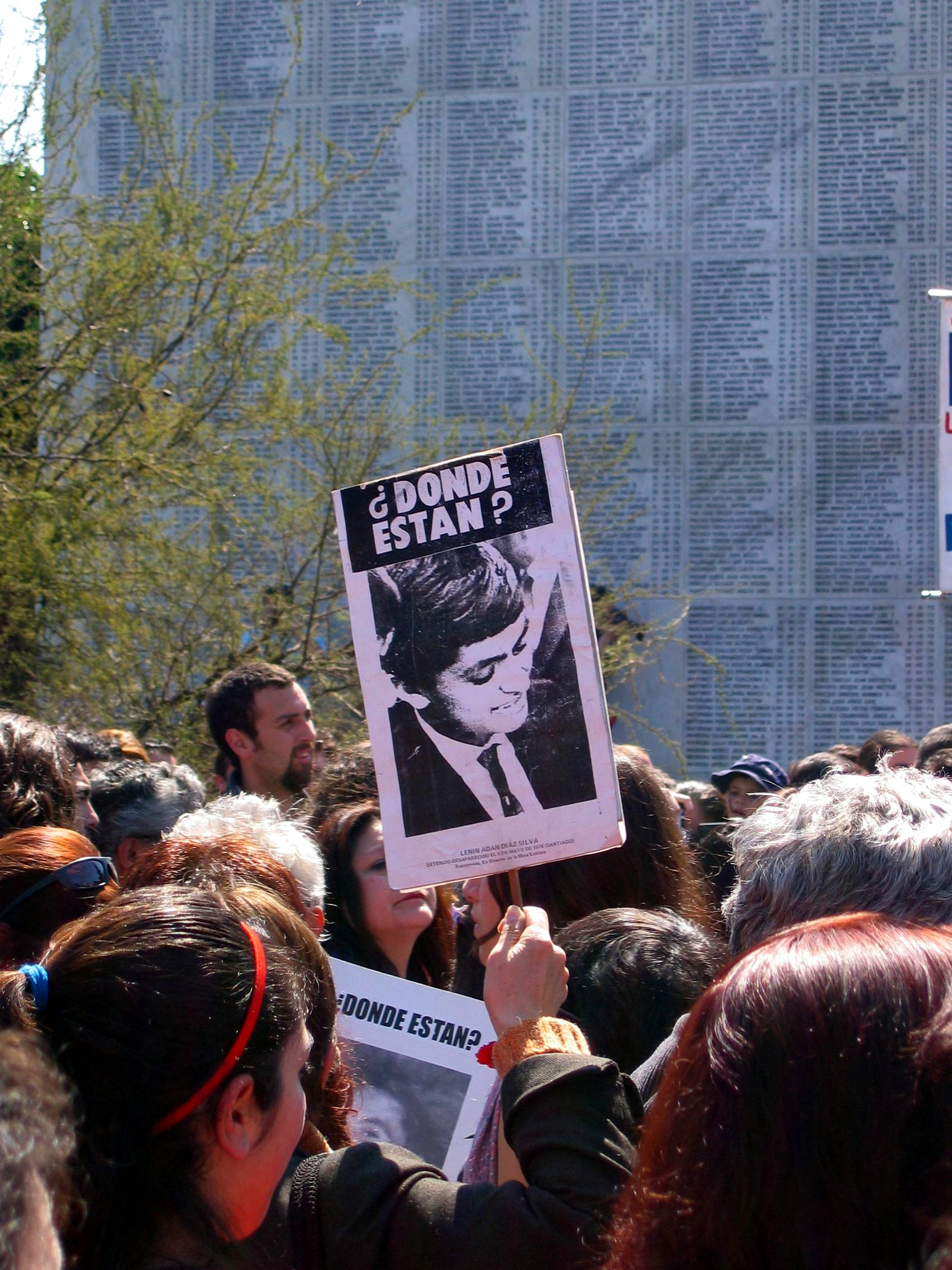
Commemoration of the disappeared in Chile on 11 September 2004, in front of the monument to the disappeared in the General Cemetery.

The massive disappearance of people implied long years of search and suffering for their relatives (causing severe anguish due to long unfinished mourning). This situation led relatives to organize themselves to demand information, justice, and the search for the corpses by filing habeas corpus petitions in the courts. For example, in Chile, the Association of Families of the Detained-Disappeared and the Agrupación de Familiares de Ejecutados Políticos acted; and in Argentina, the organization of Mothers of Plaza de Mayo and the Mothers of Plaza de Mayo (founder organisation).

This illegal practice was forced, with the passage of time and the fall of the dictatorships that carried it out, the creation of official bodies to clarify these crimes (such as the National Commission on the Disappearance of Persons in Argentina or the Commission for Peace in Uruguay), and the creation of a new criminal offense in many of the countries affected, where today the forced disappearance of persons is explicitly punished, in addition to international human rights treaties and conventions.

== See also ==
- Civic-military dictatorship of Uruguay
- Disappeared Detainees of the Dirty War
- Clandestine detention center (Argentina)
- Colombian conflict
- Dictatorship of Alfredo Stroessner
- Enforced disappearances in Chile
- Internal conflict in Peru
- Military dictatorship in Brazil
- Operation Condor
