= United States and state terrorism =

Terrorism allegations against the U.S.

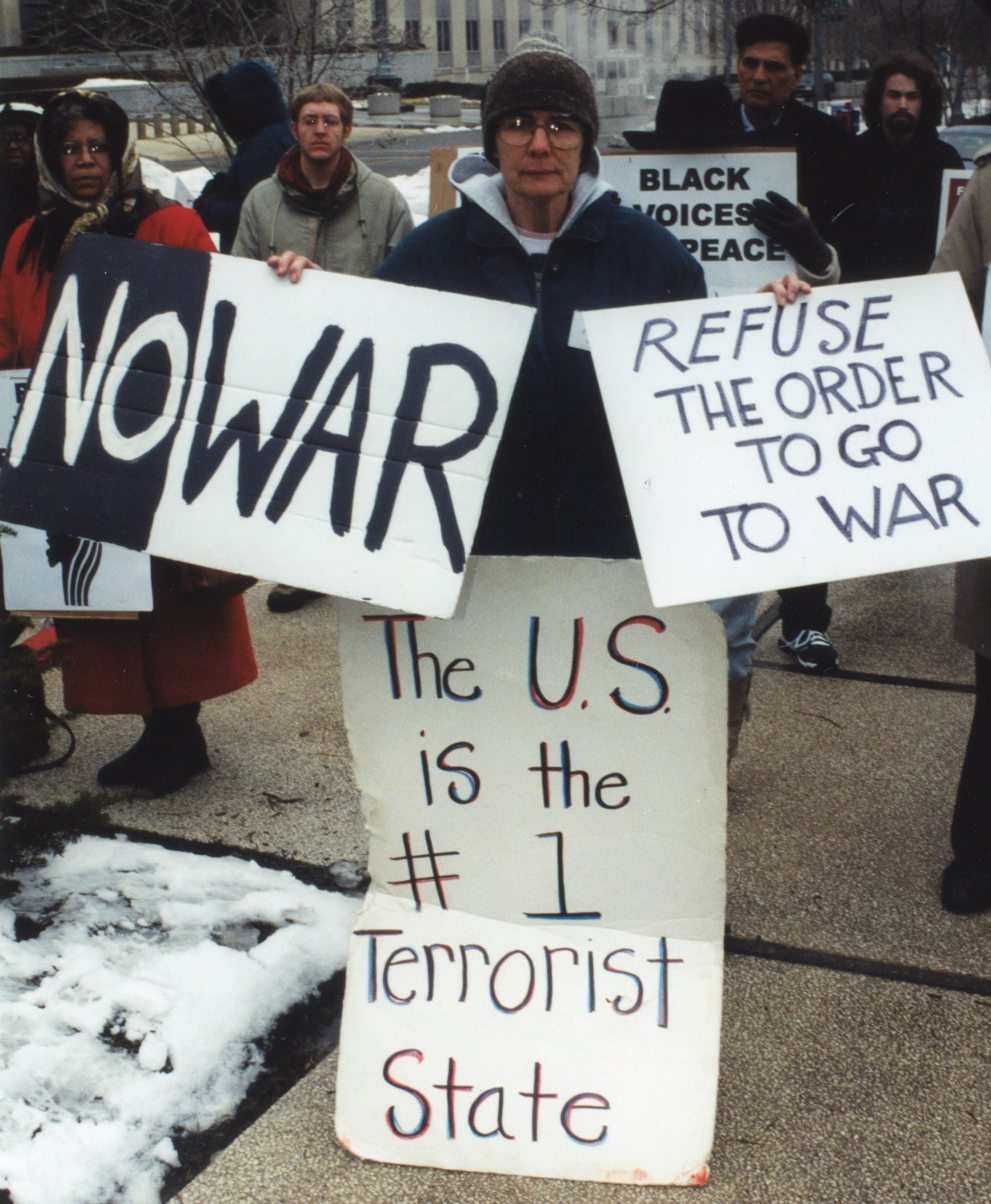
Protester with a sign reading "The U.S. is the #1 Terrorist State" at a demonstration against the Iraq War in 2003.

Several scholars have accused the United States of involvement in state terrorism. They have written about the US and other liberal democracies' use of state terrorism, particularly in relation to the Cold War. According to them, state terrorism is used to protect the interest of capitalist elites, and the U.S. organized a neo-colonial system of client states, co-operating with regional elites to rule through terror.

Such works include Noam Chomsky and Edward S. Herman's The Political Economy of Human Rights (1979), Herman's The Real Terror Network (1985), Alexander L. George's Western State Terrorism (1991), Frederick Gareau's State Terrorism and the United States (2004), and Doug Stokes' America's Other War (2005). Of these, Professor Ruth J. Blakeley considers Chomsky and Herman as being the foremost writers on the United States and state terrorism.

This work has proved controversial with mainstream scholars of terrorism, who concentrate on non-state terrorism and the state terrorism of dictatorships.

== Notable works ==
Beginning in the late 1970s, Noam Chomsky and Edward S. Herman wrote a series of books on the United States' involvement with state terrorism. Their writings coincided with reports by Amnesty International and other human rights organizations of a 'new global epidemic of state torture and murder'. Chomsky and Herman argued that terror was concentrated in the U.S. sphere of influence in developing countries, and documented human rights abuses carried out by U.S. client states in Latin America. They argued that of ten Latin American countries that had death squads, all were US client states. Worldwide they claimed that 74% of regimes that used torture on an administrative basis were U.S. client states, receiving military and other support from the U.S. to retain power. They concluded that the global rise in state terror was a result of U.S. foreign policy.

Chomsky concluded that all powers backed state terrorism in client states. At the top were the U.S. and other powers, notably the United Kingdom and France, that provided financial, military, and diplomatic support to Third World regimes kept in power through violence. These governments acted together with multinational corporations, particularly in the arms and security industries. In addition, other developing countries outside the Western sphere of influence carried out state terror supported by rival powers.

The alleged involvement of major powers in state terrorism in developing countries has led scholars to study it as a global phenomenon rather than study individual countries in isolation.

In 1991, a book edited by Alexander L. George also argued that other Western powers sponsored terror in developing countries. It concluded that the U.S. and its allies were the main supporters of terrorism throughout the world. Gareau states that the number of deaths caused by non-state terrorism (3,668 deaths between 1968 and 1980, as estimated by the Central Intelligence Agency (CIA)) is "dwarfed" by those resulting from state terrorism in US-backed regimes such as Guatemala (150,000 killed, 50,000 missing during the Guatemalan Civil War – 93% of whom Gareau classifies as "victims of state terrorism").

Among other scholars, Ruth J. Blakeley says that the United States and its allies sponsored and deployed state terrorism on an "enormous scale" during the Cold War. The justification given for this was to contain Communism, but Blakeley contends it was also a means by which to buttress the interests of U.S. business elites and to promote the expansion of neoliberalism throughout the Global South. Mark Aarons posits that right-wing authoritarian regimes and dictatorships backed by Western powers committed atrocities and mass killings that rival the Communist world, citing examples such as the Indonesian occupation of East Timor, the Indonesian mass killings of 1965–66, the "disappearances" in Guatemala during the civil war, and the assassinations and state terrorism associated with Operation Condor throughout South America. In Worse Than War, Daniel Goldhagen argues that during the last two decades of the Cold War, the number of American client states practicing mass murder outnumbered those of the Soviet Union. According to Latin Americanist John Henry Coatsworth, the number of repression victims in Latin America alone far surpassed that of the U.S.S.R. and its East European satellites between 1960 and 1990. J. Patrice McSherry asserts that "hundreds of thousands of Latin Americans were tortured, abducted or killed by right-wing military regimes as part of the US-led anti-communist crusade."

=== 2026 ===
During the second presidency of Donald Trump, media sources, politicians, and others have described US Immigration and Customs Enforcement (ICE) activities, particularly during Operation Metro Surge (which included the killing of two civilian protesters) as "terror".

In February 2026, in a court case on the immigration policy of the second Trump administration, Judge Sunshine Sykes wrote "Beyond its terror against noncitizens, the executive branch has extended its violence on its own citizens".

== Definition ==
The United States legal definition of terrorism excludes acts done by recognized states. According to U.S. law (22 U.S.C. 2656f(d)(2)) terrorism is defined as "premeditated, politically motivated violence perpetrated against noncombatant targets by subnational groups or clandestine agents, usually intended to influence an audience". There is no international consensus on a legal or academic definition of terrorism. United Nations conventions have failed to reach consensus on definitions of non-state or state terrorism.

According to professor Mark Selden, "American politicians and most social scientists definitionally exclude actions and policies of the United States and its allies" as terrorism. Historian Henry Commager wrote that "Even when definitions of terrorism allow for state terrorism, state actions in this area tend to be seen through the prism of war or national self-defense, not terror." According to Dr Myra Williamson, the meaning of "terrorism" has undergone a transformation. During the reign of terror a regime or system of terrorism was used as an instrument of governance, wielded by a recently established revolutionary state against the enemies of the people. Now the term "terrorism" is commonly used to describe terrorist acts committed by non-state or subnational entities against a state.

In State terrorism and the United States Frederick F. Gareau writes that the intent of terrorism is to intimidate or coerce both targeted groups and larger sectors of society that share or could be led to share the values of targeted groups by causing them "intense fear, anxiety, apprehension, panic, dread and/or horror". The objective of terrorism against the state is to force governments to change their policies, to overthrow governments or even to destroy the state. The objective of state terrorism is to eliminate people who are considered to be actual or potential enemies, and to discourage those actual or potential enemies who are not eliminated.

== General critiques ==
The classification of United States foreign policy as "state terrorism" is a subject of intense academic and political debate, centering on the definition of terrorism and the extent of US responsibility for the actions of its allies. William Odom, formerly the director of the National Security Agency under President Reagan's administration, argued that because terrorism is a tactic rather than a specific enemy, the United States' history of supporting such tactics makes its modern rhetoric appear hypocritical. This sentiment is shared by professor Richard Falk, who asserts that the term "terrorism" should be applied neutrally to any deliberate targeting of civilians, whether by state or non-state actors. Falk suggests that focusing solely on non-state groups is an insufficient strategy for peace and has even argued that those resisting US policy might invoke a Nuremberg Defense. However, critics like Daniel Schorr argue that Falk's definitions are inherently subjective, leading to inconsistent labels of what acts are "permissible."

Further criticism of the "state terror" label comes from political scientist James S. Fishkin, who, in reviewing the work of Noam Chomsky and Edward S. Herman, argues that they overstate American omnipotence. Fishkin contends that while the US may provide "systematic support" to brutal regimes, it lacks the direct "control" once exercised by the Soviet Union over Eastern Europe. He suggests the moral charge against the US should be a failure to use its influence to prevent atrocities, rather than being the primary architect of them. Similarly, former US Secretary of Education William Bennett and Stephen Morris have dismissed the "terrorist state" label as preposterous, pointing to US interventions in Kuwait, Bosnia, the Balkans, and Somalia as evidence of a liberating foreign policy. Morris specifically argued that most brutal 20th-century regimes operated independently of American aid.

Despite these defenses, the debate often centers on the 1965–66 Indonesian mass killings. While earlier scholars like Morris claimed limited US involvement, 2017 declassified documents from the U.S. Embassy in Jakarta confirmed the government was deeply involved in the campaign. Historians such as Vijay Prashad and Brad Simpson note that the US provided lists of targets and encouraged the military to carry out the massacres to ensure the ouster of Sukarno and the rise of neoliberal policies. This led to a 2016 ruling by an international tribunal in The Hague, which found the US and other Western governments complicit in crimes against humanity. Journalist Vincent Bevins characterizes these events not as an aberration, but as the peak of a broader network of US-backed anti-communist mass killings across the Global South during the Cold War.

== See also ==
- Debate over the atomic bombings of Hiroshima and Nagasaki
- Perceptions of the United States sanctions
- Targeted killings by the United States government
- United States and state-sponsored terrorism
- United States atrocity crimes
- Imperial boomerang
- Political violence in the United States
- Human rights in the United States
- United States and the International Criminal Court
- United States war crimes
