= Enforced disappearances in Chile =

Disappeared detainees in Chile (Desaparecidos), refers to the victims of enforced disappearances perpetrated by the Chilean military during the political repression following the 1973 coup d'état led by Augusto Pinochet. The term "disappeared detainees" is also used in other Latin American countries. These enforced disappearances were used both to eliminate oppositional individuals and to "spread terror within society". According to the intergovernmental organization International Criminal Court (ICC), “enforced disappearance of persons constitutes a crime against humanity".

== History ==
The crimes of forced disappearance in Chile, were committed by various military formations of the Chilean Armed Forces and the Carabineers during the 1970s and 1980s –particularly the Dirección de Inteligencia Nacional (DINA). The problem was officially recognized first in 1990.

== Post-dictatorship investigations ==
In 1990, when democracy returned in Chile, the authorities established the National Truth and Reconciliation Commission, which documented over 3,200 victims –including dead and missing, left behind by the dictatorship. In 1991 the commission delivered the Rettig Report, which acknowledged "more than 3,200 victims, including dead and missing, left behind by the dictatorship".

In 2023, the government of Gabriel Boric recognized the disappearance of 1469 persons, of whom only the fate of 307 has been so far established. The government issued a plan to investigate the whereabouts of the rest of the 1,162 disappeared victims.

Together with reports from Amnesty International, the London-based human rights investigation group Memoria Viva maintains a regularly updating with lists of disappeared detainees in Chile.
