= J. Patrice McSherry =

American political scientist

Joan Patrice McSherry is a professor of political science at Long Island University. She specializes in the study of Latin American politics and she wrote the book Predatory States, which detailed the United States involvement in the Operation Condor. McSherry is founding chair and Director of the Latin American and Caribbean Studies Program at the LIU campus. She won LIU's David Newton Award for Excellence in Teaching in 2008 and received the Distinguished Alumni Award from the Political Science MA-Ph.D Program of the CUNY Graduate Center in 2009. She has been awarded several Fulbright grants (Argentina, 1992; Uruguay, 2005; Chile, 2011), and has authored several books and coedited another. She serves on the editorial board of the journal Social Justice. She was Associate Editor for Latin America for Journal of Third World Studies for thirteen years (1997–2010). McSherry worked with several international non-governmental organizations on human rights issues before graduate school.

== Works ==
=== Books ===
- Predatory States: Operation Condor and Covert War in Latin America. Rowman & Littlefield (2005). ISBN 978-0742536869.
