= John Dinges =

American journalist (born 1941)

- Born: December 8, 1941 (age 84); Iowa, U.S.
- Education: Stanford University
- Occupations: Journalist and author
- Spouse: Carolina Kenrick
- Children: 3
- Writing career
- Genre: Non-fiction
- Subject: Foreign policy

John Dinges (December 8, 1941) is an American journalist. He was special correspondent for Time, Washington Post and ABC Radio in Chile. With a group of Chilean journalists, he cofounded the Chilean magazine APSI. He is the Godfrey Lowell Cabot Professor of International Journalism at Columbia University Graduate School of Journalism, a position he held from 1996 to 2016, currently with emeritus status.

== Early life and career ==
John Dinges was born in Iowa. His first job in journalism was at the Des Moines Register and Tribune, followed by a decades long career as a freelance journalist in Latin America, foreign desk assistant editor at The Washington Post, and managing editor at NPR.

Dinges earned a bachelor's degree in English and Philosophy from Loras College, and a master's degree in Latin American studies from Stanford University. He studied theology at the University of Innsbruck in Austria for three years, with the intention of becoming a Catholic priest, before switching to journalism.

He worked on the foreign desk of The Washington Post, traveling as a reporter to cover the civil wars in El Salvador, Guatemala and Nicaragua. From 1972 to 1978 Dinges lived in Chile, "one of the few American journalists to live in Chile during its most violent period of military rule". He helped create three Chilean media organizations. The first, APSI/Actualidad Internacional, was founded in 1976, under intense military censorship, and became one of the leading investigative news magazines exposing the abuses of the military.

In 2008 after six-months as a Fulbright visiting professor at Universidad Alberto Hurtado, he created the investigative journalism center, Centro de Investigación e Información Periodística (CIPER), in association with Monica González, a prominent investigative reporter.

In collaboration with investigative journalists Jorge Escalante, Pascale Bonnefoy, María Olivia Mönckeberg and Maria Jose Vilches, he created ArchivosChile, which carried out groundbreaking investigations exploring the secret documentary record of the military government. ArchivosChile was based for several years in the University of Chile's communications school, ICEI.

He is executive director and board chair of the U.S.-based Center for Investigation and Information (CIINFO) of Washington DC. CIINFO was the non-profit fundraising vehicle for ArchivosChile and CIPER, as well as a series of investigative journalism projects, most recently on Operation Condor and military dictatorships in South America.

From 1985 to 1996 he worked at National Public Radio as managing editor, acting senior foreign editor and editorial director.

From 1996 to 2016 he was the Godfrey Lowell Cabot Professor of International Journalism at Columbia University Graduate School of Journalism, currently emeritus.

In April 2015, John Dinges provided extensive testimony as a witness for Prosecutor Pablo Ouviña during the "Plan Condor" trial in Buenos Aires, Argentina. As an expert on Operation Condor, Dinges is the most frequently cited expert witness in the prosecutor's case due to his significant contributions to the investigation across multiple countries including Chile, Paraguay, Argentina, Uruguay, Bolivia, Brazil, and the United States. His contributions include authoring two notable books - "Assassination on Embassy Row" and "The Condor Years" - conducting interviews with over a dozen police, military agents, and victims, and gathering crucial data from intelligence archives in the region. In May 2016, the verdict of the tribunal, the "Tribunal Oral Federal N°1", declared 15 convictions directly related to the forced disappearance of 106 victims.

== Personal life ==
Dinges married Carolina Kenrick. They have 3 children. Tomas was born in Santiago in 1977 and lives and works in Chile. Sebastián and Camila were born in Washington DC.

== Books ==
- Assassination on Embassy Row (Pantheon 1980), with Saul Landau, on Orlando Letelier's murder; finalist for the Edgar Allan Poe Award 1981 for "Best Fact Crime."
- Our Man in Panama (Random House 1990); book on Manuel Noriega .
- The Condor Years: How Pinochet and his Allies Brought Terrorism to Three Continents, The New Press 2003, about Operation Condor.
- Sound Reporting: The NPR Guide to Radio Reporting and Production (editor).
- Independence and Integrity (editor).
- Chile in Their Hearts: The Untold Story of Two Americans Who Went Missing after the Coup. University of California Press. 2025. ISBN 978-0-520-41320-7.

== Awards ==
- Maria Moors Cabot Prize for excellence in Latin American reporting
- Latin American Studies Media Award
- two Alfred I. Dupont-Columbia University Awards (as NPR Managing Editor)

He serves on the advisory boards of Human Rights Watch and the National Security Archive, and is a juror for the Maria Moors Cabot Prizes and the du-Pont Columbia awards.
