= Marhaenism =

Indonesian left-wing political ideology

Marhaenism (Indonesian: Marhaenisme [marhaenˈɪsmə]) is a socialistic political ideology originated and developed by the first President of Indonesia, Sukarno. It was developed from the ideas of Marxism applied according to the nature and culture of Indonesia, or simply described as "Marxism adapted to Indonesian conditions".

Marhaenism is a variant of Marxism but emphasizes national unity, culture, collectivist economics, and democratic rights and condemns liberalism and individualism. It was established as an anticapitalist and anti-imperialist ideology. Marhaenism was the guiding ideology of the Indonesian National Party. It also was a major influence on left-wing nationalism taking hold in neighbouring Malaya, such as the espousals of Parti Kebangsaan Melayu Malaya and later Parti Rakyat — both founded by Ahmad Boestamam.

== Etymology ==
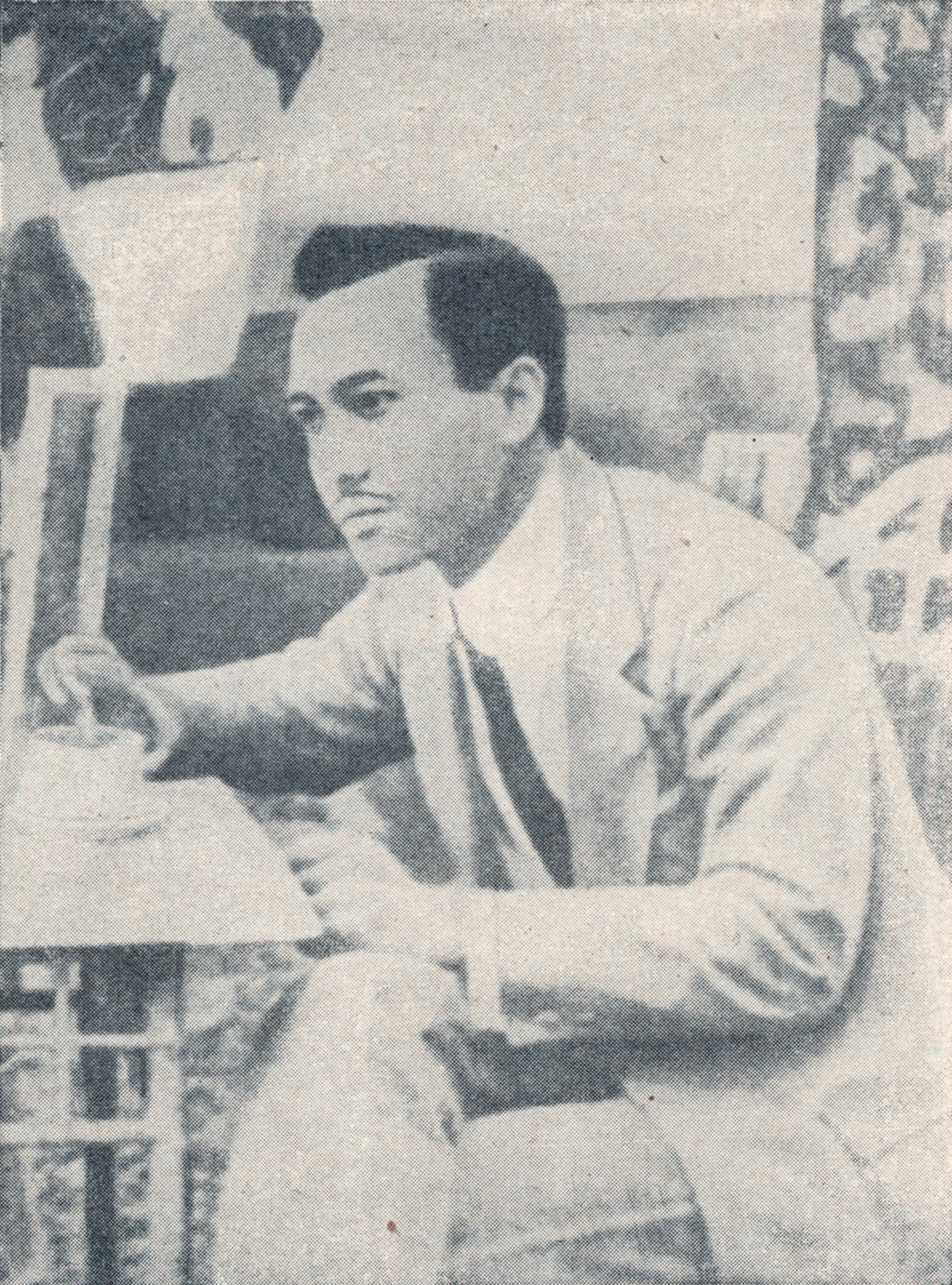
Sukarno as university student in Bandung

The name of the ideology was alleged to be from the name of a peasant whom Sukarno claimed he met near Bandung. However, Sukarno's claim was a hoax. "Marhaen" had been used by Sarekat Islam to describe ordinary people long before Sukarno went to Bandung. Sukarno took to referring to members of the agrarian class as "Marhaens" beginning with his Indonesia Accuses (Indonesia Menggugat) speech in 1930, to replace the term proletariat which he considered largely irrelevant to Indonesia. Defining "proletariat" as members of the working class not owning their own labour power, Sukarno pointed out that many Indonesian farmers owned their labour power and used it primarily for themselves, in spite of their poverty. To Sukarno, the means of production in Indonesia were so small that they are only sufficient to sustain life of the individual; to raise social, political, or economic status. Thus the expression "marhaen" extended the meaning aimed at all the small groups of people that are meant to be farmers and laborers (proletarians) whose lives are always in the grip of the rich and rulers/bourgeois/capitalists.

In 1966, an opinion emerged stating that Marhaen was an abbreviation of Marx, Hegel, Engels. According to politician Nazaruddin Sjamsuddin, the first time this opinion emerged was triggered by an editorial in the Angkatan Bersenjata newspaper which was immediately answered by Osa Maliki from the Marhaen Development Institute Team.

== Ideology ==
Marhaenism is essentially a struggle ideology formed from Social Nationalism, Social Democracy, and the cultural divinity from Sukarno's beliefs.

One of the basic theses put forward by Sukarno was the necessity of combining the idea of national liberation with the Marxist vision of history, understood as a permanent struggle of the oppressed class with the oppressor. In such a vision of reality, the vast majority of Indonesians, as Marhaens, had participated for centuries in the historical system of class oppression, from the 350 years of the feudalistic system to the Dutch colonial system. The national liberation struggle therefore took the form of a revolution, which was to overthrow the colonial order and establish a socialist republic.

According to Marhaenism, to be economically independent and free from exploitation by other parties, each person or household needs factors of production or capital. The form can be in the form of land or machines/tools. In a modern context, vehicles, information technology devices, kitchen utensils, and electronic goods can be effectively used as capital or production factors. Although not large, the ownership of capital is necessary to ensure the independence of the person or household in the economy.

Marhaenism rejected the capitalist model of the state as contrary to the ideas of equality and democracy. Sukarno rejected liberalism and individualism. The collectivism postulated in Marhaenism, however, differed significantly from Marx's postulates regarding the socialization of the means of production. The aim of the national revolution was not to equalize the rights of the wealthy Dutch population with the rights of the indigenous inhabitants, but to gain full control over the land and means of production by the Indonesians. In contrast to capitalism, capital in Marhaenism is not to be hoarded or multiplied but is to be processed to meet the necessities of life and produce a surplus. Farmers plant to feed their own families and then sell the surplus or excess to the market. Tailors, craftsmen, and laborers produce goods, which later some will be used by themselves although the rest is of course sold. Ideally, the self-sufficiency requirement should be met before serving the market. That means when workers, craftsmen, or farmers produce goods that will not be consumed by themselves, they act only as factors of production for others, which makes them vulnerable to being dictated by the market or exploited. In aggregate (overall) in a Marhaenist economic system, goods that are not needed will not be produced because people and households must first ensure the profile and the level of their own needs before they make anything. The innovation of the birth of a new product will occur when the need is really concrete. The method encourages the achievement of efficiency and prevents wasting resources and consumptive attitudes. Because it functions only to produce a surplus, the available capital cannot be hoarded or misappropriated to suppress the economic growth and the development of other parties.

The Marhaenism that was referred to by Sukarno can be compared with the formulation of the entrepreneurship theory approach, which was introduced only in the 1970s by David McClelland, almost 50 years later. The difference is that McCleland puts more emphasis on the option of planting the need for achievement or the will to get ahead from the people or small entrepreneurs and so it is in fact dominated by a functional approach. Sukarno's approach to marhaen (farmers and small traders) is actually structural, through the cultivation of a progressive revolutionary attitude.

In a speech before the United Nations General Assembly, September 30, 1960, Sukarno firmly stated that Pancasila was essentially a sublimation of the United States Declaration of Independence and the Communist Manifesto, thus declaring that means that Pancasila was actually the third alternative from the two opposing camps in the Cold War between the Western Bloc and the Eastern Bloc at that time.

== Bibliography ==
- Dahm, Bernard (1974). "The Parties, the Masses and the Elections: A Historical Survey". In Oey Hong Lee (ed.). Indonesia After the 1971 Elections. Oxford University press. pp. 7–22. ISBN 0-19-713422-X.
- Pour, Julius (2010). Gerakan 30 September: pelaku, pahlawan & petualang [The September 30th Movement: doers, heroes & adventurers] (in Indonesian). Buku Kompas. ISBN 9789797095246.
- Saksono, Ignatius Gatut (2008). Marhaenisme Bung Karno: marxisme ala Indonesia [Bung Karno's Marhaenism: Marxism a la Indonesia] (in Indonesian). Yabinkas Learning House. ISBN 9789791118682.
- Soerojo, Soegiarso (nd). Siapa Menabur Angin akan Menuai Badai: G30S-PKI dan Peran Bung Karno [Whoever sows the wind will reap the storm: G30S-PKI and the role of Bung Karno] (in Indonesian). Soegiarso Soerojo.
- Sulistyanto, Ali (ed.). Marhaenisme Sukarno [Sukarno's Marhaenism] (in Indonesian). Promedia.
