= Lighthouse politics =

Policy in Indonesia during guided democracy

Lighthouse politics (Indonesian: politik mercusuar) was a policy concept promoted by Sukarno during the guided democracy in the 1960s aimed at making Indonesia a lighthouse or a beacon for newly independent countries in the world, through large-scale projects (known as Lighthouse Projects (Proyek Mercusuar) intended to enhance Indonesia's image in the international community. Through this policy, Sukarno aimed to position Indonesia as a central axis that could provide a model for the New Emerging Forces (NEFO) and bring Indonesia level with developed countries.

The plan included major events such as the 1962 Asian Games and preparations for the Games of the New Emerging Forces (GANEFO) as a rival to the Olympics, while major construction projects associated with the policy included the National Monument (Monas), Asian Games Complex in Senayan, Semanggi Bridge, Parliament Building, Sarinah Shopping Center, Istiqlal Mosque, Selamat Datang Monument, and others.
