= Sin Kim-dan =

North Korean sprinter

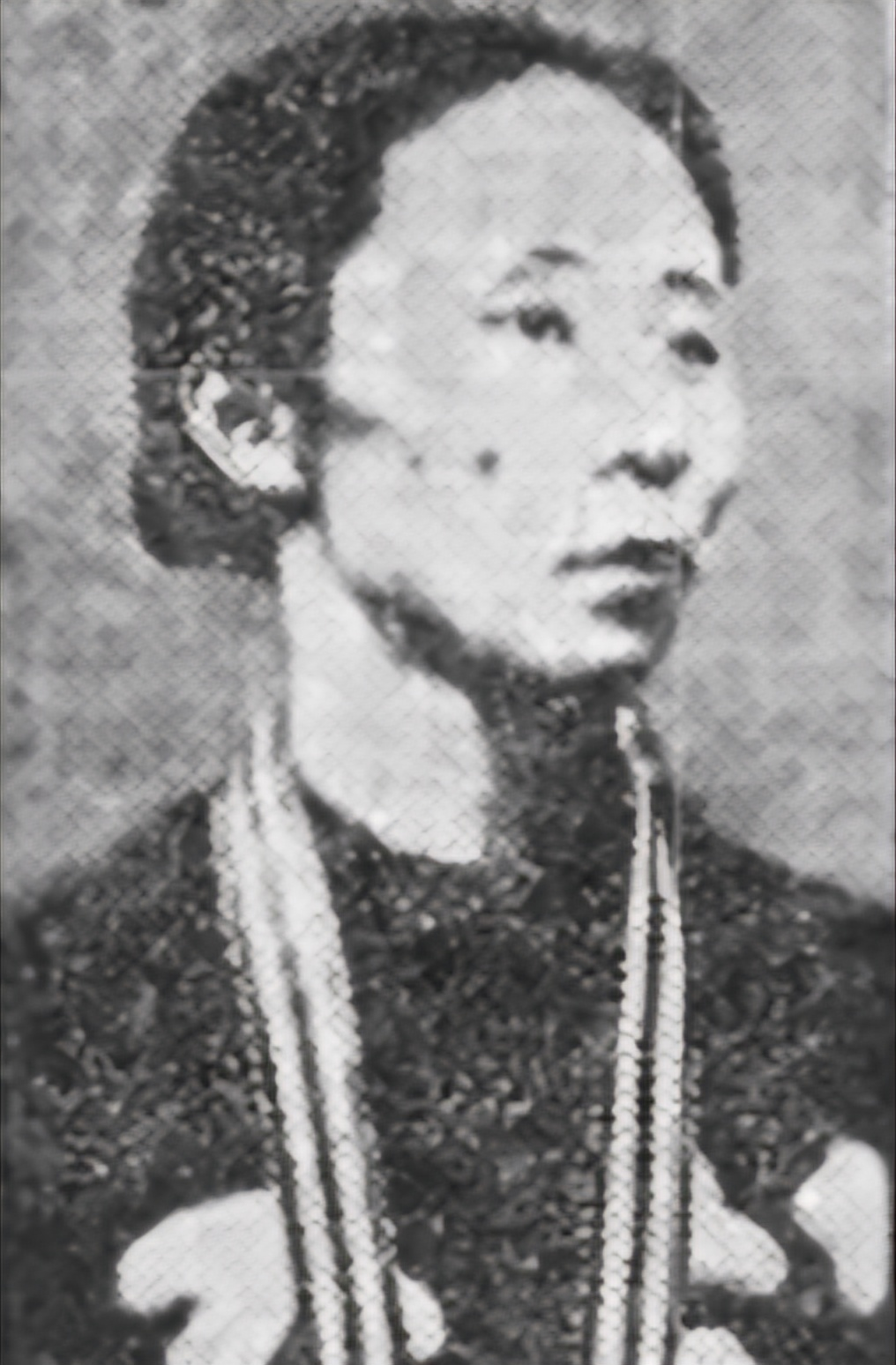

Korean name
- Hangul: 신금단
- Hanja: 辛今丹
- RR: Sin Geumdan
- MR: Sin Kŭmdan

Sin Kim-dan or Shin Keum-dan (Korean: 신금단; romanised Sin Kim Dan in English in the 1960s) (born 3 July 1938) is a North Korean former track and field athlete who competed in the 1960s in the women's 200 m, 400 m and 800 m, setting disputed world records in the latter two events.

== Biography ==
Sin worked as a lathe operator. She was separated from her father in 1950 during the Korean War. He lived in South Korea. She was described as tall and long-striding.

Excluding 1965, Sin was ranked in the top 10 in the world from 1959 to 1967 at 400 m, and from 1960 to 1967 in 800m. In October 1960, she surpassed the 400 metres world record with an unratified time of 53.0. She won the 400 m at the Brothers Znamensky Memorial meeting in Lenin Stadium, Moscow, in 1961, 62, and 63. At Pyongyang in 1962, she ran 400 m in 51.9 s, becoming the first woman to break the 53-second barrier and 52-second barrier. Of her eight claimed world record marks, this would be the only one ratified. A note in the 1964 British Athletics yearbook states, "The IAAF are withholding recognition of a time of 53.1 by Betty Cuthbert on 11.3.63 pending investigation of Sin Kim Dan's 51.9; meanwhile there is no official world record."

Sin represented North Korea at the GANEFO (Games of the New Emerging Forces) in 1963 and 1966, winning gold in the 200 m, 400 m, and 800 m at both games. Her 1963 times of 51.4 (400 m) and 1:59.1 (800 m) bettered the world records, the latter the first woman under 2 minutes. They were never ratified by the IAAF, however, as GANEFO was not an approved competition.

Sin's personal bests were set in 1964 in Pyongyang, at 51.2 for 400 m and 1:58.0 for 800 m. The IAAF suspended GANEFO competitors, effectively barring Sin from the 1964 Summer Olympics in Tokyo. Sin was reunited with her father at Haneda Airport for a few minutes before being turned back from Japan. Ann Packer won the Olympic 800 m in a new official world record of 2.01.1.

In 1966, Time magazine stated in an article on the introduction of gender verification in sports:

Finally there was Sin Kim Dan, a delicate little North Korean lass who broke the women's records at both 400 meters and 800 meters two years ago; some time later, an overjoyed elderly gentleman in South Korea recognized Sin as the son he had lost in the war.

This claim has been repeated since.

Sin was one of the first awarded the title "People's Athlete" after its creation in 1966 by the Supreme People's Assembly.

== International competition ==
Year	Competition	Venue	Position	Event	Notes
1963	GANEFO	Jakarta, Indonesia	1st	200 metres	
1963	GANEFO	Jakarta, Indonesia	1st	400 metres	
1963	GANEFO	Jakarta, Indonesia	1st	800 metres	
1966	GANEFO	Phnom Penh, Cambodia	1st	200 metres	
1966	GANEFO	Phnom Penh, Cambodia	1st	400 metres	
1966	GANEFO	Phnom Penh, Cambodia	1st	800 metres	

== See also ==
- Women's 400 metres world record progression
- 800 metres world record progression#Women
