= Athletics at the 1966 GANEFO =

II GANEFO
- Dates: November and December 1966
- Host city: Phnom Penh, Cambodia
- Events: 31

At the 1966 GANEFO, the athletics events were held in Phnom Penh, Cambodia in November and December. A total of 21 men's and 12 women's athletics events were contested at the competition. The program was the same as the previous edition, except that the men's decathlon and steeplechase events were dropped. Composed entirely of athletes from Asian nations, the events served as a counterpart to the athletics at the 1966 Asian Games, which featured largely Western-allied Asian nations.

Continuing on from the first GANEFO, China dominated the athletics competition, winning nineteen of the gold medals on offer. North Korea was the next most successful with ten gold medals. North Vietnam, Syria and Cambodia each won one gold medal each.

Ni Zhiqin, China's leading men's high jumper, was the only man to defend his title from the 1963 games. Zheng Fengrong, a former world record holder, added the high jump gold to the defence of her women's pentathlon title and also an 80 metres hurdles bronze. The most successful athlete of the tournament was Sin Kim-dan, who won the 200 metres, 400 metres and 800 metres titles – this meant she managed to defend all her 1963 titles.

== Medal summary ==
=== Men ===
Event	Gold		Silver		Bronze	
100 metres	Chen Jiaquan (CHN)	10.5	Proch Bunthol (CAM)	10.6	Yu Paoan (CHN)	10.7
200 metres	Chen Jiaquan (CHN)	21.5	Zalata (IRQ)	21.9	Chen Hungen (CHN)	22.0
400 metres	Ying Shuiken (CHN)	49.8	Pak Jun-Sik (PRK)	50.0	Chhem Savin (CAM)	50.2
800 metres	Han Yongnian (CHN)	1:52.4	Joo Hoon-Hi (PRK)	1:54.5	Nhea Khay (CAM)	1:55.1
1500 metres	Kang Hyong-Man (PRK)	3:52.0	Han Yongnian (CHN)	3:58.6	Joo Hoon-Hi (PRK)	4:00.0
5000 metres	Kang Hyong-Man (PRK)	15:15.8	Kong Son (CAM)	16:09.6	Jang Joon-Kil (PRK)	16:11.4
10,000 metres	Jo Chung-Seung (PRK)	32:05.0	Chun Man-Hyung (PRK)	32:41.4	Suos Chhin (CAM)	34:27.0
110 m hurdles	Cui Lin (CHN)	13.9	Pech Lev (CAM)	15.0	Sao Mean (CAM)	15.5
400 m hurdles	Tran Huu Chi (VNO)	55.3	Kong Saran (CAM)	55.5	Chhem Savin (CAM)	55.6
4×100 m relay	China (CHN)	41.9	Cambodia (CAM)	42.4	Iraq (IRQ)	42.6
4×400 m relay	China (CHN)	3:20.7	North Korea (PRK)	3:22.5	North Vietnam (VNO)	3:24.5
Marathon	Kim Chang-Seun (PRK)	2:42:30	Ryou Man-Hyung (PRK)	2:53:29	Koeuk (CAM)	3:41:10
High jump	Ni Zhiqin (CHN)	2.27 m	Kamal (IRQ)	1.95 m	Ri Kyung-Chil (PRK)	1.90 m
Pole vault	Jong Yong-Gil (PRK)	4.00 m	Kim Chun-Kwang (PRK)	3.90 m	Hu Zurong (CHN)	3.80 m
Long jump	Huang Zhiwu (CHN)	7.63 m	Proch Bunthol (CAM)	7.40 m	Cha Won-Sil (PRK)	7.36 m
Triple jump	Gu Keyan (CHN)	16.22 m	Tian Zhaozhong (CHN)	15.75 m	Cha Won-Sil (PRK)	15.22 m
Shot put	Kim Gyong-Il (PRK)	15.59 m	Ali Haddad (IRQ)	15.36 m	Mao Yon (CAM)	12.99 m
Discus throw	Wang Chunjuan (CHN)	49.76 m	Ri Yeung-Il (PRK)	43.28 m	Nhem Yeav (CAM)	41.96 m
Hammer throw	Merouane Bitar (SYR)	49.84 m	Saleh Jaki (IRQ)	48.06 m	Em Thuon (CAM)	42.38 m
Javelin throw	Jong Yong-Gil (PRK)	62.06 m	Kim San Chai (CAM)	59.36 m	Samak (IRQ)	59.30 m

=== Women ===
Event	Gold		Silver		Bronze	
100 metres	He Zufen (CHN)	11.9	Ri Soon-Ja (PRK)	12.1	Meas Kheng (CAM)	12.3
200 metres	Sin Kim-dan (PRK)	24.5	He Zufen (CHN)	24.7	Ri Soon-Ja (PRK)	25.4
400 metres	Sin Kim-dan (PRK)	53.1	Meas Kheng (CAM)	58.4	Ri Bok-Sil (PRK)	60.0
800 metres	Sin Kim-dan (PRK)	2:03.7	Sun Yuandung (CHN)	2:16.2	Kim Kun (CAM)	2:30.8
80 m hurdles	Li Shunu (CHN)	11.2	Son Sung-Sook (PRK)	11.6	Zheng Fengrong (CHN)	11.7
4×100 m relay	China (CHN)	48.2	North Korea (PRK)	49.2	Cambodia (CAM)	49.8
High jump	Zheng Fengrong (CHN)	1.70 m	Oh Sung-Hwan (PRK)	1.65 m	Xuan Xiaomei (CHN)	1.60 m
Long jump	Xiao Jieping (CHN)	6.12 m	Kang Yueli (CHN)	6.01 m	Son Sung-Sook (PRK)	5.48 m
Shot put	Chong Xiuyun (CHN)	16.43 m	Yuan Chiuxiang (CHN)	15.39 m	Ri Soo-Hak (PRK)	14.73 m
Discus throw	Liu Decui (CHN)	54.56 m	Ri Ko-Choon (PRK)	43.30 m	Chung Xiuyun (CHN)	40.06 m
Javelin throw	Eang Sin (CAM)	42.98 m	Dong He (CHN)	42.12 m	Nol Kan (CAM)	40.80 m
Pentathlon	Zheng Fengrong (CHN)	4300 pts	Xuan Xiaomei (CHN)	4151 pts	Oh Sung-Hwan (PRK)	3934 pts
