= Guided Democracy in Indonesia =

Period of Indonesian history from 1959 to 1966

- 5 July 1959 – 11 March 1966
Indonesian Liberal Democracy	Transition to the New Order
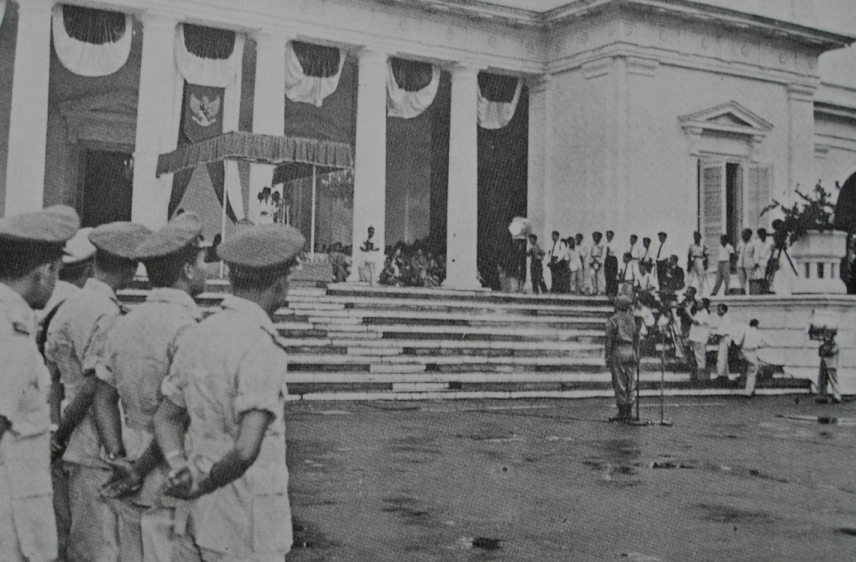
- President Sukarno reading his Presidential Decree of 5 July 1959
- Leader: Sukarno
- Key events: 1959 Presidential Decree; Operation Trikora; First broadcast of TVRI; 1962 Asian Games; New York Agreement; GANEFO; Confrontation with Malaysia; Withdrawal from the UN; Implementation of Nasakom; 30 September Movement; Indonesian mass killings of 1965–66; KAMI mass demonstration; Signing of Supersemar

Guided Democracy (Indonesian: Demokrasi Terpimpin), also retroactively called the Old Order (Indonesian: Orde Lama), was the political system in place in Indonesia from 1959 until the New Order began in 1966. This period followed the dissolution of the liberal democracy period in Indonesia by President Sukarno, who centralized control in the name of political stability. He claimed to have based the system on the traditional village system of protracted discussion and consensus, which occurred under the guidance of village elders. He envisioned himself as president playing the role of the village elders at the national level, arguing that a national consensus could express itself under presidential guidance.

In practice, however, this meant centralized rule under Sukarno: martial law, a massive reduction in civil liberties and democratic norms, and the Republic of Indonesia Armed Forces (in particular the Indonesian Army) and Communist Party of Indonesia acting as major power blocs.

Sukarno proposed a threefold blend of nationalism, religion, and communism into a co-operative Nasakom or Nas-A-Kom governmental concept. This was intended to satisfy the four main factions in Indonesian politics—the army, the secular nationalists, Islamic groups, and the communists. With the support of the military, he proclaimed Guided Democracy in 1959 and proposed a cabinet representing all major political parties including the Communist Party of Indonesia, although the latter were never actually given functional cabinet positions.

== Background ==
The liberal democracy period in Indonesia, from the re-establishment of a unitary republic in 1950 until the declaration of martial law in 1957, saw the rise and fall of six cabinets, the longest-lasting surviving for less than two years. Even Indonesia's first national elections in 1955 failed to bring about political stability.

In 1957, Indonesia faced a series of crises, including the beginning of the Permesta rebellion in Makassar and the army takeover of authority in South Sumatra, due to the increasing dissatisfaction of non-Javanese Indonesians to the centralization policy implemented by Jakarta. One of the demands of the Permesta rebels was that 70 percent of the members of Sukarno's proposed National Council should be members from the regions (non-Javanese). Another demand was that the cabinet and National Council be led by the dual-leaders (Indonesian: dwitunggal) of Sukarno and former Vice-President Hatta.

In March 1957, Sukarno accepted the Army chief of staff General Abdul Haris Nasution's proposal for a declaration of martial law across the whole nation. This would put the armed forces in charge, and would be a way to deal with the rebellious army commanders, as it would effectively legitimise them.

In the face of a growing political crisis amid splits in the cabinet, Prime Minister Ali Sastroamidjojo resigned on 14 March from his position in Sukarno's presence.

=== Establishment of Guided Democracy ===
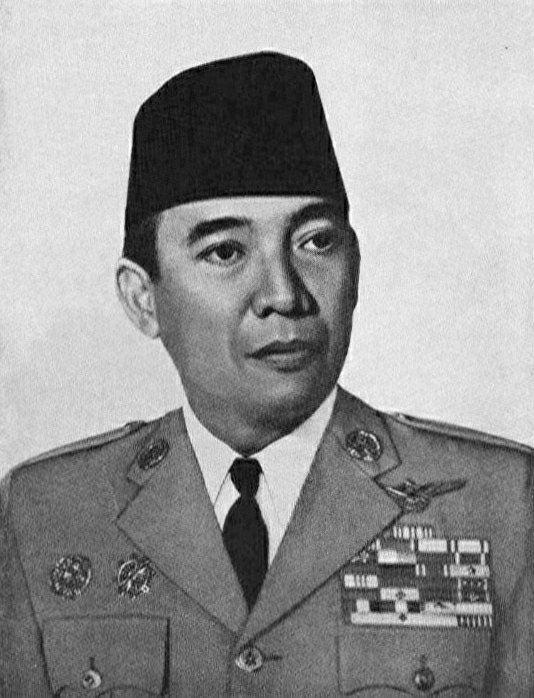
President Sukarno

President Sukarno made an official visit to the People's Republic of China in October 1956. He was impressed with the progress made there since the Civil War, and concluded that this was due to the strong leadership of Mao Zedong, whose centralisation of power was in sharp contrast to the political disorder in Indonesia. According to former foreign minister Ide Anak Agung Gde Agung, Sukarno began to believe he had been "chosen by providence" to lead the people and "build a new society".

Shortly after his return from China, on 30 October 1956, Sukarno spoke of his konsepsi (conception) of a new system of government. Two days earlier he had called for the political parties to be abolished. Initially the parties were opposed to the idea, but once it became clear that they would not need to be abolished, the Indonesian Communist Party (PKI) threw its support behind Sukarno. As well as the PKI, the Indonesian National Party (PNI) supported Sukarno, while the Islamist Masyumi Party and the Socialist Party of Indonesia opposed the plan. There were public demonstrations in support of it.

On 21 February 1957, Sukarno detailed his plan. Sukarno pointed out that at the village level, important questions were decided by lengthy deliberation with the goal of achieving a consensus. This model of decision-making, he said, was better suited to the nature of Indonesia than Western-style democracy. While deliberations at the local level were guided by the village elders, Sukarno envisioned that the president would guide them at the national level. The centerpiece would be a 'mutual co-operation' cabinet of the major parties advised by a National Council (Indonesian: Dewan Nasional) of functional groups, while the legislature would not be abolished. Sukarno argued that under this system, a national consensus could express itself under presidential guidance.

On 15 March 1957 President Sukarno appointed PNI chairman Soewirjo to form a "working cabinet", which would be tasked with establishing the National Council in accordance with the president's concept. However, since Masyumi, the largest opposition party, was not asked to participate in the formation of the cabinet, Soewirjo's efforts came to nothing. However, on 25 March, Sukarno asked Soewirjo to try form a cabinet again in one week to, but to no avail, Soewirjo failed.

Finally, Sukarno held a meeting with 69 party figures at the State Palace on 4 April 1957, at which he announced his intention to form an emergency extra-parliamentary working cabinet, whose members Sukarno would choose. The new "Working Cabinet", headed by non-partisan prime minister Djuanda Kartawidjaja was announced on 8 April 1957 at Bogor Palace. Although the PKI was not included, several members were sympathetic to the party and two Masyumi party members who accepted cabinet posts were expelled from the former. In theory, it was a non-partisan cabinet.

The National Council was established by emergency law in May 1957. It was chaired by Sukarno, with Ruslan Abdulgani as vice-chairman. At its inauguration on 12 July, it had 42 members representing groups such as peasants, workers and women, as well as the various religions. Decisions were reached by consensus rather than through voting. As a non-political body based on functional groups, it was intended as a counterbalance to the political system. The cabinet was not obliged to heed the advice given by the National Council, but in practice they rarely ignored recommendations and proposals it set.

Meanwhile, the National Armed Forces, especially the Army, was already trying to enhance their political role by establishing functional groups of their own with efforts by the officer corps. Nasution began trying to woo the parties' functional groups in June 1957, and managed to unite the many veterans' organizations under armed forces control as the Veterans' Legion of Indonesia, a singular organization dedicated to veterans' affairs. He also used martial law to arrest several politicians for alleged corruption, while regional army commanders restricted party activities, particularly those of the PKI, whose headquarters in Jakarta was attacked in July.

==== Manipol/USDEK ====
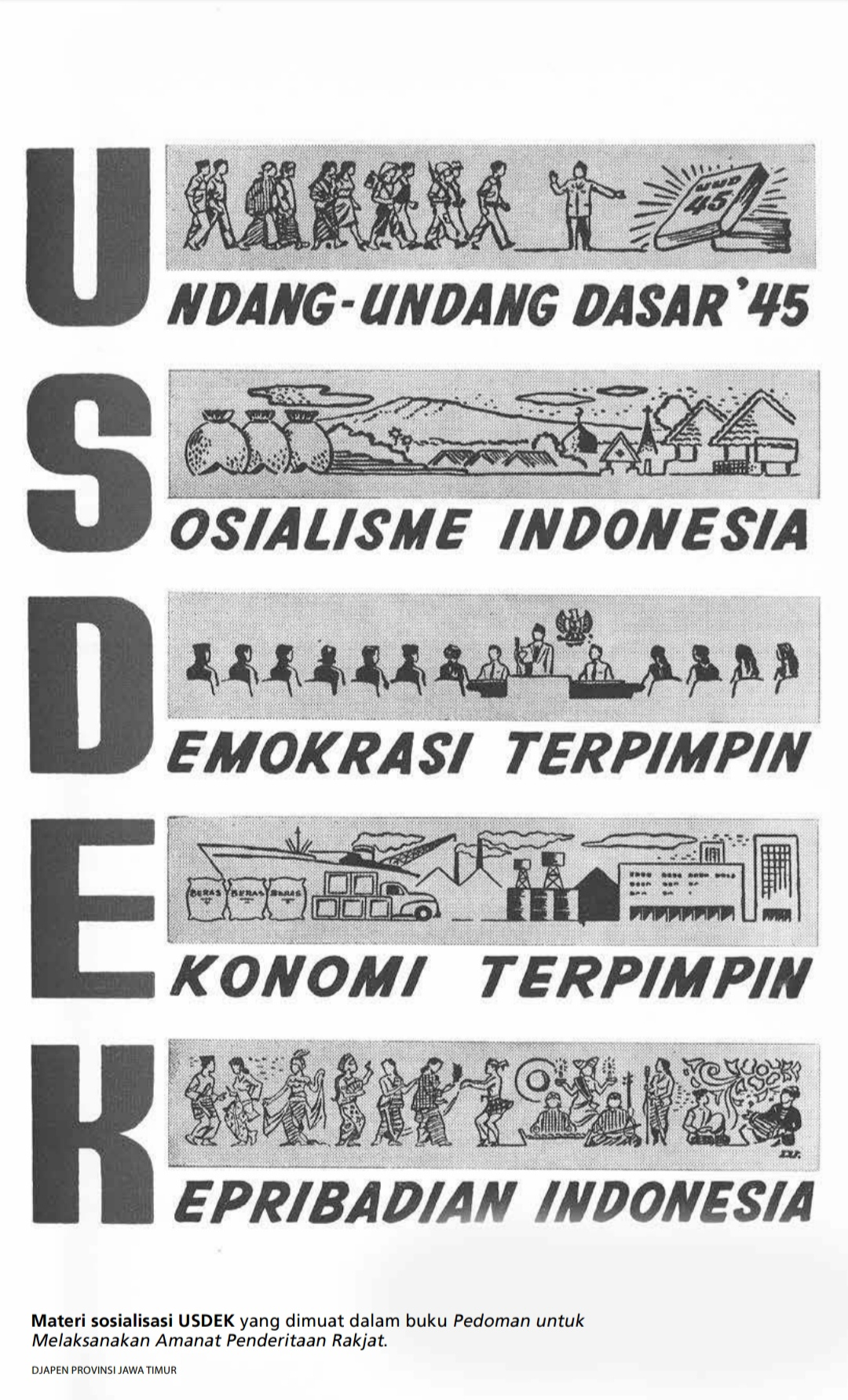
A Poster for Manipol/USDEK socialisation material, 1961

In an attempt to unify the polarization of politics in Indonesia, Sukarno created a manifesto, Manipol/USDEK, that was mandated to be taught in schools during the Guided Democracy Era. In his Independence Day address on 17 August 1957, Sukarno laid down the ideology of guided democracy, later renamed the Manipol (Political Manifesto). This was later expanded into the ideology known as USDEK - combined into Manipol USDEK (USDEK Political Manifesto). The five points of this ideology were the following:

- the 1945 Constitution (Undang-Undang Dasar 1945)
- Indonesian-styled socialism (Sosialisme ala Indonesia)
- Guided democracy (Demokrasi Terpimpin)
- Guided economic policies (Ekonomi Terpimpin)
- Indonesian identity (Kepribadian Indonesia)

Manipol/USDEK was intended to serve as the foundation of the government and used as an effort against the forces of Western neocolonialism, colonialism, and imperialism (Nekolim) in honor the countless fellow heroes and martyrs of the National Revolution against the Netherlands that Sukarno led as the founder of the nation. When the Provisional People's Consultative Assembly held its first session in 1960, Manipol/USDEK was made official Guidelines of State Policy (later joined by the Nasakom ideology), so that they must be upheld, nurtured, and implemented by all Indonesians, and said ideology was mandated to be a part of a new anti-Western national education curriculum in schools. The official book on Manipol/USDEK consists of President Sukarno's speech titled "Rediscovery of Our Revolution" made on the 14th Independence Day of the Republic of Indonesia on 17 August 1959. According to Sukarno, the book on Manipol/USDEK likens the Pancasila and the Political Manifesto/USDEK to the Quran and authentic Hadith, which are one and the same, so the Pancasila and the Political Manifesto/USDEK are also "one and the same".

=== Regional rebellions during the liberal democracy era ===
In the midst of the Cold War, the CIA—along with the UK and Australian governments—supported rebellions in Sumatra and Sulawesi during 1958. These rebellions were launched as reactions to Sukarno's seizure of parliamentarian power, the increasing influence of the Communists, the corruption and mismanagement of the central government, and against the domination by Java of the outer islands.

In September and October 1957, various rebellious army officers, including members of the Permesta movement, held meetings in Sumatra. They agreed on three objectives: the appointment of a president less in favor of the PKI, the replacement of Nasution as the head of armed forces and the banning of the PKI. Some of these regional rebels were subsequently accused of involvement in the assassination attempt on Sukarno on 30 November. On 10 February 1958, rebels including army officers and Masyumi leaders meeting in Padang, Sumatra, issued an ultimatum to the government demanding the return of parliamentary system, through the dissolution of the cabinet, elections and Sukarno's position as a figurehead role. Five days later, the formation of Revolutionary Government of the Republic of Indonesia (PRRI), announced. It was based in Bukittinggi, Sumatra, joined two days later by the Permesta rebels in Sulawesi.

Despite US support in the form of arms for the PRRI rebels, the Indonesian military defeated the rebels with a combination of aerial bombardment and operations by troops landed from Java. By the middle of 1958, the rebellions had been effectively quashed but guerrilla activity persisted for three years. Amnesty was granted to rebel leaders although their political parties were banned. Early nationalist leaders were discredited, including former Prime Minister Sutan Sjahrir, who along with others was arrested in 1962.

== Formation ==
=== Return to the 1945 Constitution ===
The structure of the Indonesian government in 1962

In 1958, Masyumi and the Nahdlatul Ulama, which had split from Masyumi in 1952, called for the planned 1959 elections to be postponed as they feared a PKI victory. In September, prime minister Djuanda announced the postponement. Meanwhile, the Constitutional Assembly was still unable to reach agreement on the basis of a new constitution, and was deadlocked between those who wanted Indonesia to be an Islamic state, and those who supported the idea of the state based on the Pancasila ideology. In July, Nasution proposed returning to the 1945 Constitution, and in September, he resumed political activity. Sukarno quickly endorsed this idea, as the 1945 document made the president head of government as well as head of state and would thus be better suited to implementing Guided democracy. Under the Provisional Constitution of 1950, the president's role was largely ceremonial as head of state, though Sukarno commanded great moral authority due to his status as Father of the Nation.

Gradually, the return to the 1945 Constitution gained support from the political parties, and on 5 July 1959, Sukarno issued a decree (formally Presidential Decree number 150 of 1959 on the Return to the Constitution of 1945) to reinstate the 1945 constitution and dissolving the Constitutional Assembly. Four days later, a working cabinet with Sukarno as prime minister was announced, and in July, the National Council and Supreme Advisory Council were established. Although political parties continued to exist, only the PKI had any real strength.

== Politics ==
=== Marginalization of Islamic political parties ===
After the dissolution of the Constitutional Assembly, Sukarno banned Masyumi in 1960 due to its leaders' ties with the PRRI and strong opposition against the new form of government. The representation of Islamic parties in the parliament were down to 25 percent, while Nahdlatul Ulama's influence also reduced even though its official stance was to support the implementation of guided democracy.

=== Rise of the PKI ===
Government apparatus burning Western music recordings, mainly The Beatles, during high anti-Western sentiment in Jakarta (1965)

In an attempt to strengthen his position in his rivalry with Nasution, Sukarno gradually became closer to the PKI and to the Indonesian Air Force. In March 1960, Sukarno dissolved the legislature after it had rejected his budget. In June, the Mutual Cooperation House of People's Representatives (DPR-GR), in which the armed services and police had representation as functional groups, and a Provisional People's Consultative Assembly (MPRS) were established, with the PKI chairman, D.N. Aidit, as a deputy chairman. The PKI was estimated to have 17–25 percent of the seats in the DPR-GR, and now had representation in all institutions of state except the cabinet. Despite actions against the PKI by regional army commanders, Sukarno repeatedly defended it. Sukarno also began pushing his ideology uniting Nationalism, Religion and Communism, which would become known as Nasakom. It is an acronym based on the Indonesian words NASionalisme ('nationalism'), Agama ('religion'), and KOMunisme ('communism'). The Nasakom ideology was an attempt by Sukarno to create an Indonesian form of socialism which would mix socialist and nationalist ideas and adapt them to the unique Indonesian situation of a nation of thousands of islands, many ethnic groups, and diverse religions.

However, the army's successes in defeating various rebellions, including the PRRI and the Darul Islam movement in west Java meant that Nasution still had the initiative. Later that year, the PKI began a "unilateral action" (Indonesian: aksi sepihak) campaign to implement the 1959–60 land reform laws, which led to violent conflict with NU supporters. Therefore, in December 1960, Sukarno established the Supreme Operations Command (KOTI), to ensure that the campaign to liberate West Irian from the Dutch would not be controlled by the military. Actual combat operations were to be directed by the Mandala command, headed by (future president) Major-General Suharto, who was the first commander of the Kostrad. The PKI, anxious to make use of the nationalism issue to cement its alliance with Sukarno, wholeheartedly supported this effort. In June 1962, Sukarno managed to foil an attempt by Nasution to be appointed armed forces commander; he instead became chief of staff with no direct military commanding role, although he kept his position as minister of defence and security.

By 1962, the PKI had over two million members, and in March, Sukarno made two of its key figures, Aidit and Njoto, ministers without portfolio. That same year, the West Irian dispute was resolved after the Dutch agreeing a transfer to UN administration. It was later formally annexed by Indonesia after the controversial 'Act of Free Choice' in 1969.

In early 1965, Aidit proposed to Sukarno the creation of "the Fifth Force" (i.e. in addition to the army, navy, air force and police), made up of armed workers and peasants and the appointment of Nasakom advisers to each of the armed forces. This was a direct threat to the armed services. In 1965, Sukarno announced the discovery of a document allegedly written by the British ambassador, the so-called Gilchrist Document, which was touted as proof of armed forces-led plots against the government.

=== Rise of the political roles of the armed forces and police ===
The 1960 decision by Sukarno to appoint sectoral representatives each to the Provisional People's Consultative Assembly and the Mutual Cooperation House of Representatives began 44 years of a military and police presence in the legislature. Some of the 241 sectoral MPs appointed to the PPCA were active duty personnel of the armed forces and police which gave an even more political role for the armed forces, which served as counterbalance to the PKI presence in the legislature. These armed forces and police representatives thus formed a loyal opposition to the PKI in the legislative branch. To counter the PKI-supported Central All-Indonesian Workers Organization, the SOKSI (Central Workers' Organization of Indonesia) was established in late 1961 with strong armed forces support, three years later, in October 1964, the Sekber Golkar (Sekretariat Bersama Golongan Karya, or Joint Secretariat of Functional Groups), the future Golkar Party, was established to unite the many anti-communist organizations that have been led and sponsored by the armed forces and police. Among the 60 armed forces organizations under the Golkar umbrella, aside from the SOKSI, were the Kosgoro (Union of Mutual Cooperation Multifunction Organizations), MKGR (Mutual Assistance Families Association) and the Gerakan Karya Rakyat (People's Working Movement). Even as some personnel in the armed forces and police sided with the PKI and many were either sympathizers or joining in increasing numbers (including personnel of the Marine Corps, Air Force and the Police Mobile Brigade Corps), majority of the active military personnel and sworn police officers were anti-Communists, including many top Army officers.

Aside from the legislative branch, the armed forces and police also began to be present even in the executive, with Sukarno appointing many officers from the services to government ministries in the state cabinet aside from the Ministry of Defense and Security. In the March 1963 General Session of the PPCA in Bandung in West Java, Sukarno, in a major violation of the 1945 Constitution, was elected to the life presidency (Presiden Seumur Hidup/Panglima Besar Revolusi) with the help of the armed forces and police, including their deputies to the assembly as suggested by Nasution, in a major blow to the PKI's plans for the presidential post.

== Economy ==
Following the failure of a United Nations resolution calling on the Netherlands to negotiate with Indonesia over the West Irian issue, on 3 December, PKI and PNI unions began taking over Dutch companies, but 11 days later, Nasution stated that personnel from the armed forces would run these companies instead. This action then gave the armed forces a major economic role in the country.

On 25 August 1959, the government implemented sweeping anti-inflationary measures, devaluing the currency by 75 percent and declaring that all Rp. 500 and Rp. 1000 notes would henceforth be worth one tenth of their face value. Meanwhile, anti-ethnic Chinese measures, including repatriations and forced transfer to cities, damaged economic confidence further. In 1960, inflation had reached 100 percent per annum.

== Foreign policy ==
=== West New Guinea dispute and takeover ===
After the recognition of Indonesia as a sovereign state (soevereiniteitsoverdracht) on 27 December 1949, both Indonesia and The Netherlands agreed that the issue regarding the status of New-Guinea or West Irian (present-day Papua and West Papua) will be negotiated one year after the formation of the federal government. Indonesia rejected Netherlands proposal to retain the sovereignty over the territory, considering it as an integral part of the country. On 15 February 1952, the Dutch Parliament voted to incorporate New Guinea into the realm of the Netherlands. After that, the Netherlands refused further discussion on the question of sovereignty and considered the issue to be closed.

On 23 February 1957, a thirteen country–sponsored resolution (Bolivia, Burma, Ceylon, Costa Rica, Ecuador, India, Iraq, Pakistan, Saudi Arabia, Sudan, Syria, and Yugoslavia) calling for the United Nations to appoint a "good offices commission" for West New Guinea was submitted to the UN General Assembly. Despite receiving a plural majority (40-25-13), this second resolution failed to gain a two-thirds majority. Undeterred, the Afro-Asian caucus in the United Nations lobbied for the West New Guinea dispute to be included on the UNGA's agenda. On 4 October 1957, the Indonesian Foreign Minister Subandrio warned that Indonesia would embark on "another cause" if the United Nations failed to bring about a solution to the dispute that favoured Indonesia. That month, the Indonesian Communist Party and affiliated trade unions lobbied for retaliatory economic measures against the Dutch. On 26 November 1957, a third Indonesian resolution on the West New Guinea dispute was put to the vote but failed to gain a two-thirds majority (41-29-11). In response, Indonesia took retaliatory measure against Dutch interests in Indonesia. Following a sustained period of harassment against Dutch diplomatic representatives in Jakarta, the Indonesian government formally severed relations with the Netherlands in August 1960.

By 1960, other countries in the Asia-Pacific region had taken notice of the West Irian dispute and began proposing initiatives to end the dispute. During a visit to the Netherlands, the New Zealand Prime Minister Walter Nash suggested the idea of a united New Guinea state, consisting of both Dutch and Australian territories. This idea received little support from both the Indonesians and other Western governments. Later that year, the Malayan Prime Minister Tunku Abdul Rahman proposed a three-step initiative, which involved West New Guinea coming under United Nations trusteeship. The joint administrators would be three non-aligned nations Ceylon, India, and Malaya, which supported Indonesia's position on West Irian. This solution involved the two belligerents, Indonesia and the Netherlands, re-establishing bilateral relations and the return of Dutch assets and investments to their owners. However, this initiative was scuttled in April 1961 due to opposition from the Indonesian Foreign Minister Subandrio, who publicly attacked the Tunku's proposal.

On 23 November 1961, the Indian delegation at the United Nations presented a draft resolution calling for the resumption of Dutch–Indonesian talks on terms which favoured Indonesia. On 25 November 1961, several Francophone African countries tabled a rival resolution which favoured an independent West New Guinea. The Indonesians favoured the Indian resolution while the Dutch, Britain, Australia, and New Zealand supported the Francophone African resolution. On 27 November 1961, both the Francophone African (52-41-9) and Indian (41-40-21) resolutions were put to the vote failed to gain a two–thirds majority at the United Nations General Assembly. The failure of this final round of diplomacy in the UN convinced the Indonesians to prepare for a military invasion of West Irian.

On 19 December 1961, President Sukarno gave orders for the Indonesian military to prepare for a full–scale military invasion of the territory; codenamed Operation Trikora. He also ordered the creation of a special People's Triple Command or Tri Komando Rakyat (Trikora) with the objective of 'liberating' West New Guinea by 1 January 1963. Trikora's operational command was to be called the Mandala Command for the Liberation of West Irian (Komando Mandala Pembebasan Irian Barat) and was led by Major-General Suharto, the future President of Indonesia. In preparation for the planned invasion, the Mandala command began making land, air, and sea incursions into West Irian. General Suharto also planned to launch a full-scale amphibious operation invasion of West Irian known as Operation Jayawijaya (or Operation Djajawidjaja).

On 24 June 1962, four Indonesian Air Force C-130 Hercules jets dropped 213 paratroopers near Merauke. Throughout the year, a total of 1,200 Indonesian paratroopers and 340 naval infiltrators landed in West New Guinea. By mid-1962, the Indonesian military had begun preparations to launch Operation Jayawijaya around August 1962. This operation was to be carried out in four phases and would have involved joint air and naval strikes against Dutch airfields, paratroop and amphibious landings at Biak and Sentani, and a ground assault on the territory's capital Hollandia. Unknown to the Indonesians, Dutch intelligence agency Marid 6 NNG had intercepted Indonesian transmissions and obtained intelligence on Indonesian battle plans. However, a ceasefire agreement known as the New York Agreement, which facilitated the transfer of West New Guinea to Indonesia control by 1963, was signed by the Dutch and Indonesians on 15 August 1962. As a result, the Trikora Command cancelled Operation Jayawijaya on 17 August 1962.

=== Confrontation with Malaysia ===
In 1963 the establishment of Malaysia was announced, incorporating Federation of Malaya and the former British colonial possessions in northern Borneo. Indonesia rejected the formation as a neo-colonialist project of the United Kingdom. The Philippines also rejected the formation due to its claim to Sabah. PKI once again sought to exploit the issue to strengthen its political position. They organised mass demonstrations in Jakarta, during which the British Embassy was burned to the ground. On 17 September, a day after Malaysia was established, Indonesia broke off diplomatic relations with Malaysia, and shortly after, the low level conflict known as konfrontasi (confrontation) was commenced.

Meanwhile, the army led by Lt. General Ahmad Yani became increasingly concerned with the worsening domestic situation and began to secretly contact the Malaysian government, while managing to obstruct the confrontation to minimal level. This was implemented to preserve an already exhausted army which recently conducted the Operation Trikora, while also maintaining its political position. At the same time, both the Soviet Union and the United States began courting the Indonesian army. The Soviet Union was anxious to reduce the influence of the China-oriented PKI, while the US was worried about communism per se, and large numbers of Indonesian officers travelled to the US for military training. However, during the confrontation the PKI was also targeting the army, and was attempting to infiltrate it.

Sukarno withdrew Indonesia from the United Nations on 7 January 1965 when, with U.S. backing, Malaysia took a seat on UN Security Council. The confrontation largely subsided after the September 30 Movement weakened Sukarno's political standing. Both countries signed the Bangkok Accords on 16 August 1966, albeit protest from Sukarno. Relations between both countries were fully restored on 31 August 1967.

== End of Guided Democracy ==
During his 1964 Independence Day speech, Sukarno publicly denounced the United States. An anti-American campaign ensued in which American companies were threatened, American movies were banned, American libraries and other buildings were attacked, American journalists banned, and the American flag was often torn apart. Large anti-American propaganda posters were set up around Jakarta's streets. American aid was stopped. In August 1965, Sukarno announced that Indonesia was withdrawing from the International Monetary Fund and the World Bank, and in his Independence Day speech on 17 August, announced the Jakarta-Phnom Penh-Hanoi-Peking-Pyongyang Axis, and said that the people would be armed in the coming months. On 27 September, General Nasution announced that he opposed the planned "fifth force" formation and the "Nasakomization" of the entire armed forces.

On the night of 30 September 1965, six generals were kidnapped and murdered and a group calling itself the 30 September Movement seized control of the national radio station and the centre of Jakarta. Although the movement was quickly crushed by Suharto it marked the end of guided democracy and of Sukarno as an effective president. The New Order regime established by Suharto had its own ideology — Pancasila Democracy.
