= Siapa Menabur Angin akan Menuai Badai: G30S-PKI dan Peran Bung Karno =

1988 book by Soegiarso Soerojo

- Author: Soegiarso Soerojo
- Language: Indonesian
- Subject: History
- Published: May 1988
- Pages: 578
- OCLC: 20816616

Siapa Menabur Angin akan Menuai Badai: G30S-PKI dan Peran Bung Karno (Note: transl. Those Who Sow the Wind Will Reap the Whirlwind: G30S-PKI and the Role of Bung Karno.) is a 1988 book by Soegiarso Soerojo, a retired military officer, concerning the history of the Indonesian Communist Party (PKI), the 30 September Movement (G30S) coup attempt, and the role of President Sukarno in G30S. Soegiarso argues that Sukarno was a Marxist and a Communist, that he allowed the PKI to grow and rebuild after the Madiun Affair, and that he was the mastermind (dalang) behind the G30S plot.

The book was highly controversial and was received with hostility. Its publication led to a heated debate on the teachings of Sukarno and his historical significance.

== Background ==
On the final day of the 1987 election campaign, the Indonesian Democratic Party (PDI) held a massive rally in Jakarta. This caught the attention of Soegiarso Soerojo, a retired colonel and former intelligence officer in the Indonesian Army, who saw the use of red in the rally and was reminded of the outlawed Indonesian Communist Party (PKI). This inspired him to finish writing Siapa Menabur Angin.

== Summary ==
The book consists of 578 pages and is divided into five chapters. The first four chapters chronologically follow Indonesian history, starting from the struggle for independence, era of liberal democracy, guided democracy, and finally the New Order. Meanwhile, the conclusion serves as the final chapter. According to Karen B. Brooks, Soegiarso discusses the history of the PKI, mainly focusing on the political dominance of the PKI in the 1960s and extent of support the PKI received from President Sukarno. He argues that Sukarno allowed the PKI to rebuild after its destruction in the Madiun Affair.
