= Mohammad Sarengat =

Indonesian sprinter

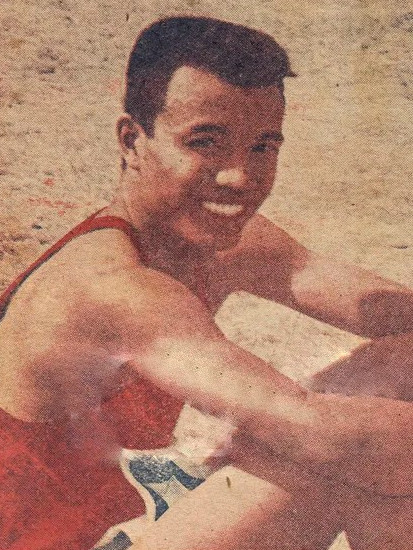

Personal information
- Born: October 28, 1939 Banyumas, Dutch East Indies
- Died: October 13, 2014 (aged 74) Jakarta, Indonesia
Medal record
Men's athletics
Representing Indonesia
Asian Games
Gold medal – first place	1962 Jakarta	100 m
Gold medal – first place	1962 Jakarta	110 m hurdles
Bronze medal – third place	1962 Jakarta	200 m
GANEFO
Gold medal – first place	1963 Jakarta	4x100 m relay
Silver medal – second place	1963 Jakarta	110 m hurdles

Mohammad Sarengat (October 28, 1939 – October 13, 2014) was an Indonesian track and field sprinter. Sarengat became the first Indonesian athlete to win a gold medal at the Asian Games. He won gold in the 100-meter sprint at the 1962 Asian Games.

Born in Kedunguter in Banyumas Regency, he was the eldest of ten children born to Prawirosuprapto, a local teacher, and was given the name “Sarengat,” which is the Javanese pronunciation of the Arabic term “syari'at” (sharia), he grew up in Batang Regency before settling in Surabaya. He came from a sporting family – his uncle Mursanyoto was a goalkeeper for the Indonesia national football team.

Sarengat won the gold medal in the 100-meter sprint at the 1962 Asian Games held in Jakarta in 10.4 seconds. The win made Sarengat the first Indonesian gold medalist at any Asian Games. He also won a second gold medal at the competition, winning the 110-meter hurdles with an Asian record time of 14.3 seconds. He also won a bronze medal in the 200-meter sprint. Sarengat held the Indonesian record for the 100-meter sprint (10.4 seconds) for the next twenty-two years, until it was broken by sprinter Mohamed Purnomo at the 1984 Summer Olympics in Los Angeles.

Only two other Indonesian athletes have won gold medals at the Asian Games since 1962 - Supriyati Sutono and Maria Natalia Londa. Following his Asian Games win, his only other international medal of note was a silver medal in the 110 m hurdles at the 1963 GANEFO Games, where he placed behind China's Gao Jiqiao. Following his retirement, a football stadium in Batang Regency (his home area) was named in honour as the Moh Sarengat Stadium.

After finishing his sports career he trained as a medic and went on to serve as physician for the Indonesian vice president Adam Malik. He had a wife and children. Sarengat died on October 13, 2014, at Pondok Indah Hospital in South Jakarta at the age of 73. He had been hospitalized since suffering a stroke in 2012.
