= Bonderman =

Bonderman is a surname. Notable people with the surname include:

- David Bonderman (1942–2024), American businessman
- Jeremy Bonderman (born 1982), American baseball player
