= Zheng Fengrong =

Chinese high jumper (1937–2026)

Personal information
- Born: 25 May 1937 Jinan, Shandong
- Died: 25 August 2026 (aged 89)
- Spouse: Duan Qiyan
- Children: Duan Li
- Relatives: Zheng Ninali (granddaughter); Zheng Enlai (grandson)

Sport
- Sport: Track and field

Zheng Fengrong (Chinese: 郑凤荣; Wade–Giles: Cheng Feng-jung, 25 May 1937 – 25 August 2026) was a Chinese athlete who competed in the high jump event.

== Biography ==
Zheng was born in Jinan, Shandong on 25 May 1937. Joining the national team in 1953, Zheng broke the high jump world record with a jump of 1.77 m in 1957, making her the first Chinese woman to hold a sports world record. The domestic media hailed her as "the swallow who announced that the spring of China's sports has arrived," and Chinese research claims, that her training was twice as arduous as her foreign competitors. A 2007 profile in China Daily compared Zheng's popularity in her day with that of Liu Xiang today.

Since the People's Republic of China did not compete in the Summer Olympics between 1952 and 1984, Zheng could not participate in the 1956 competition, won by Mildred McDaniel, whose world record Zheng bettered. In her subsequent career and in retirement she won official honours and recognition as an early athletic success for the PRC. Though persecuted for "egotism" during the Cultural Revolution, she eventually rose to become vice-secretary of the China State General Sports Administration. She married the 1959 Chinese high jump champion, Duan Qiyan 段其炎.

Zheng was one of eight athletes who carried the Olympic flag in the 2008 Beijing Olympics opening ceremonies.

She won several medals at the Chinese National Games. She won the athletics][triathlon]] and high jump titles at the 1959 Chinese National Games and the heptathlon at the 1965 Chinese National Games. She was also successful at the GANEFO: she won the women's pentathlon and was high jump runner-up at the 1963 edition, then won a pentathlon and high jump double at the 1966 games, as well as an 80 metres hurdles bronze.

Her granddaughter Nina Schultz is a heptathlete that competed for Canada internationally and at Kansas State University in the collegiate level. She ultimately renounced her Canadian citizenship in 2021 for the People's Republic of China, with her intention to compete for China in future sports events.

Zheng died on 25 August 2026, at the age of 89.
