= Hu Zurong =

Chinese pole vaulter

Personal information
- Native name: 胡祖榮
- Born: 1939 or 1940 (age 85–86)
- Occupation: Sports administrator

Sport
- Country: China
- Sport: Athletics
- Event: Pole vault

Hu Zurong (Chinese: 胡祖榮; pinyin: Hú Zǔ-róng; born 1939 or 1940) is a male Chinese athlete and sports administrator. Hu broke national records in pole vaulting, and held the national record for over 10 years.

Hu Zurong graduated from the Class of 1960 at Nanyang Model High School, Shanghai, China. He won gold in pole vault for athletics at the 1963 GANEFO, and bronze in pole vault for athletics at the 1966 GANEFO. He was national champion in pole vault at the 1965 National Championships of the People's Republic of China. In 1971, during training, he injured both his legs and became paralyzed. He authored the books "Physical Training: 1400 Examples" (身體訓練1400例) and "Pole Vault" (撐竿跳高). He was awarded an honorary medal for physical culture and sports in 1980. Later, in the 1980s, he became vice president of the Chinese Paralympic Sports Association.
