= Nasakom =

Union of socialist, nationalist, and religious values

Nasakom (Indonesian: Nasionalisme, Agama, Komunisme; Nationalism, Religion, Communism), was a political concept coined by President Sukarno. This concept prevailed in Indonesia from 1959 during the Guided Democracy Era until the New Order, in 1966. Sukarno's idea of Nasakom was an attempt to unify various political ideologies. Nasakom attempted to unite the nationalist, religious, and communist groups that at that time had the most power in Indonesian politics.

== Development ==
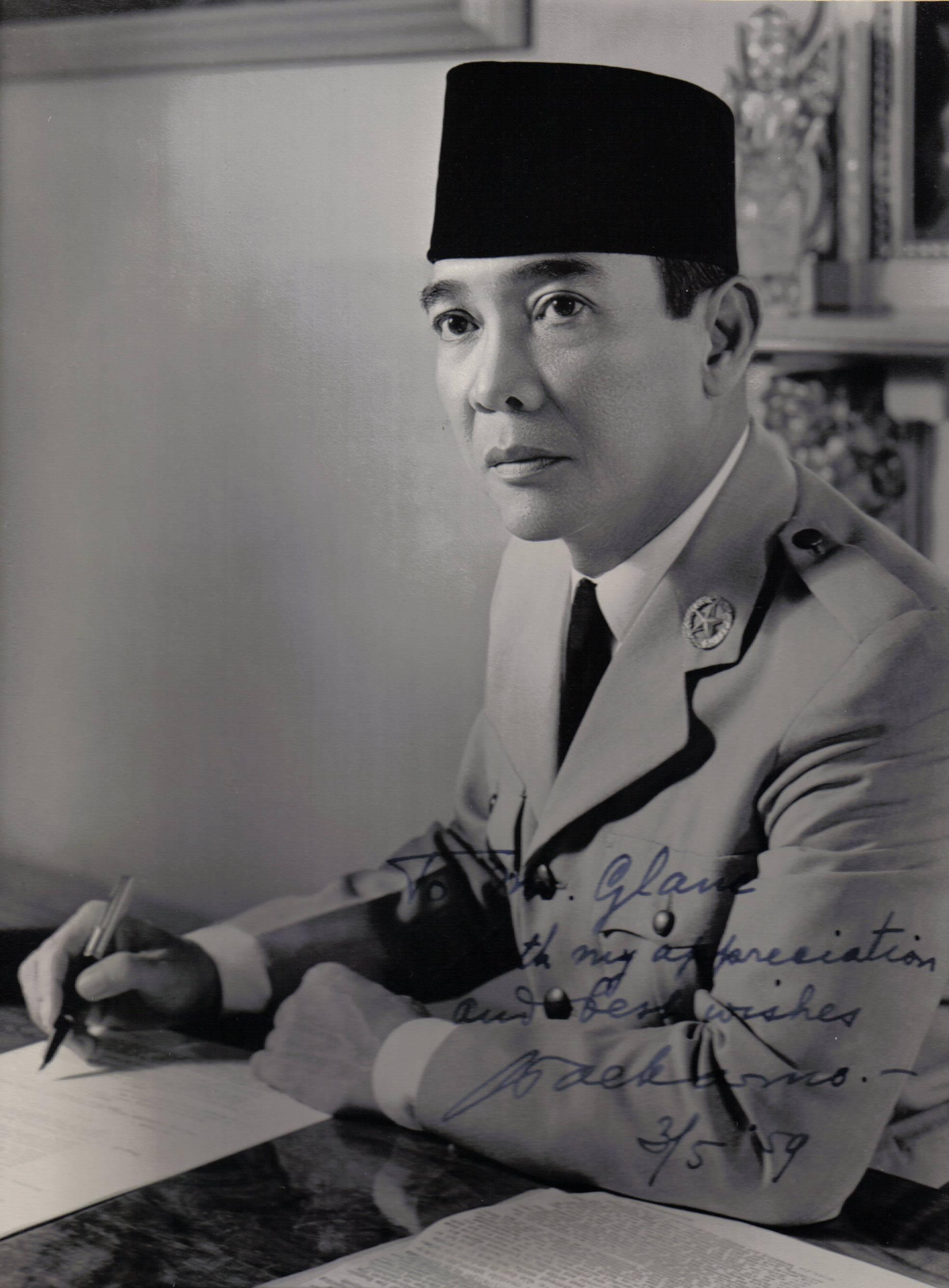
President Sukarno—Author of the Nasakom concept

Since the beginning of the struggle for Indonesian independence, there were three political movements that coloured the various movement organisations of the time. For example Indische Party and Sarekat Indies which were "nationalist", Sarekat Islam which had an Islamic ideology, and ISDV/PKI which had a Marxist ideology. The idea of Nasakom had actually been thought of by Sukarno since 1927, long before Indonesia's independence. Sukarno wrote a series of articles entitled "Nationalism, Islam and Marxism" in the magazine Soeloeh Indonesia Moeda, a published publication of the "Algemeene Studieclub", the club Sukarno and his associates had founded in Bandung, inspired by a similar organization founded by Soetomo in Surabaya. The understanding of communism here was something more akin to socialism. The basis for this idea is the principle of social justice, which is also the basis of Karl Marx's political thought. Sukarno's political philosophy at the time was essentially a fusion of elements of Marxism, Indonesian nationalism, and Islam. This was reflected in his proposed version of Pancasila to the BPUPK in his speech on 1 June 1945. In the article, Sukarno stressed the importance of a national unity of nationalists, Islamists, Marxists in an uncompromising (non-cooperative) resistance to the Dutch. According to Sukarno:

"Nationalism, Islam, and Marxism, these are the principles that the people's movements throughout Asia have adhered to. These are the ideas that have become the spirit of the movements in Asia. They are also the spirit of the movements in Indonesia - our country."

— Sukarno,

By 1956, Sukarno conveyed this idea. He publicly criticised the Parliamentary Democracy system, which he considered unsuitable for implementation in Indonesia. According to Sukarno, Parliamentary Democracy protects the capitalist system, and because the parliament is controlled by the bourgeoisie, this system cannot prosper the people. In addition, Sukarno also considered that Parliamentary Democracy could endanger the government, stating that it was "based upon inherent conflict" which ran counter to Indonesian notions of harmony as being the natural state of human relationships. Instead, he sought a system based on the traditional village system of discussion and consensus (Gotong-Royong), under the guidance of village elders.

Therefore, in February 1956, Sukarno proposed a new concept called Nasakom based on three main pillars. The three pillars were Nationalism, Religion, and Communism. These three pillars were intended to appease the three main factions in Indonesian politics—the army, Islamic groups, and the communists—and served as the basis of his government, while Pancasila being the national philosophy of the nation. He did not intend for the concept of Nasakom to replace Pancasila, as Sukarno worded Nasakom more as an operational concept and interpretation, rather than that of an ideological concept. With the support of the military, in February he proclaimed 'Guided Democracy', and proposed a cabinet that would represent all the political parties of importance (including the PKI). Though accordingly, Sukarno displayed greater sympathies to the communists and started admitting more communists into his government, while developing a strong relationship with the PKI chairman Dipa Nusantara Aidit.

== Implementation of Nasakom ==
=== Proclamation of the Resopim Doctrine ===
Nasakom is Correct (Nasakom adalah benar), containing the speech of President Sukarno on June 1, 1965.

President Sukarno introduced the teachings of Revolution, Indonesian Socialism, and National Leadership (Resopim). The aim of this doctrine was to strengthen President Sukarno's position in the government. The Resopim doctrine was announced on 17 August 1961, the 16th anniversary of the Proclamation of Independence of the Republic of Indonesia. The essence of this teaching was that all elements of the life of the nation and state must be achieved through revolution, imbued with socialism, and controlled by one national figurehead styled the 'Commander-in-Chief of the Revolution' (PBR), namely President Sukarno. Officially, the aim of the Resopim doctrine was to "mobilise all state and national life to achieve national self-reliance" and to "resist new-style colonialism". In reality, the doctrine was used to consolidate Sukarno's grip on Indonesia's government as the doctrine placed Sukarno as the highest and most important form of government body in Indonesia. The impact of the Resopim's socialisation was that the positions of the state's highest and most senior institutions could only be established and appointed by the Commander-in-Chief of the Revolution. The leaders of the institutions were seen as assistants to the president.

=== Changes in politics ===
After Nasakom was formed, Sukarno increasingly campaigned for the concept. Sukarno united three political forces in order to strengthen his position. The three political parties that became the main factions in Indonesian politics at that time were:

1. The nationalist Indonesian National Party (PNI).
2. The religious Nahdlatul Ulama (NU).
3. The communist Indonesian Communist Party (PKI).

Nasakom then grew the PKI in Indonesia and defeated the other parties. Sukarno gradually moved closer to the PKI and the Indonesian Air Force in an attempt to strengthen his position in competition with Nasakom. In March 1960, Sukarno dissolved Parliament after it rejected the budget. In June, the Mutual Cooperation – People's Representative Council (Dewan Perwakilan Rakyat Gotong Royong, DPR-GR) and the Provisional People's Representative Council (MPRS) were established, with the armed services and police represented as functional groups, and PKI chairman D.N. Aidit as deputy chairman. The PKI is estimated to have occupied 17–25% of the seats in the DPR-GR and was now represented in every state body except the Cabinet. Despite the fears and warnings from regional military commanders of Pro-PKI measures, Sukarno repeatedly defended the idea as a way to balance and harmonize the diverse political ideologies in the country. Sukarno explicitly asserted that Nasakom was the embodiment of Pancasila and the 1945 Constitution (UUD 1945) in political practice. In his Independence Day speech on 17 August 1961, Sukarno proclaimed:

"Whoever agrees to Pancasila, must agree to Nasakom; Who does not agree to Nasakom, actually does not agree to the Pancasila! Now I add: Whoever agrees to the 1945 Constitution must agree to Nasakom; whoever does not agree to Nasakom, actually does not agree with the 1945 Constitution!"

— Sukarno

Sukarno even campaigned for the Nasakom concept to international forums. He offered the principle of Pancasila's tolerance for world peace, which at that time was divided between the Western bloc and the Eastern bloc. In the General Assembly of the United Nations (UN) on 30 September 1960 in New York, Sukarno delivered a speech entitled "To Build the World a New". Through this speech, Sukarno conveyed the Nasakom concept that he made.

All newspapers, the only radio station (RRI, government-run), and the only television station (TVRI, also government-run) were made into "tools of the revolution" and functioned to spread Sukarno's messages. At the time, banners proclaiming glory to Nasakom were abundant and decorated throughout Jakarta's streets. In one incident where "Kom" was struck out, Sukarno vehemently declared on RRI, "Whoever is mischievously removing the word 'Kom,' bring them before me, let me give them a thrashing!"

=== CONEFO ===
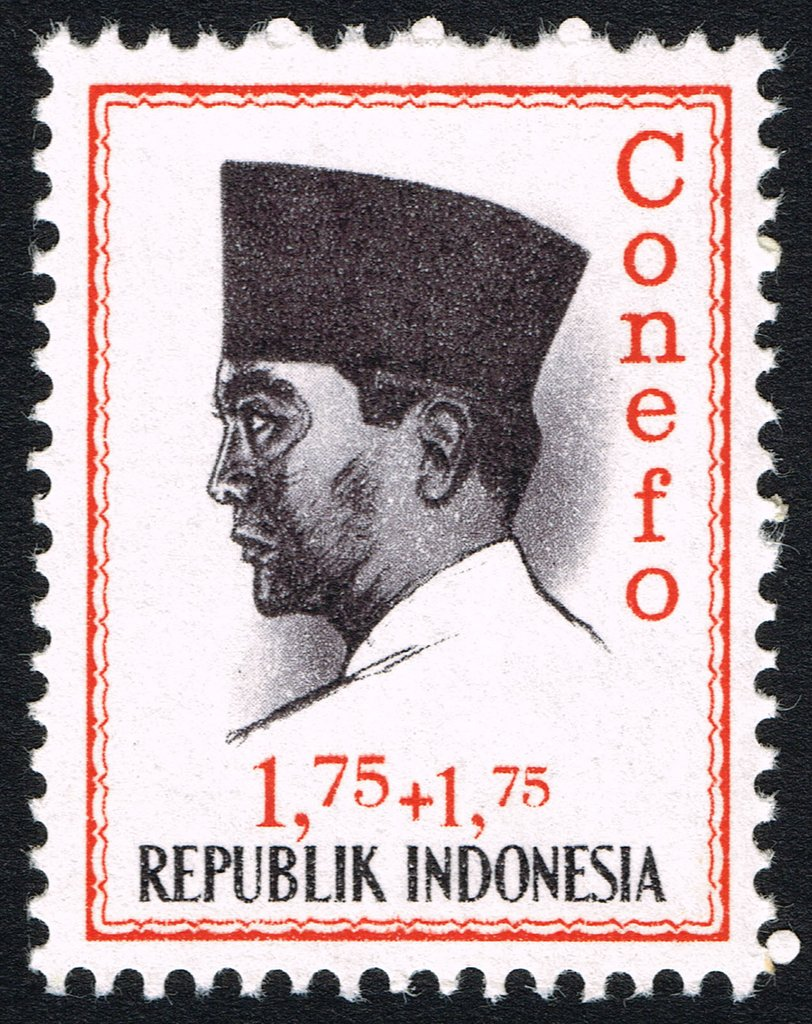
CONEFO commemorative stamp

After Indonesia left the United Nations, Sukarno established a new bloc of "emerging nations" that would serve as an alternative power center to the United Nations. Sukarno at the time regarded CONEFO as a form of a Nasakom International, as the CONEFO conference was seen as a platform to bring together all progressive forces, whether from nationalist, religious, communist, or other anti-imperialist groups.

In a speech commemorating the anniversary of the Communist Party of Indonesia and later speeches, Sukarno highlighted the establishment of the CONEFO organization as one of the political advantages stemming from Nasakom. Sukarno then called for unity and collaboration among all segments of Indonesian society to support the construction and success of CONEFO, portraying it as a significant step towards realizing the ideals of Nasakom on an international scale. Emphasizing that the success of CONEFO would demonstrate the greatness and advantages of Nasakom, Sukarno asserted that Nasakom must serve as an exemplar for Asian nations dedicated to the continued fight against imperialism. The Department of Information later emphasized that CONEFO, as a means and tool of struggle, must be fought for as there were still one or two countries in Asia-Africa that did fully comprehend the essence of Nasakom and that CONEFO served as a vehicle to dismantle imperialism.

== Failure of Nasakom ==
Sukarno was very keen to expand his Nasakom idea. However, the concept eventually failed. Indonesia's political situation became uncertain after six generals were assassinated in what is known as the 30 September Movement (G30S) in 1965. The masses from KAMI (Indonesian Students Action Front) and KAPPI (Indonesian Youths and Students Action Front) held demonstrations and delivered the Tri Tuntutan Rakyat (Tritura), one of which requested that the PKI be dissolved. Holding onto what was left of his power after the attempted coup, Sukarno refused to dissolve the PKI because it contradicted the Nasakom view. Sukarno's refusal to disband the PKI weakened his position in politics, eventually leading to the signing of supersemar. Even when his influence began to fade, in the All-Indonesia Panca Tunggal session at the State Palace, Jakarta, on 23 October 1965, Sukarno reiterated the importance of Nasakom.

"Ik ben nasionalist, ik ben islamiet, socialist. Tiga in one. Three in one! [... ] I am the very feeling of Nasakom!"

— Sukarno,

The end of Nasakom was caused by the decline of the PKI's prestige due to the 30 September Movement. In addition, the end of Nasakom was also caused by the transition of power from the Old Order to the New Order, where Indonesia's new leader, Suharto, was strongly anti-communist. Thus, the idea of Nasakom came to an end.
