= Ni Zhiqin =

Chinese high jumper

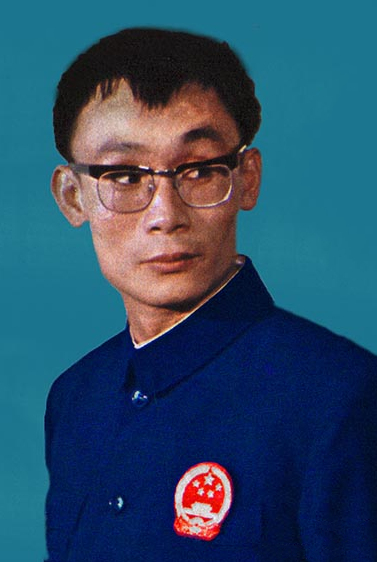
- Ni Zhiqin at the 1974 Asian Games

Personal information
- Born: 14 April 1942 (age 84) Quanzhou, China

Sport
- Sport: Athletics
- Event: High jump

Achievements and titles
- Personal best: 2.29 m (1970)
Medal record
Representing China
Asian Games
| Silver medal – second place | 1974 Tehran | High jump |

Ni Zhiqin (Chinese: 倪志钦; pinyin: Ní Zhìqīn; born 14 April 1942) often referred to as Ni Chih-Chin, is a retired Chinese high jumper.

He is known for breaking the world record with 2.29 m on 8 November 1970 in Changsha, but because PR China was not a member of the International Association of Athletics Federations at the time, his record was never ratified.

== International competition ==
| Year | Competition | Venue | Position | Notes |
|---|---|---|---|---|
| 1963 | GANEFO | Jakarta, Indonesia | 1st | 2.01 |
| 1965 | Chinese National Games | Beijing, PR China | 1st | 2.15 |
| 1966 | GANEFO | Phnom Penh, Cambodia | 1st | 2.27 |
| 1974 | Asian Games | Tehran, Iran | 2nd | 2.15 |
