= David Bonderman =

American billionaire businessman (1942–2024)

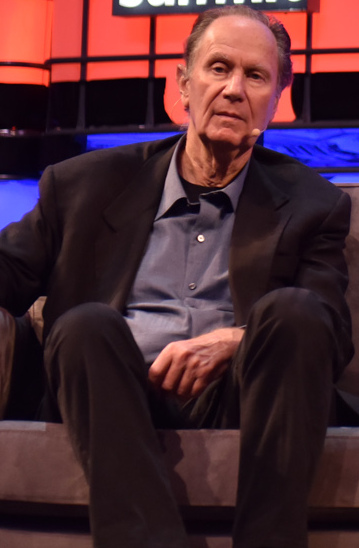
- Bonderman in 2016
- Born: November 27, 1942; Los Angeles, California, U.S.
- Died: December 11, 2024 (aged 82); Los Angeles, California, U.S.
- Education: University of Washington (BA); Harvard University (JD)
- Occupation: Businessman
- Known for: Co-founder, TPG Capital (formerly Texas Pacific Group); Minority owner, Boston Celtics; Co-founder/co-majority owner, Seattle Kraken
- Spouse: Laurie Michaels
- Partner: Christa Campbell (from 2019)
- Children: 5

David Bonderman (November 27, 1942 – December 11, 2024) was an American billionaire businessman. He was the founding partner of TPG Inc. (formerly Texas Pacific Group), and its Asian affiliate, Newbridge Capital. He was also one of the minority owners of the NBA's Boston Celtics as well as the co-founder and co-majority owner (along with Jerry Bruckheimer) of the Seattle Kraken of the National Hockey League. At the time of his death, Forbes estimated his net worth at US$7.4 billion, making him the 400th richest person in the world.

== Early life and education ==
Bonderman was born to a Jewish family, in Los Angeles on November 27, 1942, and was educated there at University High School. Bonderman studied Russian at the University of Washington, where he graduated Phi Beta Kappa in 1963, and at Harvard Law School, where he graduated magna cum laude in 1966. He was also a member of the Harvard Law Review and a Sheldon Fellow. During his time at Harvard, he traveled to Cairo, Egypt, to study Islamic jurisprudence and law; consequently, he became known in various Islamic legal circles, ultimately developing a near-native fluency in Modern Standard Arabic. Bonderman began providing the funding for the Bonderman Travel Fellowship at the University of Washington in 1995 which gives eight undergraduate and six graduate students per year with the opportunity to travel the world independently, with very little structure or regulations. In 2013, Bonderman's daughter, Samantha Holloway, donated the funding to create a similar fellowship at the University of Michigan. While the fellowships share the same name (the Bonderman Fellowship), they vary in both eligibility and execution.

== Career ==
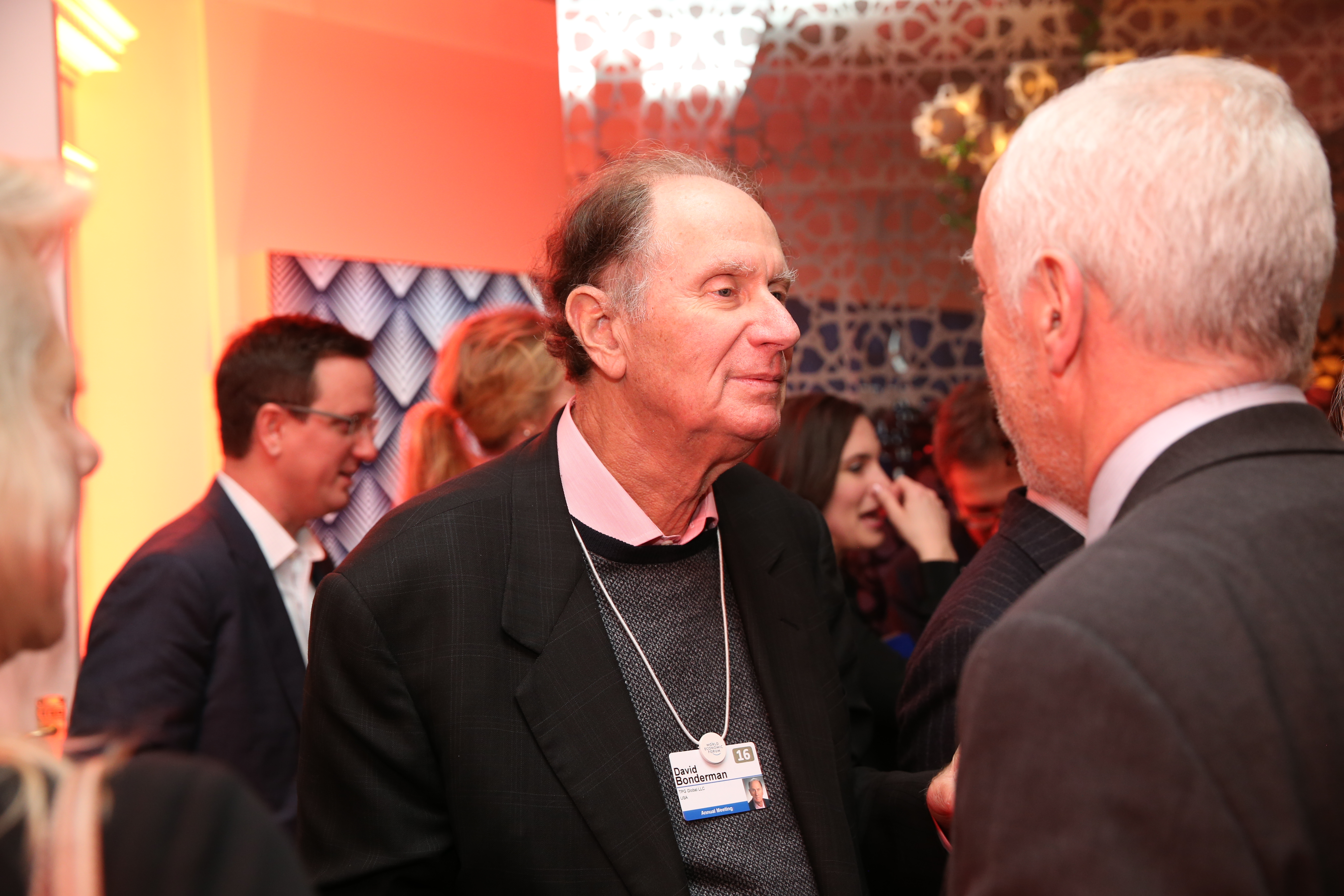
Bonderman at the 2016 World Economic Forum Annual Meeting in Davos, Switzerland

Bonderman was an assistant professor at Tulane University Law School during 1967 and 1968; he then was a special assistant to the United States Attorney General during 1968 and 1969. In 1971, he joined the law firm of Arnold & Porter in Washington, D.C., where he became a partner and specialized in corporate, securities, bankruptcy and antitrust litigation. In 1983, he joined the Robert M. Bass Group, Inc. (RMBG), an investment company of Robert Bass which now does business as Keystone Inc., and became the chief operating officer. Bonderman was a principal at TPG in Fort Worth, Texas, from December 1992, where he was also co-founder and chairman. TPG went public in January 2022, trading on the NASDAQ under the ticker symbol "TPG".

In 2008, Bonderman was named as one of the investors of what became the T-Mobile Arena in Las Vegas.

Bonderman was a director of Continental Airlines, Bell & Howell, Ducati, Credicom Asia, the Education Corporation of America, Beringer Vineyards, Carr Realty, Virgin Cinemas, CoStar Group, Gemalto, and Ryanair. He was on the boards of The Wilderness Society, the Grand Canyon Trust, the World Wide Fund for Nature, The University of Washington Foundation and the American Himalayan Foundation. He previously was on the boards of Washington Mutual, American Savings Bank, Denbury Resources and Burger King. He was a board member of Uber until he resigned from that position in June 2017.

In June 2017, Bonderman resigned from the board of Uber amidst controversy surrounding a sexist response to fellow board member Arianna Huffington during a company all-hands meeting. "There's a lot of data that shows when there's one woman on the board, it's much more likely that there will be a second woman on the board," said Huffington. Bonderman replied, "actually, what it shows is that it's much more likely to be more talking." The Uber meeting was, among other things, slated to discuss efforts to rein in a toxic and sexist culture at the company.

In 2018, Bonderman filed an application for a National Hockey League (NHL) expansion team to play at a renovated Climate Pledge Arena in Seattle, Washington. The NHL Board of Governors voted to approve the team, named the Seattle Kraken, on December 4.

=== Wildcat, Infinity Q, Velissaris ===
Wildcat Capital Management was originally Bonderman's family office. In early 2019, a mutual fund named Infinity Q Diversified Alpha Fund had reportedly said on its website that the "investment team and control functions are largely the same for both Wildcat and Infinity Q." Wildcat also reportedly had $100 million invested in the fund. Infinity Q had been founded in 2014. In early 2021, the $1.7 billion Infinity Q fund suspended redemptions, the SEC was investigating asset valuations and the chief investment officer, James Velissaris, had been placed on administrative leave. Leonard Potter, Infinity Q's non-executive chairman and owner of Wildcat, was designated to take over Infinity Q's management. Wildcat "managed more than $3 billion at the end of 2019, including capital from Bonderman." In February 2021, SEC charged Velissaris in a fraudulent scheme to overvalue assets held by the Infinity Q Diversified Alpha mutual fund and the Infinity Q Volatility Alpha private fund. According to the complaint, Velissaris collected more than $26 million through fraudulent conduct, deceived SEC staff by creating backdated minutes non-existent valuation meetings, and altering valuation policy documents. The United States Attorney's Office for the Southern District of New York announced criminal charges against Velissaris, and the Commodity Futures Trading Commission (CFTC) announced parallel civil charges against him.

In April 2021, The Wall Street Journal analyzed specific valuation problems in the fund portfolios and received some comment on them. It also reported an apparent loss of $500 million in the fund, bringing valuation to $1.2 billion, and some discussion of the loss. Velissaris was identified as having been majority owner and in control of the fund with Bonderman family investment interests as passive investors in it. Infinity Q was expected to present a plan to distribute funds to investors by May 24, the report concluded.

== Personal life and death ==
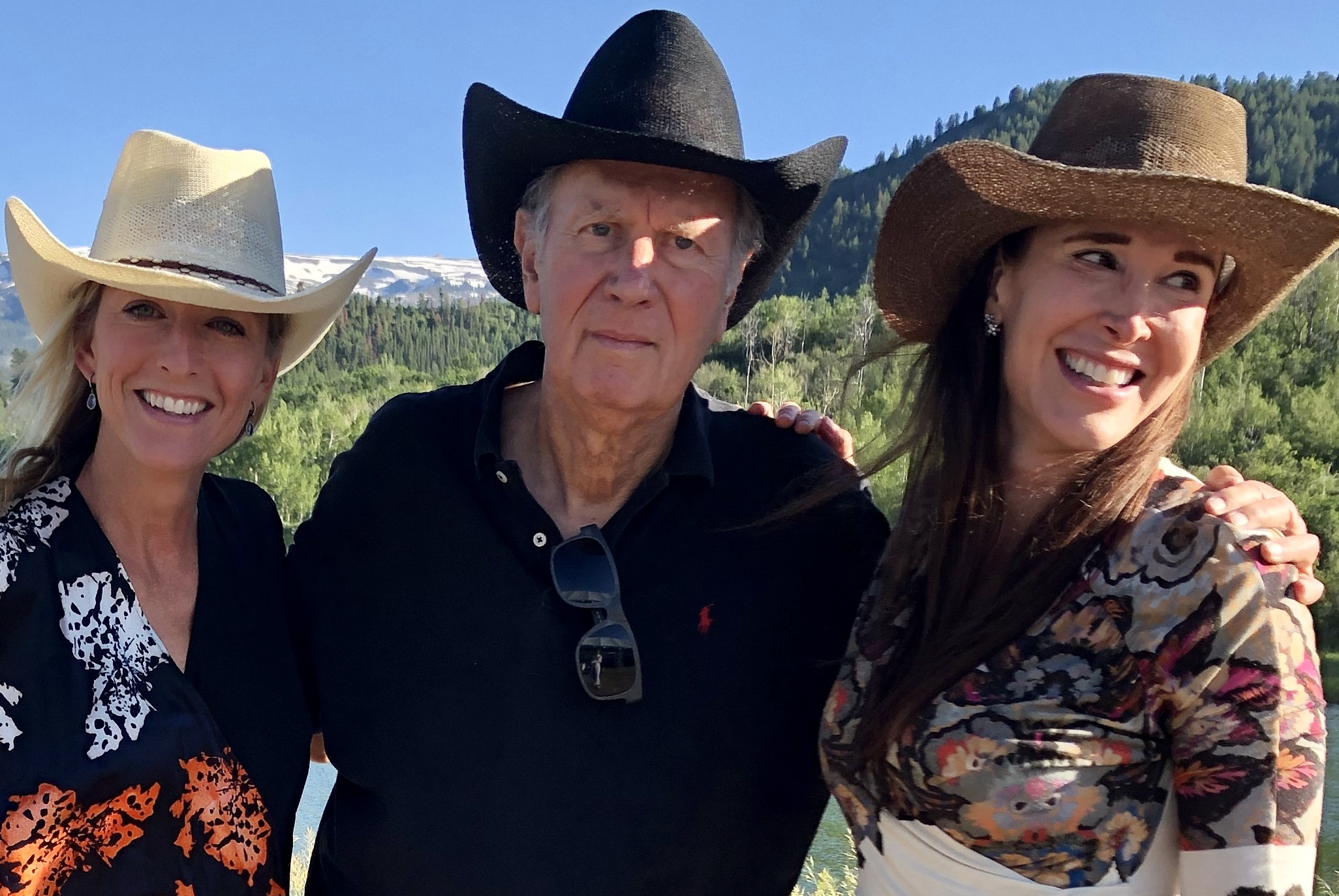
Bonderman with Karen B. Brooks (right) and Alexa L. Wesner (left) in 2019

Bonderman was married to Laurie Michaels; they had five children, and lived in Fort Worth, Texas. He was reported to be in a relationship with Christa Campbell in February and May 2019 though he stayed married with Michaels.

In 2002, for his 60th birthday, Bonderman had The Rolling Stones and John Mellencamp play at his birthday party at The Theater at Hard Rock Hotel and Casino in Las Vegas. John Mellencamp played for an hour, The Rolling Stones played for an hour and a half, and comedian Robin Williams entertained guests between acts. The party cost $7 million, making it one of the most expensive private concerts ever held.

In 2012, for his 70th birthday party, Bonderman held a private concert by former The Beatles member Paul McCartney at Wynn Las Vegas for 1,020 guests. Robin Williams also performed a comedy routine. Bonderman donated $1000 to each guest's charity of choice.

Bonderman died in Los Angeles, on December 11, 2024, at the age of 82. In tribute, the Seattle Kraken added a "Bondo" (Bonderman's nickname) patch to its jerseys and a matching sticker to its helmets on December 12.

His daughter Samantha Holloway succeeded him as owner of the Kraken, and she created the umbrella brand called One Roof Sports & Entertainment with Kraken CEO Tod Leiweke in 2026.

== Awards and honors ==
- 1999: Golden Plate Award of the American Academy of Achievement
- 2004: The M&A Advisor Hall of Fame
- 2016: Woodrow Wilson Award for Corporate Citizenship
- 2017: Texas Business Hall of Fame

Sporting positions
New creation	Seattle Kraken principal owner 2021–2024; Served alongside: Tod Leiweke and Jerry Bruckheimer	Succeeded by Samantha Holloway
