= Indonesia Accuses =

1930 speech by future Indonesian President Sukarno

Indonesia Accuses (Indonesian: Indonesia Menggugat) is a speech read by future President of Indonesia Sukarno in his defense during his 1930 trial in Landraad, Bandung, Indonesia. Sukarno, along with Gatot Mangkupraja and Maskun Supriadinata, was accused of trying to overthrow the colonial government of the Dutch East Indies and thrown in jail. All three were founders of the Indonesian National Party (PNI). While in prison, Sukarno wrote the speech, which condemned international political conditions and the destruction of Indonesian society under colonial rule, making the speech a landmark political document against colonialism and imperialism.
