= Athletics at the 1963 GANEFO =

I GANEFO
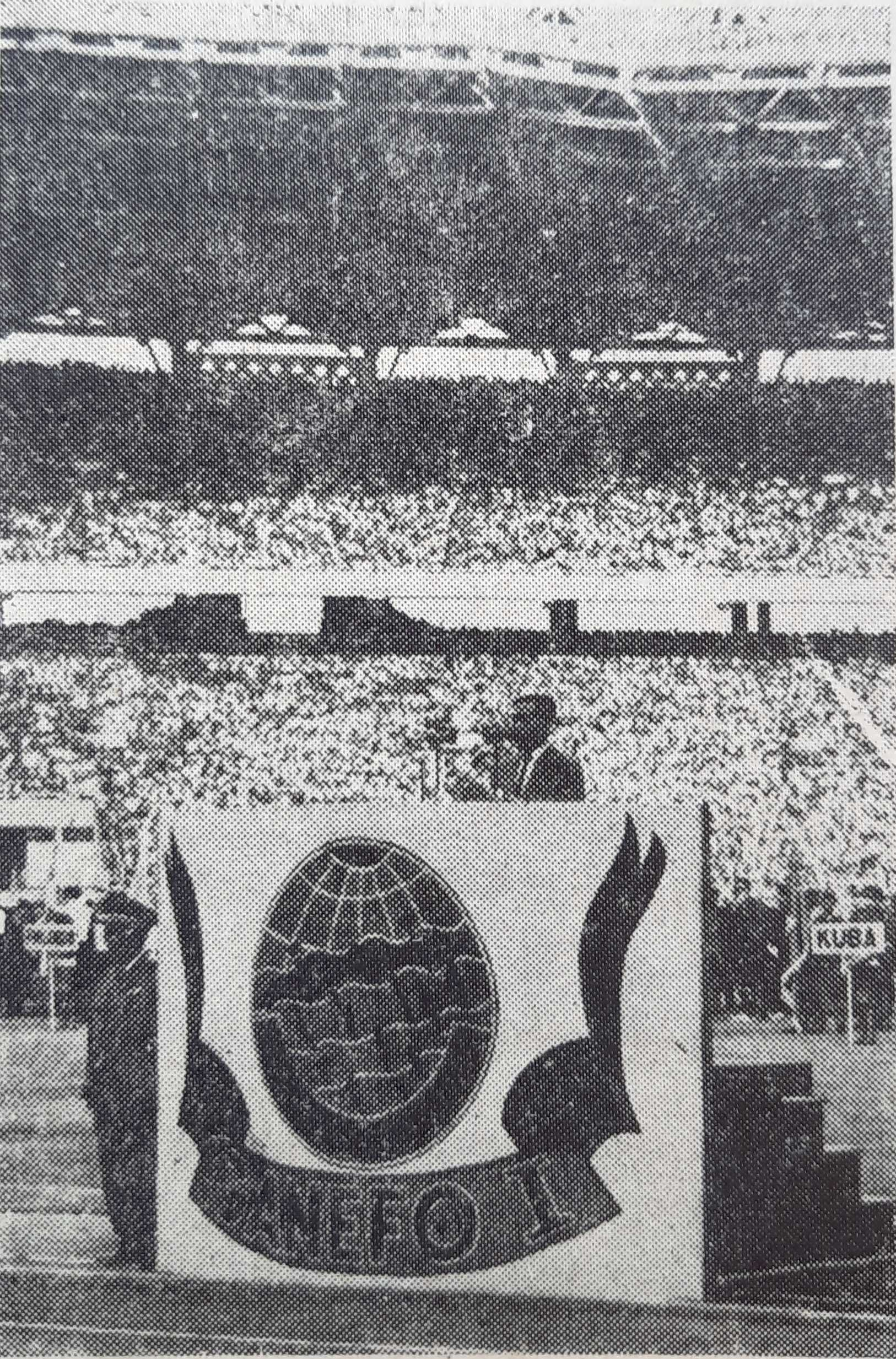
- Dates: November 1963
- Host city: Jakarta, Indonesia
- Events: 33

At the 1963 GANEFO, the athletics events were held in Jakarta, Indonesia in November. A total of 21 men's and 12 women's athletics events were contested at the competition.

Given that the Soviet Union sent a lower standard of athletes to the games, China dominated the athletics competition. China won all but three of the women's events and won eleven gold medals in the men's section. The second most successful nation was North Korea, which won four gold medals, led by a triple gold medal performance by Sin Kim-dan. The next most successful nation was the United Arab Republic (combining Egypt and Syria), which swept the men's distance track events, and also won four gold medals.

This was a major international event for Chinese and North Korean athletes in particular, as they were excluded from the Asian Games, including the 1962 Jakarta Games held a year earlier. The Asian Games sprint and hurdles champion Mohammad Sarengat by China's Gao Jiqiao. Ni Zhiqin won the men's high jump and would break the world record in that event later in his career. His counterpart on the women's side Zheng Fengrong was similarly successful, having become the first Chinese world record breaker in 1957 – here she was only runner-up (behind her teammate Wu Fushan) but won the women's pentathlon event. Another high-profile competitor was men's long jump winner Ali Brakchi, an Algerian who represented France at the 1960 Summer Olympics.

== Medal summary ==
=== Men ===
Event	Gold		Silver		Bronze	
100 metres	Liu Changfung (CHN)	10.7	Khum Khen (CAM)	10.8	Chen Jiaquan (CHN)	10.8
200 metres	Jootje Oroh (INA)	21.8	Chen Jiaquan (CHN)	21.9	Khum Khen (CAM)	21.9
400 metres	Liang Shiqiang (CHN)	49.5	Taisto Salminen (FIN)	49.8	M. Aminuddin (INA)	50.3
800 metres	Nabil Hassan (EGY)	1:52.3	Joo Hoon-Hi (PRK)	1:54.5	Keijo Ceder (FIN)	1:55.9
1500 metres	Nabil Hassan (EGY)	4:00.8	Kang Hyong-Man (PRK)	4:00.9	Yin Fengwu (CHN)	4:02.9
5000 metres	Youssef Abdel Saoud (EGY)	14:57.5	Pak Yong-Ho (PRK)	14:58.8	Saïd Gerouani Benmoha (MAR)	15:08.2
10,000 metres	Youssef Abdel Saoud (EGY)	31:05.2	Saïd Gerouani Benmoha (MAR)	31:09.0	Lesnussa (INA) Rachid (TUN)	32:51.1
Marathon	Chun Man-Hyung (PRK)	2:49:51	Hwang Kwang-Duk (PRK)	2:49:52	Ismail Abidin (INA)	3:01:41
110 m hurdles	Gao Jiqiao (CHN)	14.3	Mohammed Sarengat (INA)	14.6	Abdel Moneim Abdallah (EGY)	14.8
400 m hurdles	Liang Shiqiang (CHN)	52.5	Abdel Moneim Abdallah (EGY)	53.7	Tage Törn (FIN)	54.9
4 × 100 m relay	Indonesia (INA); Jootje Oroh; Soenjoto; Mohammad Sarengat; Bambang Wahyudi	41.8	China (CHN)	41.9	Cambodia (CAM)	43.4
4 × 400 m relay	Indonesia (INA); M. Aminuddin; Agus Soegiri; Steve Mainake; Steven Thenu	3:20.6	Philippines (PHI)	3:21.3	Cambodia (CAM)	3:27.3
High jump	Ni Zhiqin (CHN)	2.01 m	Kang Jupei (CHN)	1.99 m	Ciriaco Baronda (PHI)	1.90 m
Pole vault	Hu Zurong (CHN)	4.40 m	Cai Yishu (CHN)	4.30 m	Mohammed Abdullah (IRQ)	4.00 m
Long jump	Ali Brakchi (ALG)	7.51 m	Zhang Qishan (CHN)	7.36 m	Teymourlenk Shoukri (EGY)	7.31 m
Triple jump	Tian Zhaozhong (CHN)	16.04 m	Gu Keyan (CHN)	15.87 m	Teymourlenk Shoukri (EGY)	14.73 m
Shot put	He Yongxian (CHN)	17.02 m	He Zhengsheng (CHN)	15.73 m	Ramazan Driza (ALB)	15.10 m
Discus throw	Sun Jiuyuan (CHN)	48.42 m	Chang Dexiang (CHN)	47.57 m	Ramazan Driza (ALB)	43.92 m
Hammer throw	Li Yunbiao (CHN)	62.33 m	Merouane Bitar (SYR)	51.02 m	He Yungxien (CHN)	50.84 m
Javelin throw	Ma Changlu (CHN)	66.71 m	J. Gusti Ngurah Manik (INA)	65.53 m	Ma Facheng (CHN)	62.57 m
Decathlon	Mohammed Abdullah (IRQ)	5900 pts	Abdul Rab Khan (INA)	5807 pts	Noriel Roa (PHI)	4954 pts

=== Women ===
Event	Gold		Silver		Bronze	
100 metres	Liu Xingyu (CHN)	12.4	Liu Yuying (CHN)	12.5	Takuko Inokuchi (JPN)	12.6
200 metres	Sin Kim-dan (PRK)	23.5	Chin Yihing (CHN)	25.8	Willy Tomasoa (INA)	26.8
400 metres	Sin Kim-dan (PRK)	51.4	Jiang Yumin (CHN)	57.7	Souratmi (INA)	58.8
800 metres	Sin Kim-dan (PRK)	1:59.1	Liu Chunbing (CHN)	2:18.4	Suwatini (INA)	2:20.0
80 m hurdles	Liu Yuying (CHN)	11.4	Ye Lifang (CHN)	11.8	Ernawati (INA)	12.5
4 × 100 m relay	China (CHN)	48.2	Indonesia (INA); Ernawati; Souratmi; Willy Tomasoa; W. Machwijar	50.5	Cambodia (CAM)	52.6
High jump	Wu Fushan (CHN)	1.70 m	Zheng Fengrong (CHN)	1.68 m	Oh Sung-Hwan (PRK)	1.58 m
Long jump	Xiao Jieping (CHN)	5.74 m	Kang Yueli (CHN)	5.51 m	Ni Luh Armoni Widari (INA)	5.45 m
Shot put	Chong Xiuyun (CHN)	15.25 m	Chao Yung (CHN)	14.47 m	Ri Soo-Hak (PRK)	13.37 m
Discus throw	Chao Yung (CHN)	47.17 m	Wang Shiyu (CHN)	46.00 m	Ri Ko-Choon (PRK)	44.13 m
Javelin throw	Dong He (CHN)	47.32 m	Flora Karmomjanen (INA)	39.45 m	Jeanne Toar (INA)	39.31 m
Pentathlon	Zheng Fengrong (CHN)	4525 pts	Wu Yunxin (CHN)	3616 pts	Ni Luh Armoni Widari (INA)	3407 pts
