= Karen B. Brooks =

American diplomat

Karen B. Brooks is a former U.S. diplomat who served in the administrations of Presidents Bill Clinton and George W. Bush. She is a senior advisor for private equity fund TPG Capital and an adjunct senior fellow for Asia at the Council on Foreign Relations in New York, where she has published on a range of topics, including on the economies of Indonesia and the Philippines.

Brooks writes and comments frequently about Southeast Asian politics and policy in U.S. and international media outlets.

== Early life and education ==
Brooks was raised on Eastern Long Island. She received a fellowship to teach in Indonesia after earning an undergraduate degree at Princeton University, and learned Mandarin in China on a fellowship from Cornell University, after completing her master's degree there. She speaks Indonesian, Javanese, Mandarin and Thai. She currently lives in Aspen, Colorado.

== Career ==
Brooks has had a long career in Asia, including lecturing at universities, democracy building and conflict resolution work with the United States Agency for International Development (USAID), policy-making with the U.S. government, advisory work with Fortune 500 companies, and direct investing with private equity and hedge funds.

Brooks served at the U.S. Department of State during the second term of President Clinton, first as special advisor to the Assistant Secretary for East Asian and Pacific Affairs and then leading the Asia portfolio on Secretary Madeline Albright's Policy Planning Staff.

She also advised then U.S. Ambassador to the United Nations (UN) Richard Holbrooke on Indonesia and East Timor, including participation in a special session of the UN Security Council on the East Timor crisis in 1999.

From 2001 to 2004, Brooks served under National Security Advisor Condoleezza Rice as the Director for Asian Affairs at the White House National Security Council (NSC), where she was a leading architect of U.S. policy toward Southeast Asia. In May 2002, she traveled with President Clinton and other US dignitaries as part of the United States official delegation to the celebration of East Timor's independence from UN stewardship.

Known for her deep contacts in Jakarta, Manila and Bangkok, Brooks was frequently dispatched by the White House to Southeast Asia for sensitive negotiations during her time at the NSC. Terrorism related issues were central to many of these missions, including secret meetings with then Indonesian President Megawati Sukarnoputri that were focused on efforts to prevent terrorist attacks. At the time, Brooks was said to have a deep, personal and professional relationship with then President of Indonesia Megawati Sukarnoputri.

Brooks is an expert on the Aceh province in Indonesia, an area where she lived and served during her time with USAID in 1995 and as an election monitor in 1997. While serving as Director for Asian Affairs at the NSC she was sent to Jakarta in 2003 to advance a peace process in Aceh, in partnership with the Henri Dunant Center in Geneva.

Following the December 2004 earthquake and tsunami in Aceh, she led negotiations with Indonesian authorities on behalf of the UN World Food Program regarding the entry of humanitarian assistance into the hard-hit province. Her reflections on the experience were published on the front page of the Singapore Straits Times in January 2005.

After leaving the White House in 2004, Brooks launched an advisory firm focusing on helping U.S. multinational companies expand their businesses in Asia. She now works with global private equity firm TPG Capital, including with TPG's social impact investment vehicle, The Rise Fund, where U2 front man Bono sits on the Board. Brooks has many longstanding friends in the region in both the public and private sectors, including Boy Garibaldi Thohir, CEO of Adaro Energy and older brother of Indonesia's current Minister for State Owned Enterprises.

== Philanthropy ==
Following the loss of her mother to brain cancer in 2003, Brooks launched and participated in a series of high-altitude mountain climbs to raise money for cancer research. Funds raised were used to provide grants through the American Association for Cancer Research and the National Brain Tumor Society.

Brooks served on the board of Humane Society International.

== Recent Publications ==
- Indonesia’s Election Exposes Growing Religious Divide, CFR.org, May 22, 2019
- Six Markets to Watch: Indonesia and the Philippines, Foreign Affairs, January 2014
- Is Indonesia Bound for the BRICS?, Foreign Affairs, November 2011
