= CONEFO =

Intergovernmental organization (1965–1966)

Conference of the New Emerging Forces Konferensi Negara-Negara Berkembang (Indonesian)
- Headquarters: Jl. Gatot Subroto, Jakarta, Indonesia
- Type: Intergovernmental organization

Establishment
  - Established: 7 January 1965 (61 years ago)
  - Dissolved: 11 August 1966 (60 years ago)

The Conference of the New Emerging Forces (CONEFO) was an intergovernmental organization that existed from 1965 to 1966. CONEFO was the idea of President Sukarno of Indonesia, which he put forward in a speech at the UN General Assembly on 30 September 1960 entitled "To Build the World Anew" to reform the UN and in early 1965 this idea evolved into creating a new bloc of "emerging countries" that would be an alternative power centre to the United Nations and to the "old-established forces" — a category in which Sukarno included both the United States and the Soviet Union. It was intended to build on the legacy of the 1955 Bandung Conference and the Non-Aligned Movement, which asserted a neutral posture towards the Cold War. But ultimately CONEFO was intended to transcend both movements by establishing an alternative United Nations rooted in the Third World.

== Context ==
CONEFO was intended as an "International Nasakom," an internationalization of Sukarno's united front policy inside Indonesia that balanced nationalist, religious, and communist forces. Surachman, secretary general of Sukarno's PNI, articulated CONEFO's ultimate aims: "Concerning the Conefo proposal of Bung Karno, its success will mean the collapse of the United Nations, and the formation of a new United Nations cleansed of imperialism and its puppets." The PKI leader D. N. Aidit promoted CONEFO in Romania and the Soviet Union. Various states were CONEFO members, including Indonesia, China, the North Korea, North Vietnam, and Cambodia. Other states, like Pakistan, Iraq, and Syria expressed interest, while the Somali defense minister informed reporters that Somalia would play an "active part."

CONEFO was officially established on 7 January 1965, after Sukarno's government objected to Malaysia becoming a non-permanent member of the UN Security Council, at a time of the low-level Indonesia–Malaysia confrontation between the two countries. Sukarno took Indonesia out of the UN (the only country to have done so) and formed a rival world organization, having taken similar steps when he created the Games of the New Emerging Forces (GANEFO) as an alternative to the Olympic Games in 1963.

== Infrastructure ==
Indonesia constructed a new building complex in Jakarta to host CONEFO with financial aid from China. Construction of the CONEFO facilities became Sukarno's "stringent national obsession" throughout the summer of 1965. The eighty-thousand-square-metre (860,000 sq ft) complex, housed near the Bung Karno stadium, would have a 2,500-person conference hall, a building for 3,000 guests, a cultural performance center, six committee buildings, a health center and shopping arcade, and various miscellaneous facilities. Alongside a team of architects and engineers, the PRC provided between $8 million and $16 million for construction of the CONEFO facilities.

== Western concerns ==
Western powers worried about the threat of CONEFO. U.S. diplomats worried that "an alternate UN is [Sukarno's] ultimate goal" and opined: "Fantastic and extravagant as this scheme may seem from a Westerner’s point of view, it reflects the dead seriousness and the relentless drive of Sukarno . . . in his personal war against imperialism." Robert J. Martens, former American diplomat in Jakarta, summarized CONEFO decades later: "For the first time there was going to be a big international conference of New Emerging Forces, and facilities were to be built in Jakarta for this purpose... this kind of rival UN would be formed, based on the East Asian communists and their allies. There were to be other groups in it — a kind of international version of the national front tactic. At a lower plane than the communist core you could have all the Third World nations..." Fears of CONEFO remain an overlooked factor explaining US support for regime change in Indonesia.

== Destruction ==
During the months between General Suharto's capture of power and Sukarno's official removal, Suharto's regime allowed Sukarno to entertain what the CIA described as a "cotter-pin Conefo," a "simple device poked in a hole to keep the creaking machinery... grinding out propaganda as a slave for Sukarno's ego a little while longer, until he permanently passes from the scene." In early 1966, the African-American journalist William Worthy still held out hope that Sukarno would "one day hold his CONEFO conference." But CONEFO never met before it was dissolved on 11 August 1966 by General Suharto after ousting Sukarno from power. Indonesia rejoined the United Nations and the CONEFO complex, now called the MPR/DPR/DPD building, became the seat of the People's Consultative Assembly.
