= GANEFO =

1962–1967 multisports event set up by Indonesia

Games of the New Emerging Forces
- GANEFO seal

- GANEFO flag
- Formation: 1962–1967
- Type: Sporting event organization
- Purpose: To boycott the International Olympic Committee after the suspension of Indonesia from that organisation
- Headquarters: Jakarta, Indonesia
- Members: 51 active members
- Official language: English and host country's official language when necessary
- Federation cofounder: Sukarno; President of Indonesia

The Games of the New Emerging Forces (GANEFO; Indonesian: Pesta Olahraga Negara-Negara Berkembang) were the games set up by Indonesia as a counter to the Olympic Games. Established for the athletes of the so-called "emerging nations" (mainly socialist states and newly independent former colonies), GANEFO was the name given both to the games held in Jakarta in 1963 and the 36-member sporting federation established the same year. A second GANEFO scheduled for Cairo in 1967 was cancelled and GANEFO had only one subsequent event, an "Asian GANEFO" held in Phnom Penh in 1966.

== Sports and politics at GANEFO ==
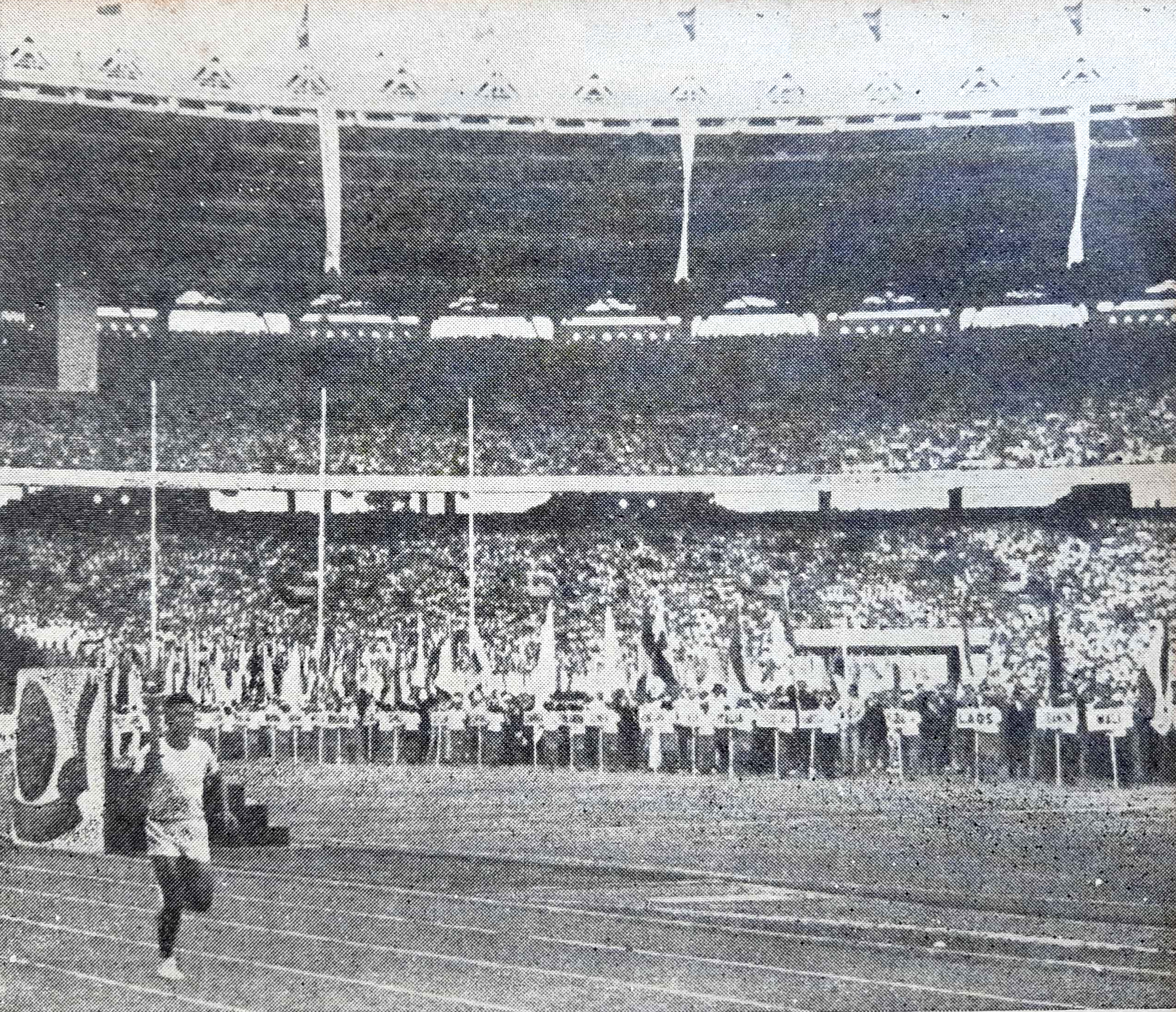
1st GANEFO

Indonesia established GANEFO in the aftermath of IOC censure for the politically charged fourth edition of Asian Games in 1962 in Jakarta which Indonesia hosted and for which Taiwan and Israel were refused entry cards. This ran against the doctrine of the International Olympic Committee, which strove to separate politics from sport. The IOC's eventual reaction was to suspend Indonesia indefinitely from the IOC. Indonesia had “thrown down a challenge to all international amateur sports organizations, which cannot very well be ignored,” in the words of IOC president Avery Brundage. This was the first time the IOC suspended one of its members, although Indonesia was readmitted in time for the 1964 Summer Olympics in Tokyo.

Indonesian president Sukarno responded that the IOC was itself political because it did not have the People's Republic of China or North Vietnam as members; the IOC was simply "a tool of the imperialists and colonialists." In his words: “The International Olympic Games have proved to be openly an imperialistic tool… Now let’s frankly say, sports have something to do with politics. Indonesia proposes now to mix sports with politics, and let us now establish the Games of the New Emerging Forces, the GANEFO… against the Old Established Order.” GANEFO itself would make it clear in its constitution that politics and sport were intertwined. The event was inspired by the anti-Western, anti-colonial movement and the ideas of the 1955 Bandung Conference.

Ten countries (Cambodia, China, Guinea, Indonesia, Iraq, Mali, Pakistan, Vietnam, and the USSR) announced plans to form GANEFO in April 1963, and another 36 signed on as members in November 1963. Despite its doctrine of "separating sports and politics", the IOC nevertheless decreed that the athletes attending GANEFO would be ineligible to participate in the Olympic Games.

Sukarno would later form, with Chinese support, a Conference of New Emerging Forces, or CONEFO (Conference of New Emerging Forces).

== 1st GANEFO ==
1st Games of the New Emerging Forces
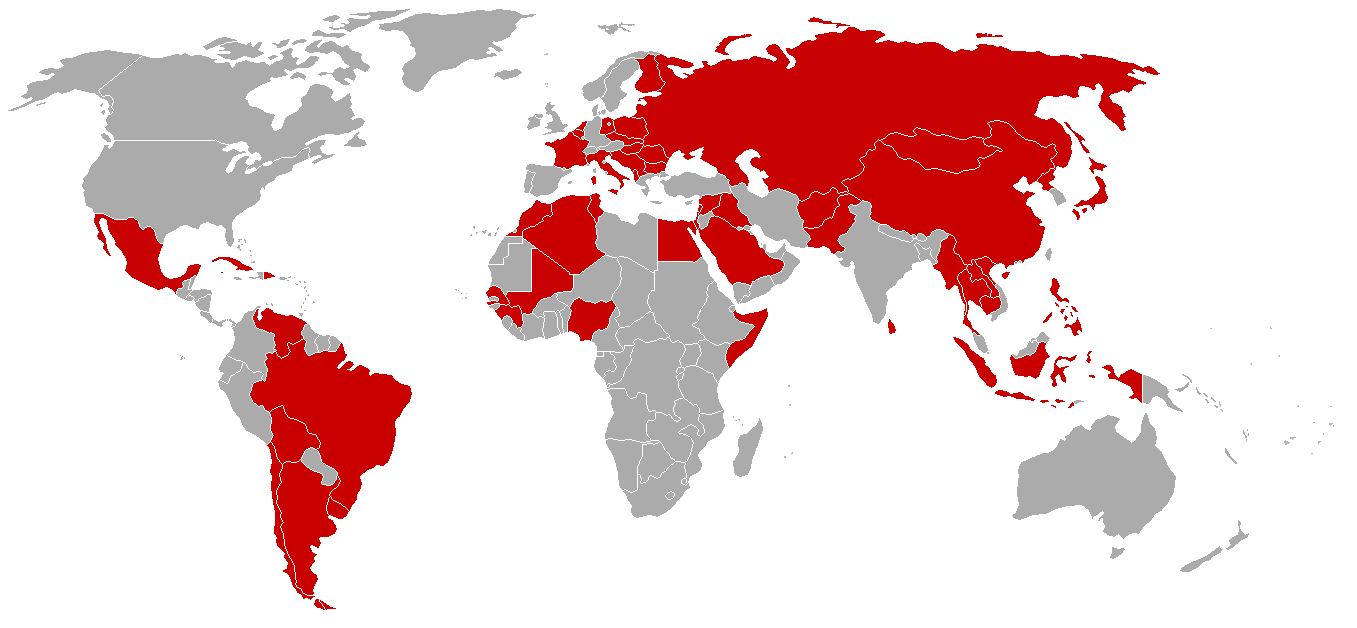
- Participating states
- Host city: Jakarta, Indonesia
- Nations: 51
- Athletes: 2,700
- Opening: 10 November 1963
- Closing: 22 November 1963
- Opened by: Sukarno; President of Indonesia
- Main venue: Gelora Bung Karno Main Stadium

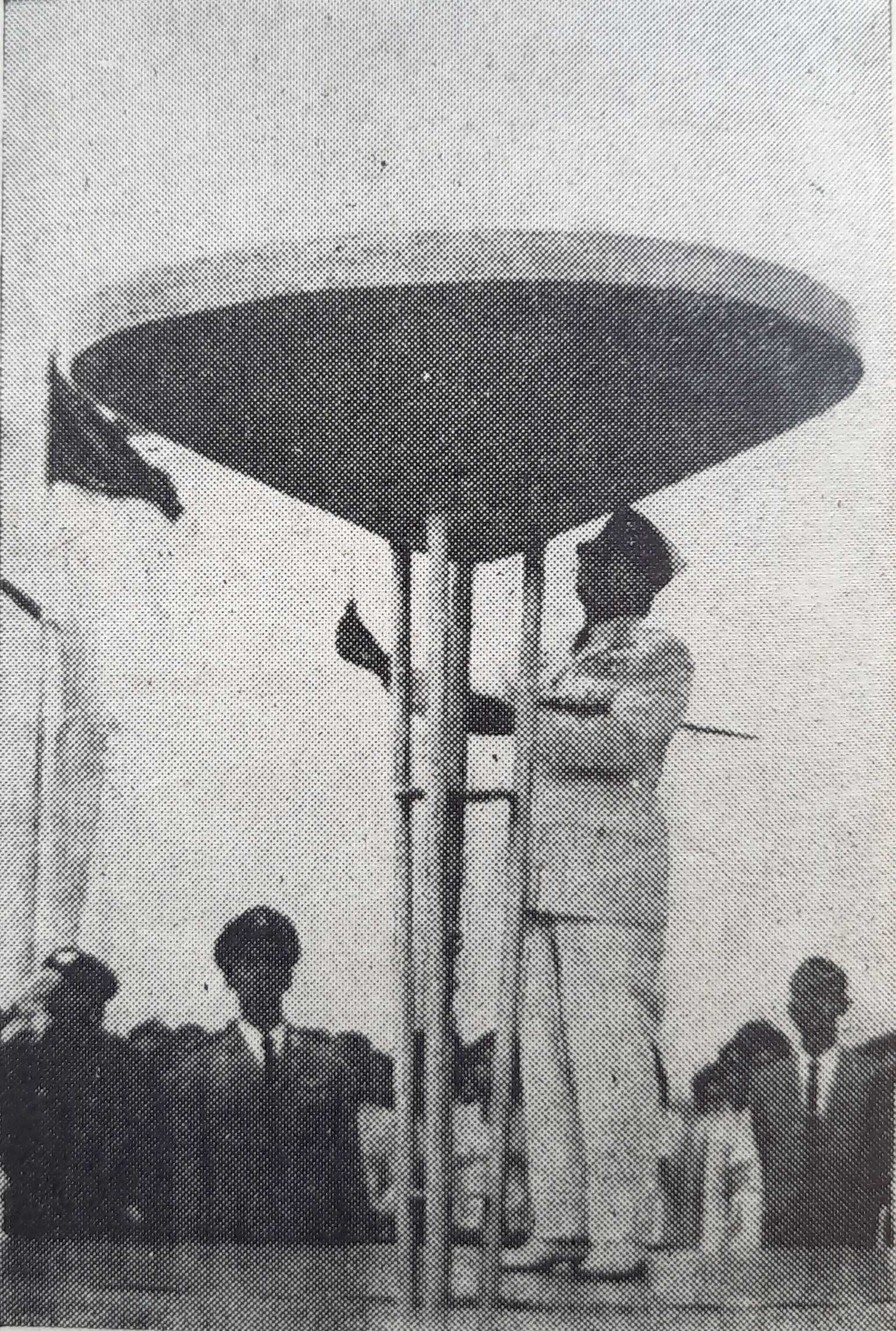
President Sukarno extinguishing the GANEFO flame at the closing ceremony.

=== Participating states in 1st GANEFO ===
The first edition of GANEFO was held in Jakarta, Indonesia, on 10 to 22 November 1963. Athletes from 46 states dispatched about 2,700 athletes and seven nations sent staff and officials. In total, 51 states participated in the Games from Africa, Asia, Europe, and Latin America such as Afghanistan, Albania, Algeria, Argentina, Belgium, Bolivia, Brazil, Bulgaria, Burma, Cambodia, Chile, Ceylon, Cuba, Czechoslovakia, DPR Korea, the Dominican Republic, Finland, France, the German Democratic Republic, Guinea, Hungary, Indonesia, Iraq, Italy, Japan, Laos, Lebanon, Mexico, Mongolia, Morocco, the Netherlands, Nigeria, Pakistan, Palestine (the Jordanian West Bank and the Egyptian Gaza Strip), People's Republic of China, the Philippines, Poland, Republic of Mali, Romania, Saudi Arabia, Senegal, Somalia, Thailand, Tunisia, Soviet Union, Syria, North Vietnam, the United Arab Republic, Uruguay, and Yugoslavia. Unlike the Olympics, there was also a team representing "Arab Palestine."

No country, however, was represented officially by its national Olympics committee, for fear of IOC reprisals. For instance, the Soviet Union, in a show of solidarity, sent athletes to the first GANEFO, but in order not to jeopardise their position in the IOC, the Soviet athletes were not of Olympic calibre. Japan let their athletes of non-Olympic calibre attend the first GANEFO to take account of the host nation's position of 1964 Summer Olympics. Nevertheless, in the lead-up to the first GANEFO, the Japanese NOC did receive a thinly veiled threat from the American IOC president at the time, Avery Brundage, regarding Japanese participation in the first GANEFO.

=== Commemorative stamps ===
A set of eight postage stamps were issued by Indonesia on November 10, 1963 to publicise the GANEFO. China also issued its own commemorative stamp.

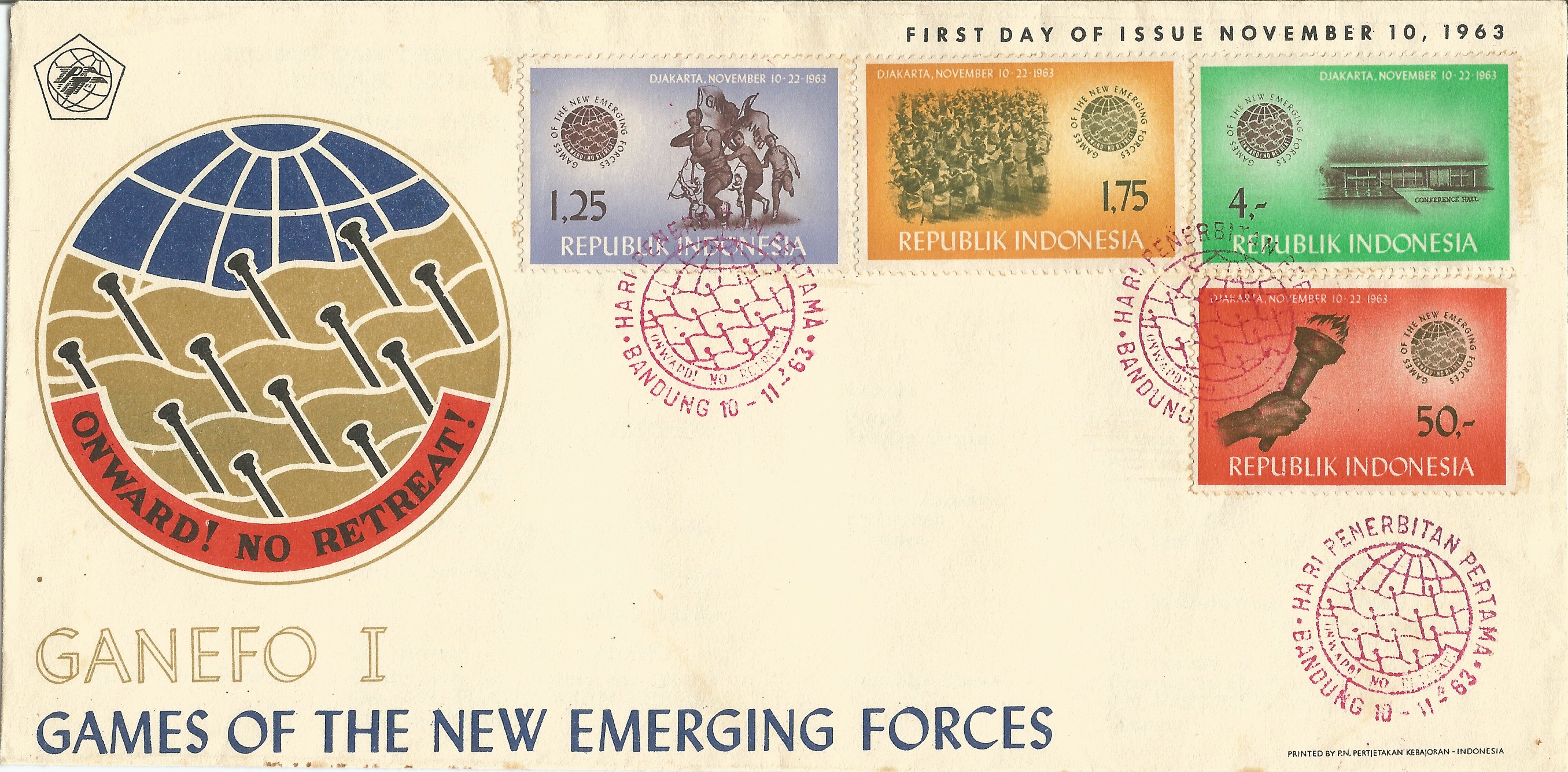

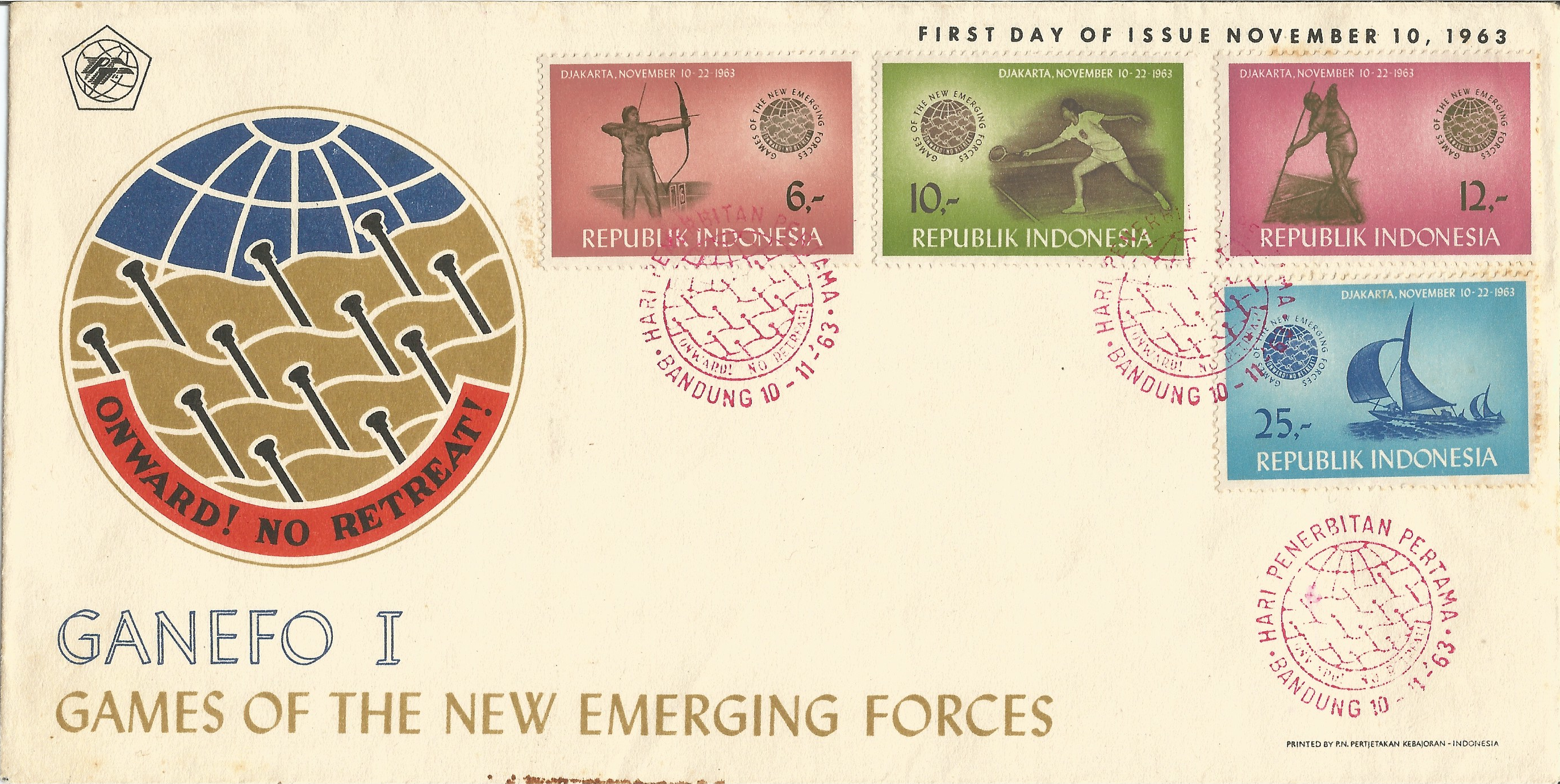

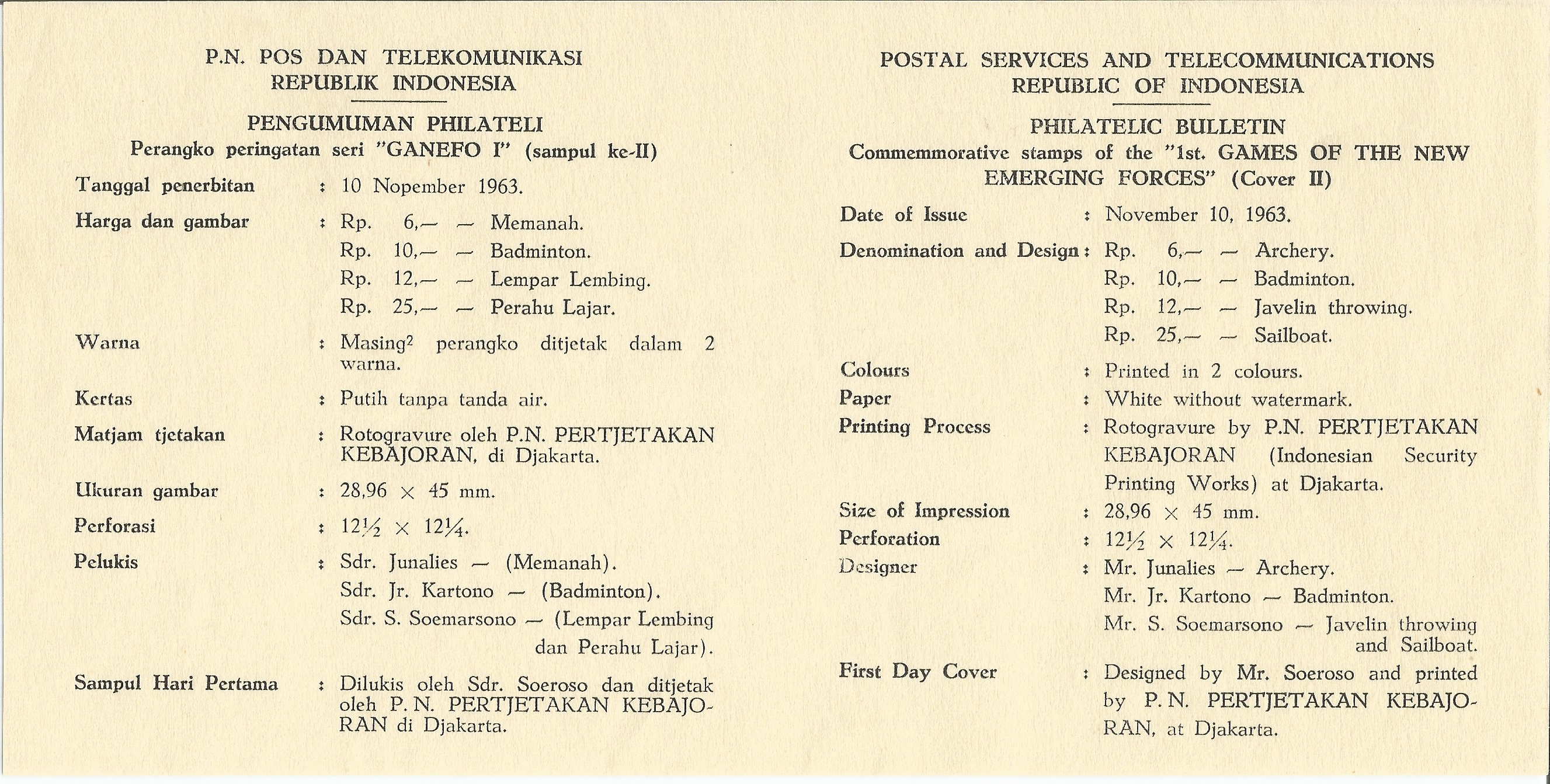

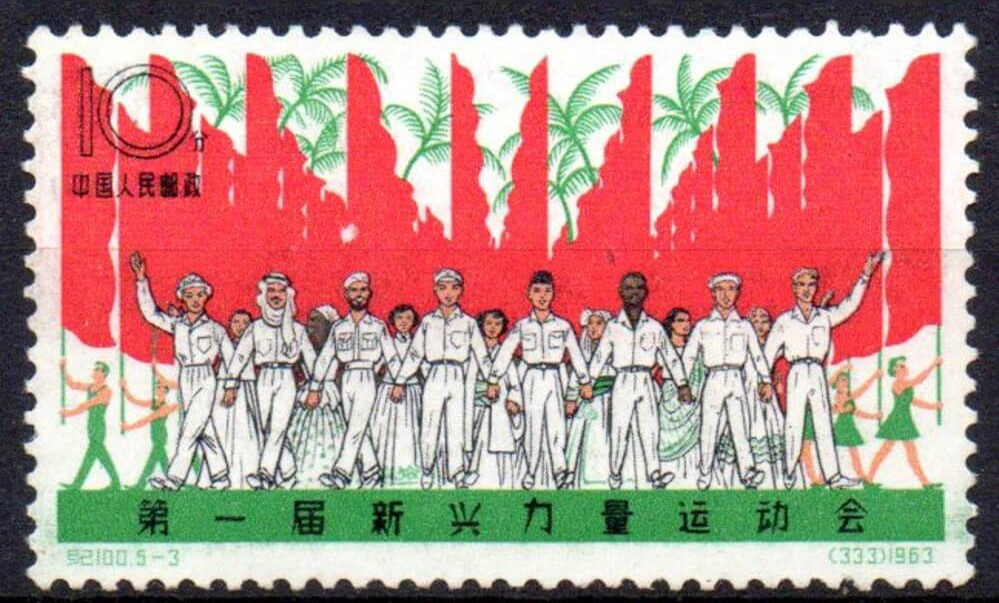

=== Medal table at 1st GANEFO ===
In the first edition of GANEFO, China was the highest-ranking country with 68 gold medals, Soviet Union the second, followed by the United Arab Republic on the third, Indonesia the fourth, and North Korea the fifth. In all, 26 countries reportedly won medals.

* Host nation (Indonesia)

Rank	Nation	Gold	Silver	Bronze	Total
1	China (CHN)	68	58	45	171
2	Soviet Union (URS)	27	21	9	57
3	United Arab Republic (UAR)	22	18	12	52
4	Indonesia (INA)*	21	25	35	81
5	North Korea (PRK)	13	15	24	52
6	Argentina (ARG)	5	0	4	9
7	Japan (JPN)	4	10	14	28
8	Poland (POL)	3	1	2	6
9	Iraq (IRQ)	2	1	3	6
10	Netherlands (NED)	2	0	0	2
11	Cambodia (CAM)	1	5	7	13
12	Pakistan (PAK)	1	3	7	11
13	Lebanon (LBN)	1	2	3	6
14	Syria (SYR)	1	2	2	5
15	Finland (FIN)	1	1	2	4
16	Bulgaria (BUL)	1	1	0	2
17	Algeria (ALG)	1	0	3	4
18	Brazil (BRA)	1	0	0	1
19	Albania (ALB)	0	2	3	5
20	Czechoslovakia (TCH)	0	2	2	4
20	Hungary (HUN)	0	2	2	4
22	Philippines (PHI)	0	1	5	6
23	France (FRA)	0	1	2	3
23	Guinea (GUI)	0	1	2	3
23	Morocco (MAR)	0	1	2	3
26	West Germany (FRG)	0	1	0	1
Totals (26 entries)		175	174	190	539

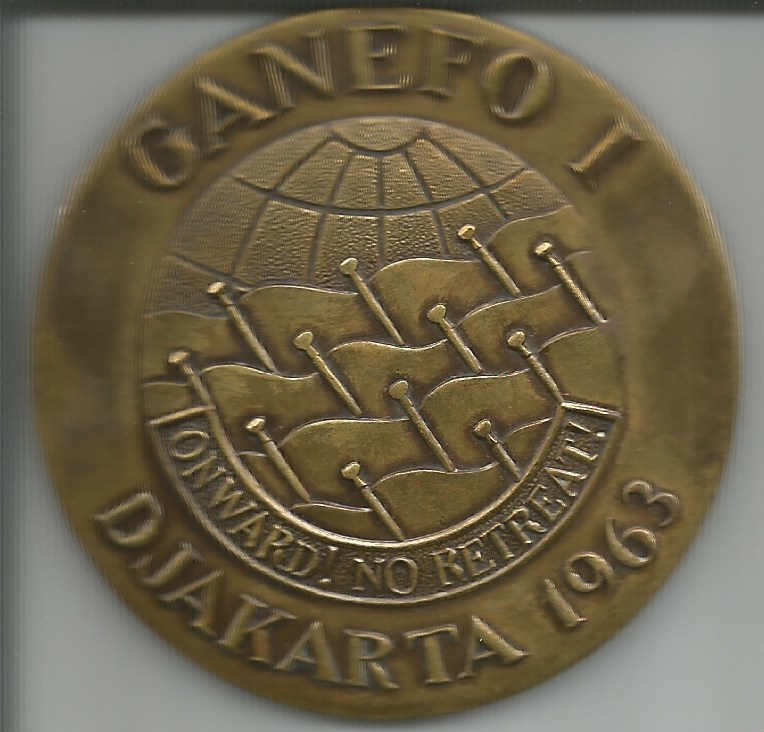
Front of Ganefo Bronze medal for Argentinian Water Polo Team

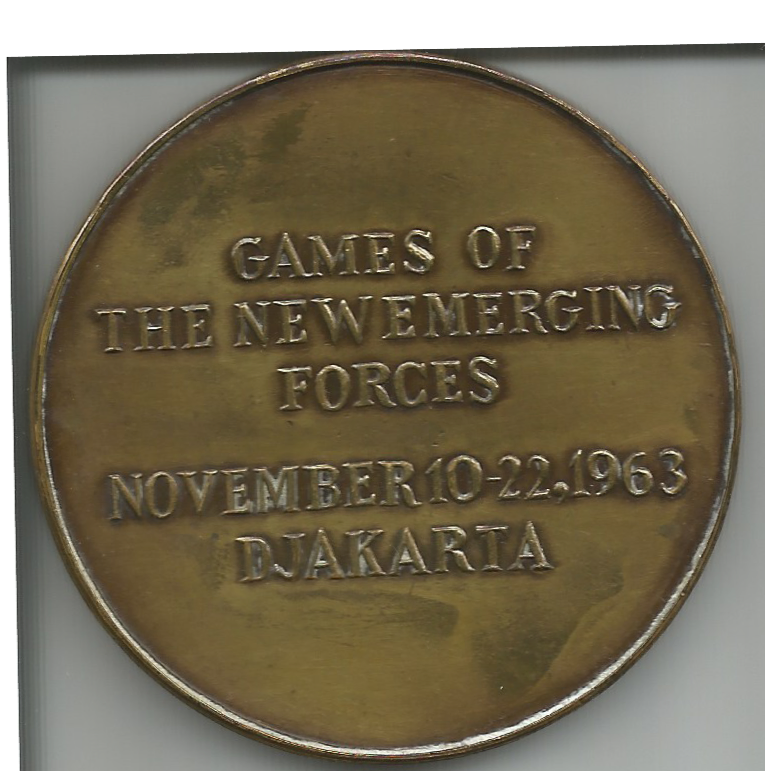
Back of Ganefo Bronze medal for Argentinian Water Polo Team

== 2nd GANEFO (1st Asian GANEFO) ==
2nd Asian GANEFO
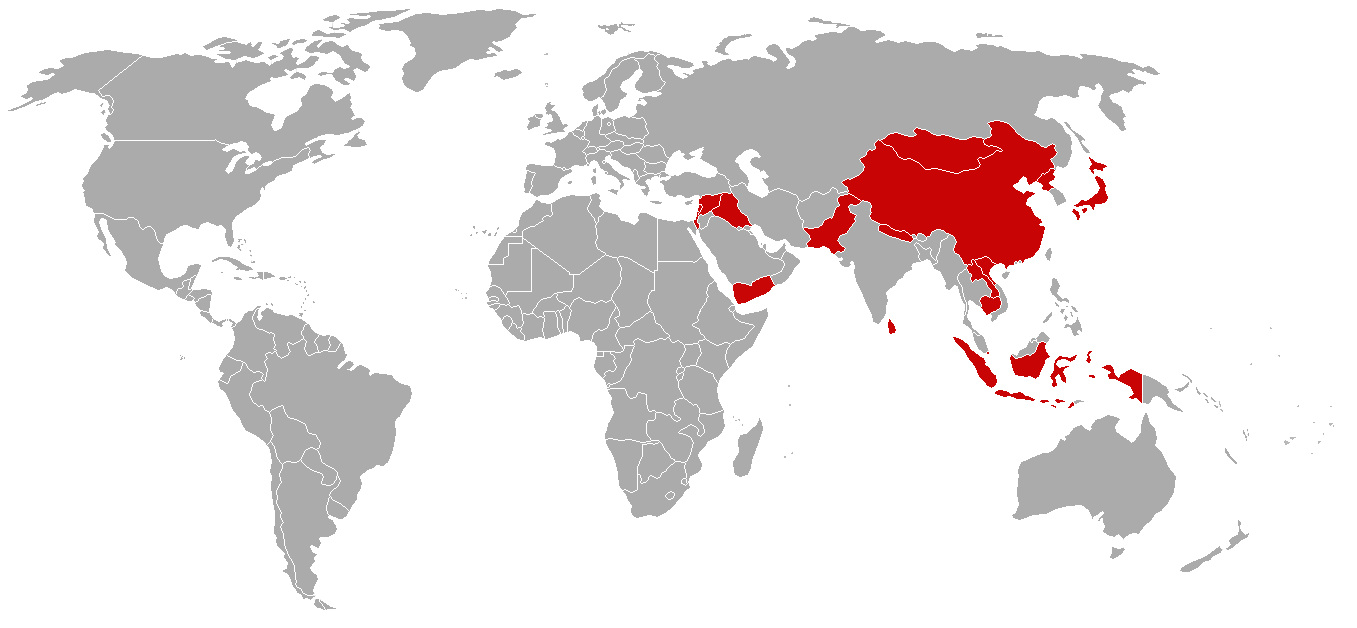
- Participating states
- Host city: Phnom Penh, Cambodia
- Nations: 17
- Athletes: 2,000
- Opening: 25 November 1966
- Closing: 6 December 1966
- Opened by: Prince Sihanouk
- Main venue: Olympic Stadium, Phnom Penh

The second edition of GANEFO had been planned to be held in Cairo, United Arab Republic, in 1967, but this was cancelled for various political reasons.

The second GANEFO was held in Phnom Penh, Cambodia, on 25 November – 6 December 1966.

=== Participating nations in 2nd GANEFO (1st Asian GANEFO) ===
About 2,000 athletes participated in the 2nd edition of GANEFO from 17 nations (Cambodia, Ceylon, China PR, Indonesia, Iraq, Japan, North Korea, Laos, Lebanon, Mongolia, Nepal, Pakistan, Palestine, Singapore, Syria, North Vietnam and Yemen). The games were opened by then Prince Sihanouk, the then Chief of State of Cambodia.

The second GANEFO was restricted to Asia, except Guinea which participated in the qualifying tournament in Pyongyang, North Korea, on 1–11 August 1965. Consequently, only 17 Asian countries participated in the second tournament in Phnom Penh, Cambodia, on 25 November – 6 December 1966 which was named '1st Asian GANEFO'.

=== Medal table at 2nd GANEFO (1st Asian GANEFO) ===
In the second edition of GANEFO, China PR was the highest-ranking country with 108 gold medals, North Korea the second, and the host nation, Cambodia, the third.

* Host nation (Cambodia)

Rank	Nation	Gold	Silver	Bronze	Total
1	China (CHN)	108	57	34	199
2	North Korea (PRK)	30	42	32	104
3	Cambodia (CAM)*	13	42	10	65
4	Japan (JPN)	10	12	8	30
Totals (4 entries)		161	153	84	398

== 2nd Asian GANEFO ==
In September 1967 was announced a second Asian GANEFO to be held in Beijing, China, in 1970, but later Beijing dropped the plans to host the Games, which were then awarded to Pyongyang, North Korea. The Games never occurred, however, and the GANEFO organisation collapsed.

== See also ==
- CONEFO
- BRICS Games
- Athletics at the 1963 GANEFO
- Athletics at the 1966 GANEFO
- Badminton at GANEFO
- 1976 Summer Olympics (also boycotted by China, and African countries)
- 1980 Summer Olympics (also boycotted by Indonesia and China, and Western Bloc countries)
- 1984 Summer Olympics (also boycotted by North Korea, and Eastern Bloc countries)
- Friendship Games (event held by Soviet Union to nations who boycotted the 1984 Summer Olympics)
