= List of leaders of the Communist Party of Indonesia =

Chairman/General Secretary of the Central Committee of Communist Party of Indonesia
- Ketua/Sekretaris Jenderal Komite Sentral Partai Komunis Indonesia
- Communist Party of Indonesia (PKI/CPI)
- Style: The Honorable (historical)
- Residence: PKI Central Committee Headquarters, Kramat Raya, Jakarta (historical)
- Nominator: Central Committee of the PKI
- Appointer: National Party Congress
- Term length: 5 years (under the 1959 Party Constitution), renewable
- Inaugural holder: Semaun (First native Indonesian chairman)
- Formation: 23 May 1920 (as Chairman of the PKH)
- Final holder: Oloan Hutapea (Emergency underground leader)
- Abolished: 12 March 1966 (De jure via presidential decree)
- Succession: Office abolished; party banned permanently
- Deputy: First Vice-Chairman, Second Vice-Chairman

The List of leaders of the Communist Party of Indonesia comprises the highest-ranking officials—serving either as chairmen of the executive committee or secretaries-general—throughout the turbulent history of the Communist Party of Indonesia (PKI). The title and administrative nature of this top leadership position underwent multiple transformations and restructurings, reflecting shifts in the party's ideological orientation, tactical maneuvers, and legal status. This timeline spans from its early foundational roots as the ISDV in 1914, through decades of clandestine operations during the colonial and Japanese eras, up to its total structural annihilation in 1966.

== Leadership History and Evolution ==
The supreme leadership of the PKI was heavily characterized by factional dominance, which shifted significantly depending on the historical era. The leadership's evolution can be broadly divided into four major phases: the formative legal/semi-legal phase (1914–1927), the fragmented underground and anti-fasis resistance phase (1932–1945), the post-war revolutionary realignment (1945–1950), and the legal electoral mass-party renaissance led by the younger generation (1951–1965).

Following the catastrophic collapse of the premature 1926–1927 uprisings, the party's formal open leadership network was completely severed by the Dutch colonial political intelligence unit (PID). During this dark era, the mantle of leadership fell upon highly secretive, localized klandestin (underground) cells. Figures like Pamudji managed to painstakingly reconstruct shattered internal networks over a twelve-year period, enduring into the brutal Japanese military occupation until his eventual execution by the Kempeitai. This clandestine relay was instantly picked up by youth factions under Subandi Widarta, who mobilized radical anti-fasis cadres into armed militias just as the proclamation of independence dawned in late 1945.

The post-independence era witnessed a brief, explosive internal struggle between old-guard veterans returning from foreign exile and localized laskar (militia) leaders, culminating in the tragic Madiun Affair of 1948. By January 1951, a youthful triumvirate consisting of D.N. Aidit, M.H. Lukman, and Njoto structurally sidelined the old-guard Komintern leaders like Alimin. Aidit implemented a highly disciplined, bureaucratic, and mass-oriented strategy that transformed the PKI into the largest non-ruling communist party in the world, securing a top-four finish in the milestone 1955 General Election. Formal top-tier leadership dissolved permanently in late 1965 following the 30 September Movement (G30S) debacle, leading to the extrajudicial execution of the main Politburo members and the ultimate crushing of the final underground armed resistance faksi in Blitar Selatan by the Indonesian military in 1968.

== List of Supreme Leaders (1914–1968) ==
The following chronological table documents every individual who held the supreme leadership mandate within the party structure, including critical emergency, transitional, and underground tenures:

No.	Image	Name	Term start	Term end	Official Title	Factional Basis / Political Line	Historical Notes
1		Henk Sneevliet	May 23, 1914	December 5, 1918	Chairman of the Executive Committee of the ISDV	Orthodox Marxism / "Bloc-within" Strategy	Born: 14 May 1883; Died: 13 April 1942. Main founder of the Indies Social Democratic Association (ISDV). Laid down the infiltration tactics inside Sarekat Islam. He was deported by the Dutch colonial authorities in late 1918. (Note: Leadership during the ISDV era was highly collegial; however, official legal signatures presented to colonial courts were held by Sneevliet as the founding chairman.)
2		Semaun	May 23, 1920	December 2, 1921	Chairman of the Communist Party of the Indies (PKH)	Trade Unionist / Semarang VAK	Born: c. 1899; Died: 7 April 1971. First native (bumiputera) leader after the ISDV mutated into the PKH in Semarang. Formulated the radical labor union baseline through the VSTP.
3		Tan Malaka	December 2, 1921	February 13, 1922	Chairman of the Communist Party of the Indies (PKH)	Pan-Islamism / Radical Revolutionist	Born: 2 June 1897; Died: 21 February 1949. Elected by acclaim during the party congress when Semaun left for Moscow. Arrested in Bandung and exiled due to his staunch support for general labor strikes. (Note: Tan Malaka's aggressive tactical style at the end of 1921 caused friction with the more patient Semaun-Darsono labor faction, who viewed his moves as overly avant-garde without sufficient mass preparation.)
(2)		Semaun	February 13, 1922	June 10, 1924	Chairman of the Central Committee	Democratic Centralism / Parliamentary Realism	Resumed the chairmanship upon returning from Moscow. Directed the party's reorganization and officially changed the entity's name to the Communist Party of Indonesia (PKI) in mid-1924.
4		Alibasah Winanta	June 10, 1924	July 31, 1924	Chairman of the Transitional Central Committee	Party Bureaucracy / Semarang Faction	Held an extremely brief transitional chairmanship immediately following the congress that formalized the PKI name change, bridging the gap before the executive center shifted to Jakarta under Aliarcham.
5		Aliarcham	July 31, 1924	August 10, 1925	Chairman of the Central Committee	Ultra-Leftism / Radical Jakarta Faction	Born: 1901; Died: 27 May 1933. Shifted the geopolitical party base from Semarang to Jakarta. Accelerated militant mass agitation before being arrested and exiled to the remote Boven-Digoel concentration camp.
6		Sardjono	August 10, 1925	November 10, 1926	Chairman of the Central Committee	Insurrectionist / Prambanan Committee	Died: 19 December 1948. Official leader during the theoretical planning of the armed revolt against the Dutch colonial state before the actual outbreak shattered the open structure.
7		Suprodjo	November 10, 1926	November 17, 1926	Chairman of the Emergency Insurrectionary Committee	Armed Insurrection / Tactical Liaison	Stepped into the leadership vacuum for a single week precisely as the November 1926 uprising erupted in Batavia and West Java. Arrested by colonial military forces during the initial counter-offensive. (Note: Suprodjo's tenure stands as the briefest emergency command in PKI history, caused by the immediate severance of communication lines between the central committee and regional wings during the abortive 1926 revolt.)
8		Pamudji	1932	February 22, 1944	Leader of the Underground Central Committee (Illegal PKI)	Clandestine Reconstruction / Anti-Fascist Cells	Died: 22 February 1944. Secretly rebuilt the party's shattered domestic infrastructure from scratch across Java and Bali. Maintained an underground command network for twelve years through late colonial rule into the Japanese occupation until his arrest and subsequent execution by the Japanese Kempeitai in Singaraja, Bali. (Note: Pamudji's long-term survival in the deep underground makes his tenure one of the most operationally enduring clandestine leaderships in pre-independence Indonesian political history.)
9		Musso	January 1, 1935	April 5, 1936	Underground Envoy / Comintern Liaison	Comintern Line (Anti-Fascist Popular Front)	Born: 12 August 1897; Died: 31 October 1948. Sneaked back into the country from the Soviet Union to establish an "Illegal PKI" network, which contextually overlapped and collaborated with Pamudji’s domestic cells before leaving the country again.
10		Amir Sjarifuddin	April 5, 1936	February 1, 1944	Leader of the Underground Popular Front Network	Anti-Fascism / Domestic Left Bloc	Born: 27 April 1907; Died: 19 December 1948. Ran underground cadre networks utilizing Dutch-subsidized resistance funds during the late colonial period and early Japanese entry until his capture by military police.
11		Subandi Widarta	February 22, 1944	December 23, 1945	Leader of the Clandestine Youth Council	Menteng 31 Faction / New Generation (Angkatan Baru)	Died: c. 1947. Assumed control of the remaining anti-fasis klandestin cells immediately following Pamudji's execution. Mobilized radical youth shock-troops during the outbreak of the August 1945 revolution before the network dissolved into the open political sphere.
12		Mohammad Jusuf	October 21, 1945	March 29, 1946	Secretary-General of the Central Committee	Radical Proclamation Youth	Unilaterally revived the public name of the PKI in Jakarta shortly after the proclamation, a move which initially ran parallel to Subandi Widarta's active cells. Sidelined by senior ex-Digoel returnees who deemed his political line adventuristic and unauthorized. (Note: Jusuf's early post-war leadership is frequently categorized by mainstream Marxist historians as an illegitimate or "spurious" PKI apparatus due to his lack of continuity or explicit mandate from pre-war veterans or international communist networks.)
(6)		Sardjono	March 29, 1946	August 11, 1948	Chairman of the Central Committee	National-Left Front / Restoration Period	Died: 19 December 1948. Resumed the chairmanship upon his release from Australian detention camps post-WWII to unify disparate left-wing factions amidst the ongoing Indonesian National Revolution.
(9)		Musso	August 11, 1948	October 31, 1948	Secretary-General of the Central Committee	Zhdanov Doctrine / Orthodox Stalinism	Returned from the Soviet Union with an explicit political mandate, launching the famous "New Road for the Republic" thesis. Took absolute control but was killed shortly thereafter following the outbreak of the Madiun Affair.
13		Alimin	November 1, 1949	January 7, 1951	Senior Representative / Collective Central Leadership	Old Comintern Guard / Exile Faction	Born: 1889; Died: 24 June 1964. Served as the primary veteran figurehead responsible for steadying and structurally rebuilding the remnants of the party after the Madiun catastrophe before being replaced by the younger generation.
14		Dipa Nusantara Aidit	January 7, 1951	September 20, 1959	Secretary-General of the Central Committee	National Communism / United Front Strategy	Born: 30 July 1923; Died: 22 November 1965. Selected as Secretary-General during the internal reshuffle of January 1951. He pivoted the party toward legal, peaceful, mass-based parliamentary participation prior to the 1955 elections.
(14)		Dipa Nusantara Aidit	September 20, 1959	November 22, 1965	Chairman of the Central Committee (CC-PKI)	Nasakom Bloc / Guided Democracy Alignment	Following the VI National Party Congress, the office of Secretary-General was replaced by the title of Chairman of the Central Committee. Guided the party to its absolute peak of domestic influence via close alliance with Sukarno until his extrajudicial execution in Boyolali following G30S.
15		Sudisman	November 22, 1965	December 1, 1966	Chief of the Emergency Politburo Command	Self-Criticism Line / Network Reconstruction	Born: 1920; Died: October 1968. The sole core Politburo member to evade initial capture in Jakarta. He organized emergency klandestin leadership and penned the famous *Kritik-Otokritik* document before his eventual capture in December 1966.
16		Oloan Hutapea	January 1, 1967	August 6, 1968	Chairman of the Underground Central Committee (Blitar Faction)	Maoism / People's Armed Guerilla Warfare	Died: 6 August 1968. Moved the remnant party apparatus to the deep, dense forests of Blitar Selatan to run a Maoist-style protracted rural guerrilla war. Killed during the military's sweep operation known as **Operasi Trisula**. (Note: Following the complete annihilation of the Blitar stronghold in 1968, a ceremonial external wing was loosely kept alive in Beijing exile under Jusuf Adjitorop until it faded out completely.)

== See also ==
- Communist Party of Indonesia
- 30 September Movement
- Indonesian mass killings of 1965–66
