= Djokosoedjono =

Indonesian communist politician and political prisoner

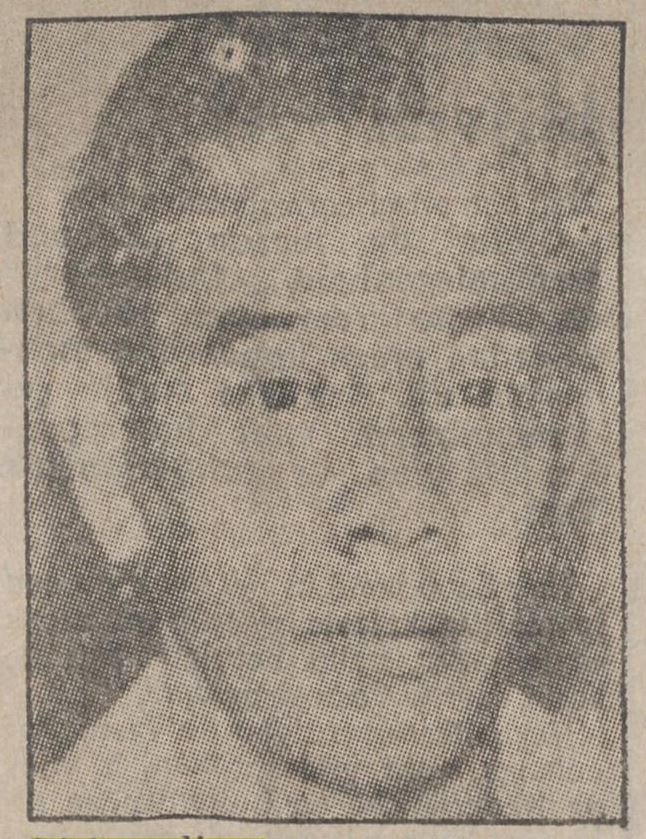
- Born: c. 1909; Blora
- Died: 1977
- Occupations: trade union leader, politician
- Years active: 1927–1966

Djokosoedjono (c. 1909–1977), sometimes spelled Djoko Sudjono, was an Indonesian trade union leader, communist politician and former political prisoner. He was imprisoned by the Dutch in Boven-Digoel concentration camp from 1938 to 1943, by the Indonesian republic under Sukarno in 1948 and 1951, and by the Suharto regime from 1967 to his death in 1977. He was a parliamentarian in the Indonesian House of Representatives representing the Central All-Indonesian Workers Organization and then the Communist Party of Indonesia for most of the Liberal democracy and Guided democracy periods.

== Biography ==
=== Early life ===
Djokosoedjono is thought to have been born in Blora Regency, Dutch East Indies in 1909. Little is known about his family background or education. He was Javanese.

=== Political activity in the Dutch East Indies ===
Djokosoedjono became involved in left-wing and Indonesian nationalist politics in Surabaya by 1927, when he worked as an administrator for the Soeloeh Ra'jat Indonesia (people's torch of Indonesia), followed by Soeara Oemoem (public voice). He became administrator of Persatoean Cooperatie Indonesia (cooperative union of Indonesia) in 1930 and was director of a school in Surabaya in 1931. He gravitated to the New Indonesian National Party and became chairman of one of its affiliated unions P.B.K.I. (Persatoean Boeroeh Kreta Api, Union of Railway Workers) in 1933. In 1934 he was also chairman of the Persatoean Sarekat Sekerdja Indonesia (PSSI, association of Indonesian workers unions) which was also based in Surabaya.

PKI leader Musso returned from the USSR to Surabaya in November 1935, sent by the Soviets to rebuild an illegal PKI party since the party had been banned in the Indies and its leaders exiled. Djokosoedjono became one of the leaders of this new Surabaya-based Illegal-PKI cell along with Mas Ruskak, Pamudji and Achmad Soemadi. Having educated this small cadre in communist principles and popular front planning, Musso left the Indies for Shanghai in May 1936. When Musso left the PKI was refounded with Ruskak as chairman, Soemadi as secretary, Djokosoedjono in charge of cadre formation and Siti Larang became head of the women's wing. They focused their recruitment effort among the nationalist youth movements in Java.

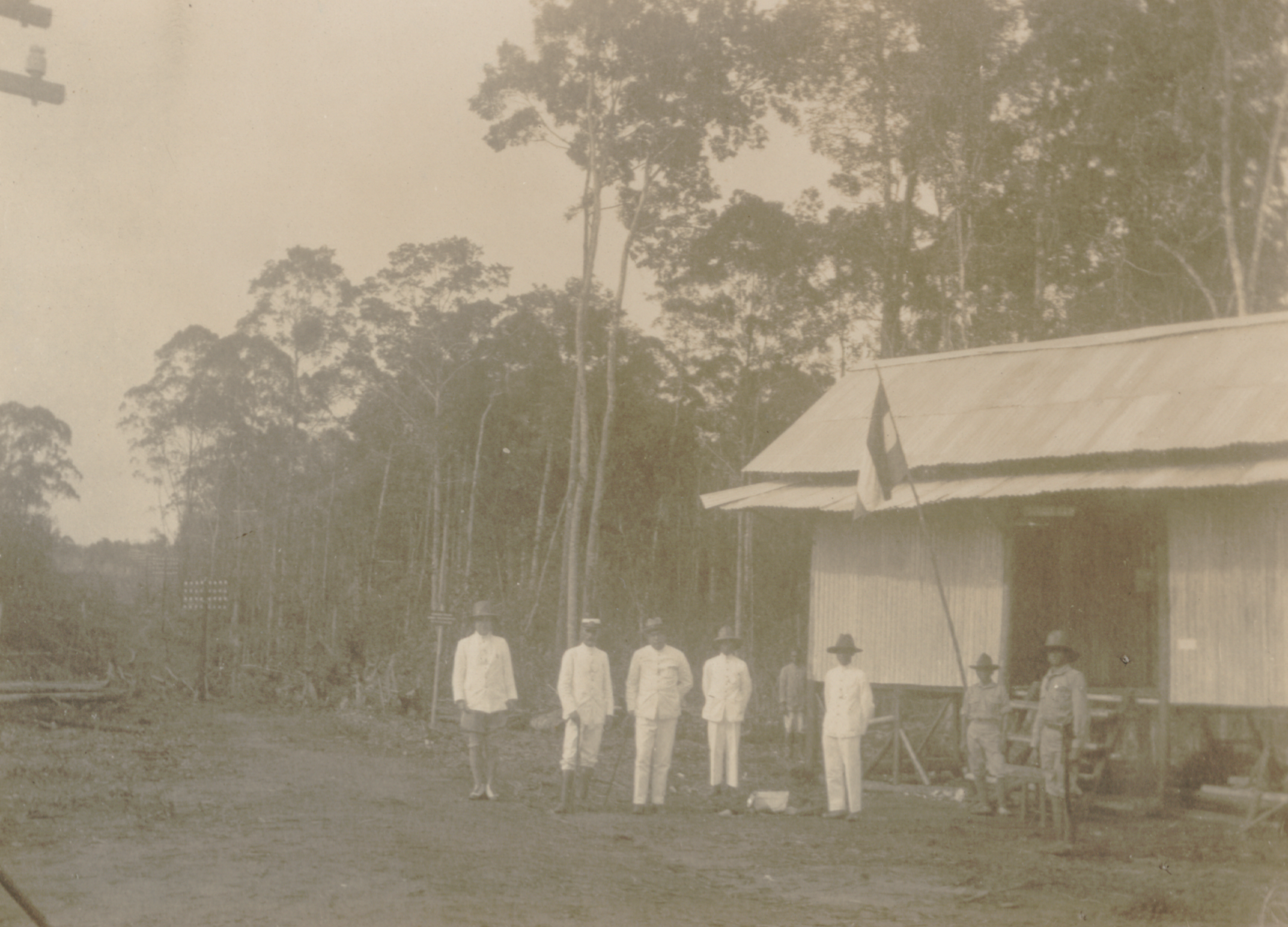
Scene in Boven-Digoel camp circa 1928

The group recruited about 30 members, but soon attracted the attention of the Dutch secret police. The police started to surveil and arrest their members, until they had all been captured by February 1937. Djokosoedjono and Achmad Soemadi were arrested in December 1936 on their way from Gresik to Surabaya. Twelve of the arrested PKI members, including Djokosoedjono, Roeskak and Achmad Soemadi were exiled to Boven-Digoel concentration camp in New Guinea in 1938, joining hundreds of PKI members who had been sent in the late 1920s. Their arrival in the camp somewhat revitalized the political situation there among older PKI exiles.

Djokosoedjono was a key figure in the PKI central committee in exile in Australia alongside Ngadiman and Sabariman. Due to the alliance between the USSR and Western countries at that time, those PKI members in exile agreed to work for the Indies government in exile in propagandizing against the Japanese. Djokosoedjono and his old colleagues Hardjono and Achmad Soemadi worked for the Dutch through SIBAR (Serikat Indonesia Baroe, New Indonesia Association).

=== Political activity in Indonesia ===
When the war ended, the exile of most of the former Digoel internees in Australia was annulled by the Dutch; Djokosoedjono returned to Indonesia. He became chairman of the railway union S.K.B.A again. In the fourth sitting of the Central Indonesian National Committee (KNIP) in 1946, he was appointed to represent Yogyakarta in the non-partisan worker's bloc. Musso returned to Indonesia and reorganized communists and socialists under his leadership in the Front Demokrasi Rakjat (democratic people's front, FDR); Djokosoedjono joined the new PKI worker's secretariat along with his former Digoel companions Hardjono and Achmad Soemadi. After the Madiun Affair, Djokosoedjono was arrested along with many other party members, journalists, and so on. He denied any knowledge of the uprising and was not seriously punished. (Not to be confused with Colonel Djokosoedjono, who was the military leader of the Madiun uprising and who was executed alongside Amir Sjarifuddin and others.) Thereafter he remained in the leadership of the party under Tan Ling Djie, alongside Alimin and others. This group were quite critical of the Dutch–Indonesian Round Table Conference and saw it as a capitulation to the Dutch.

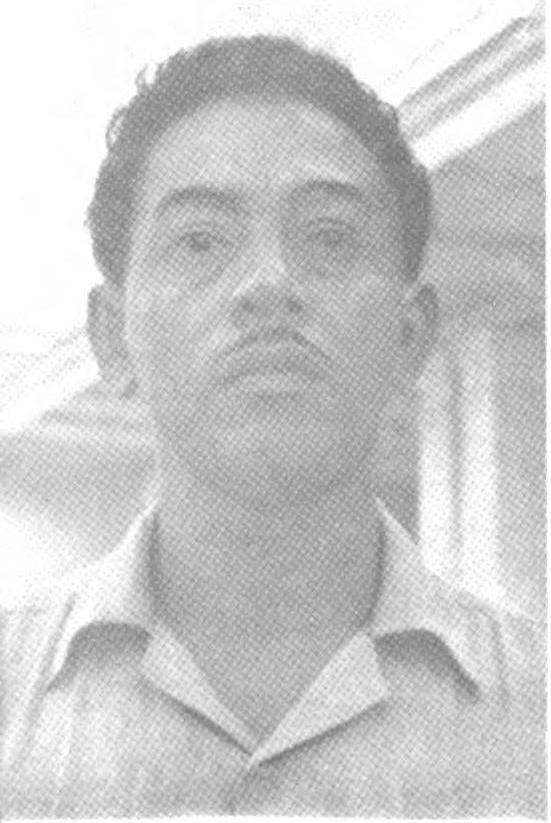
Portrait of Djokosoedjono, 1954

When the Provisional House of Representatives was created in August 1950, he was appointed to its membership along with 45 other KNIP members, this time as a representative of the Central All-Indonesian Workers Organization (SOBSI). Despite not formally representing the Communist Party, he made no secret of his ties to them and was openly pro-Soviet and anti-American. In August 1951, following communist unrest in Tanjung Priok, the Indonesian military carried out mass arrests of 950 political figures who it placed in Preventive detention. Djokosoedjono was arrested along with nine leftist members of parliament which included Siauw Giok Tjhan and journalists from Sin Po; the offices of the PKI and SOBSI were also searched. The arrests caused a scandal in the House and led to criticism of the army's impunity and the violation of parliamentary immunity.

During the Provisional House session, he was a strong advocate for socialist policies, for example the nationalization of rail services in Indonesia or for the expansion of trade with the USSR and Ghana under Kwame Nkrumah. He was a strong critic of both the Wilopo Cabinet and the Burhanuddin Harahap Cabinet. D. N. Aidit took over the leadership of the Communist Party in 1951 and by 1953 had purged many leaders who were not in his clique, including Tan Ling Djie. Djokosoedjono was promoted to the central committee which also included Achmad Soemadi, Jusuf Adjitorop, Alimin, Peris Pardede, and others.

In the 1955 Indonesian legislative election he was elected to represent Central Java for the Communist Party in the House of Representatives. He continued to advocate for workers' causes, for example in updating workers' rights legislation in late 1956. In the PKI's sixth congress in September 1959 he was reelected to the party's Central Committee and to its Secretariat.

Following the failed 30 September Movement, in which the Communist Party was implicated, Djokosoedjono was forced to go into hiding along with most of the party leadership. On 12 November 1965 his membership in the DPR-GR was frozen along with 55 communist and left-wing members. In the chaos and lawlessness of the Transition to the New Order, it is unclear when exactly he was arrested. Some accounts say he was arrested in 1966, whereas others describe him as still being in hiding in late 1968. However, he must have been in captivity by July 1967 as he is known to have testified in the military tribunal of Sudisman, another former PKI leader. By the time he was in prison, his health worsened due to untreated diabetes and he lost the ability to walk. He died in 1977.
