= 1951 mass arrests in Indonesia =

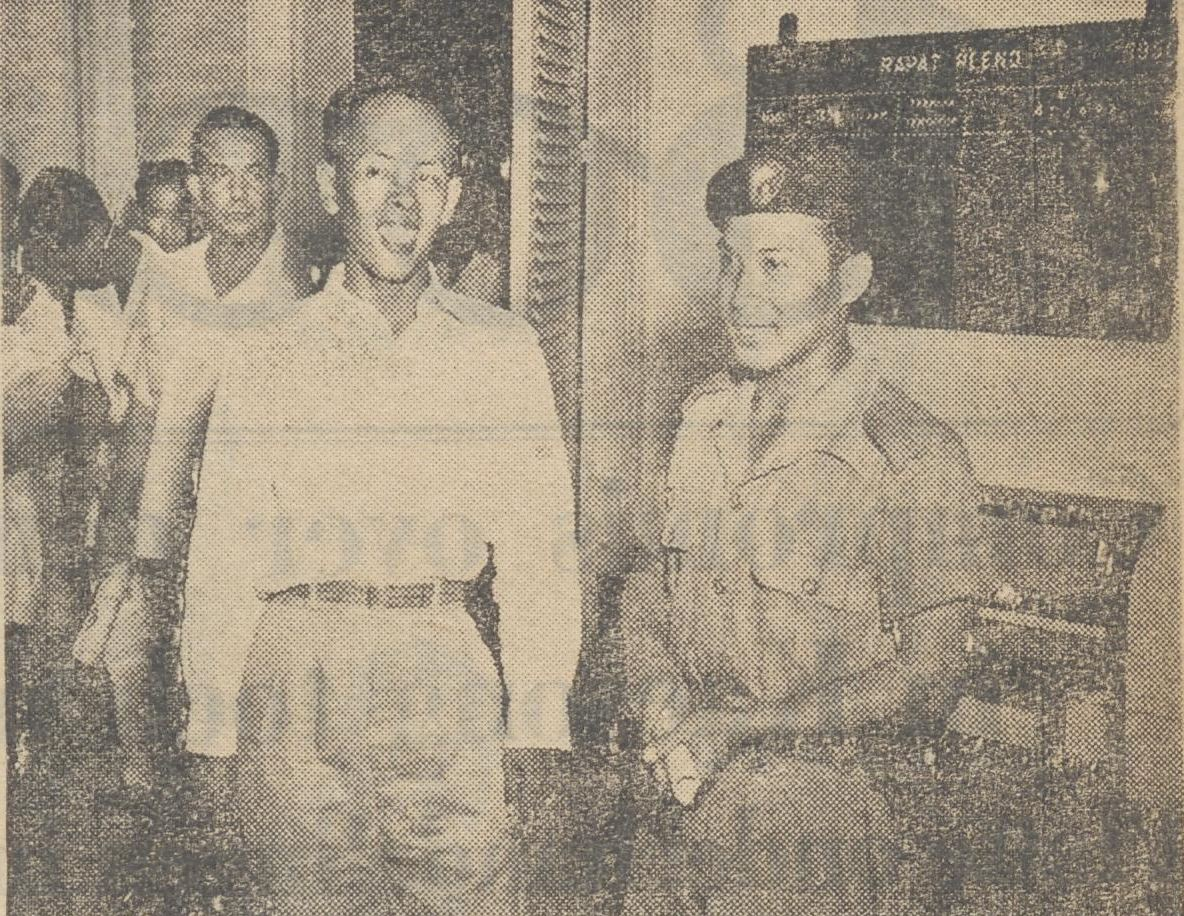
- Parliamentarian Sarwono being arrested in Indonesian parliament, 16 August 1951
- Date: August 6 – September 28, 1951
- Location: throughout Java and Sumatra
- Also known as: August Raid
- Type: Mass arrest, Preventive detention
- Motive: political repression
- Target: Communist Party of Indonesia leaders and members, trade unionists, leftists, other politicians
- Perpetrators: Government of Indonesia, Soekiman Cabinet, Indonesian National Armed Forces
- Arrests: approximately 15,000

Mass arrests, primarily of communists and leftists, were carried out in Java and Sumatra in August and September 1951. Sometimes called the August Raid, or in Indonesian the Razia Agustus (August Razzia), this was a move by the Indonesian government, led by the Soekiman Cabinet, to prevent a rumoured coup by the Communist Party of Indonesia (PKI) and its allies. The total number of detainees started with several hundred in early August and ended up as roughly 15,000 across Indonesia by October. Many were released without charge within days or months, but some remained in detention until the Wilopo Cabinet took power in April 1952.

== Background ==
The coalition in power at the time of the mass arrests was the short-lived Soekiman Cabinet, which was mainly supported by factions of the Indonesian National Party and the Masyumi Party. It was faced by strikes and instability in the summer of 1951, violent rural banditry, internal political divisions, and tensions over the negotiations of the Treaty of San Francisco which would mean peace between Indonesia and Japan. In June the Justice Minister Mohammad Yamin also unexpectedly pardoned 950 political prisoners, including Chairul Saleh and a variety of suspected rebels, without consulting the army and based on his arbitrary assessment of each person and not legal principles. The outrage over this forced Yamin to resign from cabinet.

Although the Indonesian Communist Party (PKI) was legal in Indonesia, it was not on good terms with the government. Strikes in the summer led to tensions between the PKI and affiliated unions, and the government. In one incident at the port of Tanjung Priok in Jakarta on 5 August, 150 armed men with communist insignias raided a police station and exchanged gunfire with Indonesian security services for hours, including police and members of the Brimob. At least six people died, including three police officers, and a number of others were wounded. The PKI denied involvement. There were also rumours of secret planning for a coup between members of the Communist Party and representatives from the People's Republic of China. The incident in Tanjung Priok, and its possible connection to incidents in other cities such as a bombing in Bogor, led the government to widen its investigations. The 1948 Madiun Affair, a conflict between the government and the Communist Party was also still in recent memory and was invoked as a reason for the aggressive crackdown. The pro-American, anti-PRC attitudes of the Soekiman cabinet and their desire to undermine their political opponents were also major factors.

== Arrests ==
The plan for mass arrests was agreed upon between Prime Minister Soekiman Wirjosandjojo, one or two ministers, and the Public Prosecutor Suprapto following the Tanjung Priok events. President Sukarno seems to have agreed to it as well. The first round of arrests was of people accused of participating in the Tanjung Priok shootout; the district was closed off to the public and roughly fifty were arrested in the days following the incident. Police thought they had identified a ringleader but were unable to link the shootout to the PKI. Rumours were circulating of much wider arrests of communists, although it was denied by the government and it wasn't expected that the PKI would be banned.

=== Sumatra ===
On 11 August, the government enacted a curfew in Medan, North Sumatra under the pretext of military exercises, and started arresting hundreds of "troublemakers" in and around the city. Estimates of the first raid put it at 51 people arrested, including leading Sumatran communists Abdoe'lxarim MS and Jusuf Ajitorop and local PKI members, though the number was soon revised upwards to almost 500. S.M. Tari, editor of the paper Rakjat was also arrested, as were many members of the National Party. The government denied that it was targeting any particular ideological group or party; these detainees (250 or so) were kept at Camp Helvetia near Medan. The majority of names of detainees were kept secret, however, and targeted arrests continued to take place in the Medan area and throughout Sumatra throughout August; the practice of closing towns while mass arrests took place was repeated elsewhere. By 20 August some of the people from the original Medan raid were released, including Abdoe'lxarim MS, Mohamed Tahir Simatupang, Liem Tjian Tjin, Liem Kian Seng, Mohamed Junus Nasution, and so on.

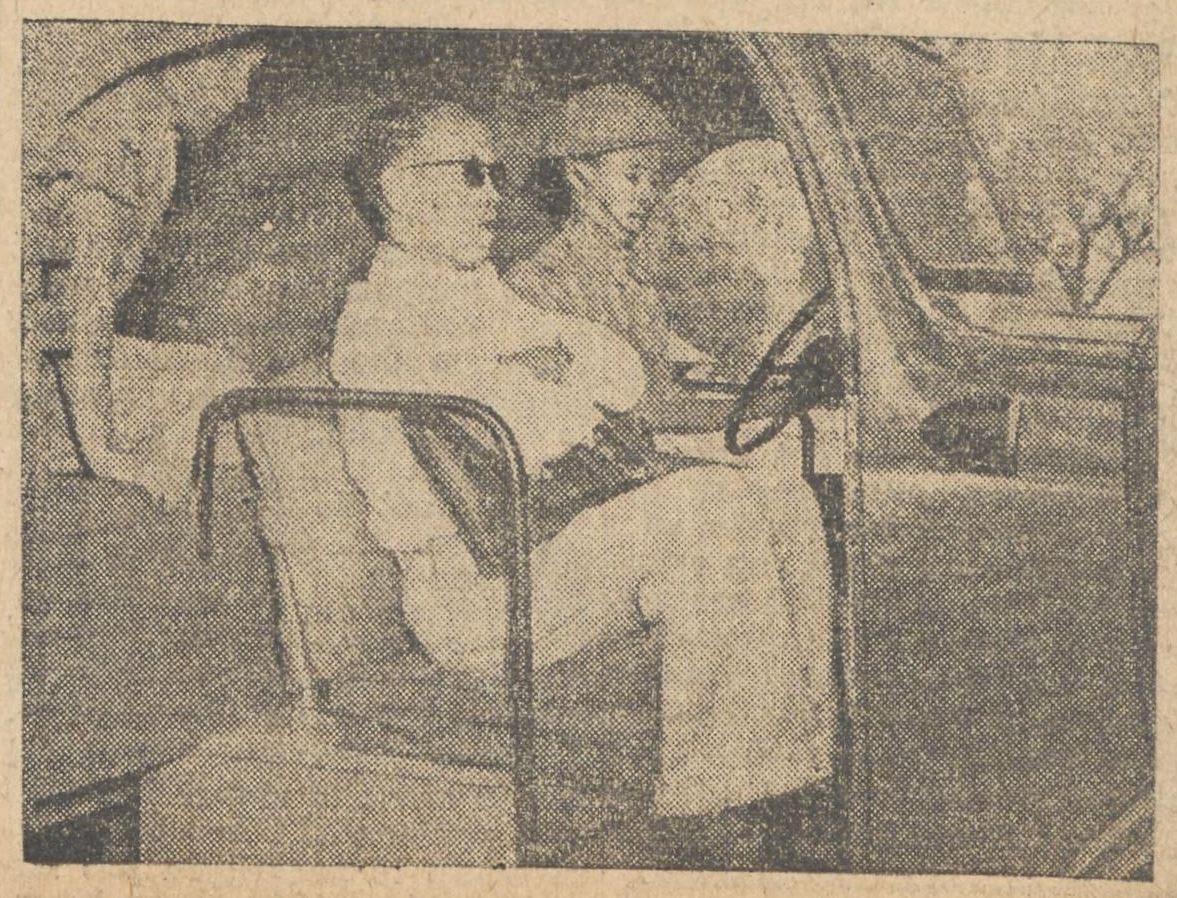
A photo of Indonesian parliamentarian Sarwono S. Sutardjo being arrested in parliament 16 August 1951

=== Jakarta ===
The most high-profile arrests began in Jakarta on 16 August, the day before Indonesian Independence Day, which the PKI had threatened to boycott. Military police carried out preventive detention of roughly 100 communists and leftists, including sixteen members of the Provisional House of Representatives, some of whom were arrested at their homes early in the morning. Soekiman gave a brief statement in the House on the 16th, promising more arrests but refusing to go into detail for operational reasons. Information Minister Arnold Mononutu also kept the charges secret and alleged the a foreign power was preparing a coup in cooperation with local Communists.

Among the arrested parliamentarians were Mudigdo, Tjudito, and Djokosoedjono of the PKI, Mustafa of the worker's bloc, Pandu, Syono and Maruto of the Murba Party, Sarwono S. Sutardjo of the Partai Kedaulatan Rakjat, Sidik Kertopari of the Peasants Front of Indonesia (BTI), and independent member Siauw Giok Tjhan. PKI leaders Alimin, Lukman, Njoto and D. N. Aidit managed to escape arrest, but further raids detained Aidit's non-PKI father, Abdullah Aidit, as well as PKI leaders Peris Pardede, Tan Ling Djie, Karsono Werdojo, and Sakirman. Alimin escaped to the PRC's embassy and was given asylum, whereas Lukman, Njoto and Aidit stayed in hiding for months. Rustam Effendi, an Indonesian-born Dutch communist who had represented the Communist Party of the Netherlands in the House of Representatives of the Netherlands from 1933 to 1946, was also in Jakarta and was arrested. The Ministry of Labour was also raided; senior officials Hadiomo Kusumoutojo, Suprapto and Abdul Rachman were detained. Many of the Jakarta-area detainees were kept in the Cipinang Penitentiary Institution.

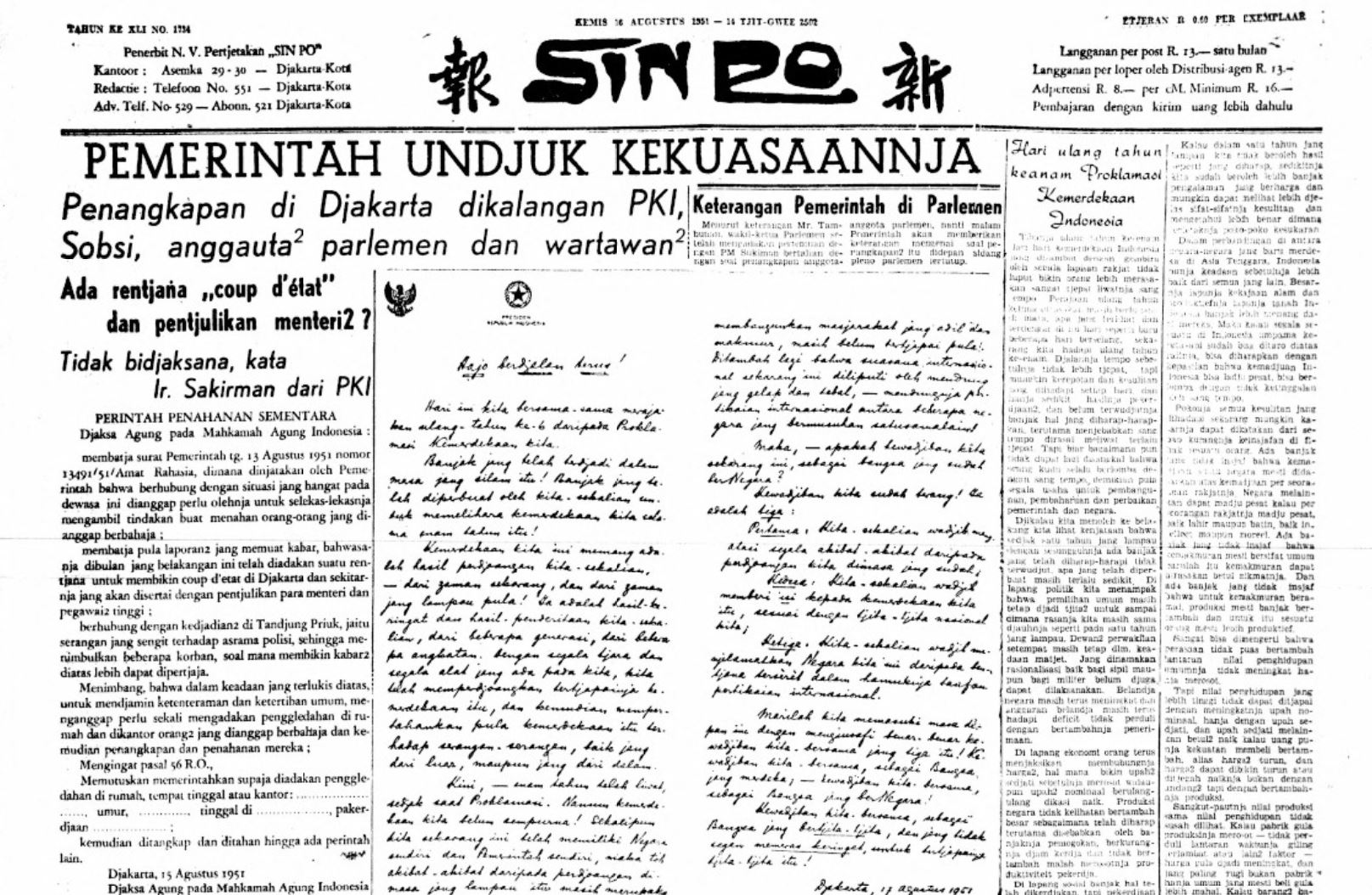
Front page of Sin Po on 16 August covering the arrest of its editors

Journalists were also arrested. Five editors from Sin Po were brought in: A. Karim, Tjia Tjo Soen, Lieng Jing Chen, Lee Swie Kee and Oen Tek Hian, as well as the director Ang Jan Goan. The arrested parliamentarian Siauw Giok Tjhan was also editor of Harian Rakjat; the editor Kasan of Indonesia Raya and Lie Kit of the Chinese magazine Cheng Lim were also rounded up. Also arrested was the freelance journalist and former chairman of the Persatuan Tionghoa Indonesia Liem Koen Hian, as was the chairman of the Journalist's union (Indonesian: Serikat Buruh Pertjetakan Indonesia) Suhardjo. Military police also raided the offices of the Central All-Indonesian Workers Organization (SOBSI, a communist-affiliated union) and of the PKI, a well as the private homes of some PKI members. Chinese community leaders were also arrested.

=== East Java ===
Arrests in East Java seem to have started on 16 August as well. Several hundred had been arrested by 19 August; initial accounts counted 35 in Surabaya, 40 in Bojonegoro, 50 in Madiun, 20 in Kediri and 15 in Malang. News reports debated whether Dutch and Chinese citizens had also been arrested, as well as a smaller number of non-leftist Indonesians. Many journalists were rounded up in the East Java raids, including Go Tjing Hok, editor of the Java Post, Goe Po An, editor of Trompet Masjarakat, and others. Among the political figures who were rounded up in Surabaya were Oloan Hutapea, chairman of the regional PKI and editor of Bintang Merah, Roeslan Kamaloedin, general secretary of the Surabaya PKI, and many other local members; Soebardi, Soetomi, and a number of SOBSI leaders; and Soepardi and Cholil of the Rukun Kampung Kota Surabaya (RKKS, Surabaya City district association, a communist-affiliated neighborhood association). Heads of local Chinese organizations were also arrested, including Djie Tjhiang Than of the Red China-Indonesia Friendship Association and a number of headmasters of Chinese schools. In subsequent days other communist and left-wing leaders of youth (pemuda) organizations were located and arrested in Surabaya.

=== West Java ===
100 or so people were arrested in Cirebon, West Java on 17 August, with the support of a Mobile Brigade unit from Bandung, though none of the figures were high-profile political ones. The military police portrayed the detainees as a mix of criminal gangs, Darul Islam rebellion supporters, members of the paramilitary Barisan Sakit Hati and communists. They denied any link to the mass arrests in Sumatra. Another 50 were arrested in Bandung, West Java on 20 August; again, the PKI and SOBSI offices were raided, with a list of local party and union leaders sought by police.

Another 100 were arrested in West Java on 28 August, bringing the total to around 2000. This time non-leftists were also arrested, including Muhammad Isa Anshary and members of the Masyumi Party. Three Dutch citizens were also arrested: Koops, F. Alewijn and W.F. van de Woestijne, leading to a diplomatic inquiry from the Netherlands.

=== Central Java ===
Raids in Central Java province started on 19 August. The PKI office in Bojong in Semarang was raided and the police spent a full day going through its archive; most of the local trade unions were raided the next day. In the raids, prominent union leaders were arrested, including not only SOBSI, but the Oil workers and Cigarette factory worker unions, local PKI leaders, left-wing city councilors, and leaders of the Murba Party, Partai Rakjat Indonesia and others were detained. Chinese organizations and schools were also raided, but arrests were not made, but ten members of the Lembaga Indonesia Tionghoa, a Chinese-Indonesian friendship association, were arrested.

On 20 August raids were conducted in nearby Salatiga as well, where 9 SOBSI, BTI and Chinese organization leaders were arrested. On the same day raids took place in Yogyakarta In Surakarta; members of the local PKI secretariat were rounded up as well as staff at the Chinese General Association (Chung Hua Tsung Hui, CHTH) school and students at the Chinese High school. Local political circles tied to the government, including National Party members, supported the raids and said they must have some basis. 22 more were arrested in Surakarta on 22 August, including more PKI members, leaders of the Sugar Worker Unions and youth organizations.

The most high-profile raids in Java and Sumatra took place in August, but they didn't end then. Mass arrests continued into the fall, and by early November the government estimated the total number of arrests as being around 15,000.

== Reaction and release ==
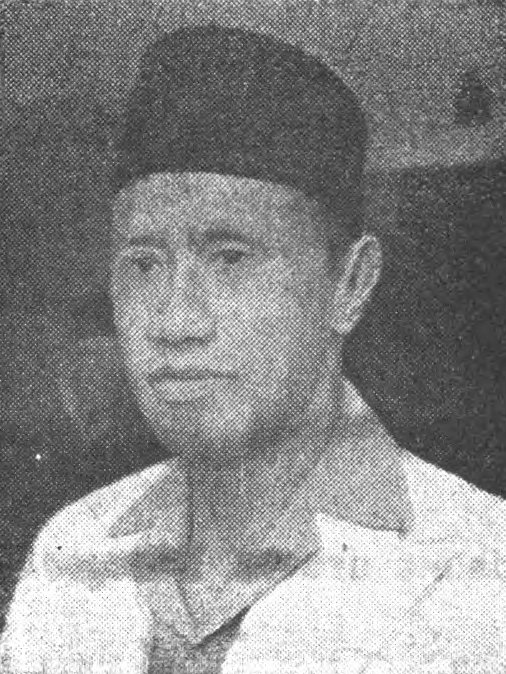
Soekiman Wirjosandjojo c.1950

Parliamentarians were very unhappy about the detention of their members and protested as early as 16 August, when Deputy Speaker Albert Mangaratua Tambunan sent a delegation to the Prime Minister to demand an explanation. Even right-wing members who otherwise supported the crackdown objected to the House being cordoned off and members dragged out in the middle of a session, and many members of Soekiman's own cabinet had been blindsided by the mass arrests. The indefinite detention of 16 or more members also meant that the House might not be able to achieve quorum (110 members) and carry on its business. The PKI and SOBSI also complained that their offices had been searched and called the mass arrest of their parliamentarians an open violation of democratic and human rights; they complained that their party was a legal one and its members shouldn't be detained without cause. Later in the month, the PKI accused the Soekiman coalition of falling prey to a "rising fascist ideology" akin to that which Indonesians lived under during the Japanese occupation. Other parties supported the repression or were ambivalent. Masyumi, some of whose members had been arrested, still supported the campaign overall, whereas Sutan Sjahrir of the Socialist Party of Indonesia said communist or Darul Islam rebels were just symptoms of deeper economic causes.

The Indonesian Army was unhappy about the arrests when they began in August, because they had not been consulted about them and were expected to carry them out under a legally shaky state of emergency. The Australian Minister for Foreign Affairs Casey met with his Indonesian counterpart Achmad Soebardjo in September and said he was pleasantly surprised by the anti-communist attitude of the Indonesian government. The United States ambassador to Indonesia, H. Merle Cochran, was a close ally of Soekiman and also reacted positively to the arrests. On the other hand, the PRC reacted badly to the accusations against them and China-Indonesian relations deteriorated significantly.

The arrests were widely covered in the local and international press, not only via wire services and in the New York Times, but in the communist press, including the Daily Worker and De Waarheid. The reaction generally fell along ideological lines, with leftist papers being outraged and right-wing papers supporting the measures.

The mass arrests in August surprised the Communist Party and its affiliated organizations and seemingly neutered their ability to react. Aidit and the other leaders who were in hiding did spend the time studying Indonesian politics and revised the party's strategies. The repression also led to some trade unions to distance themselves from the Communist Party, although the majority remained affiliated; the PKI also remained politically isolated from the other left-wing parties in the House. By late August, many of the affiliated unions were holding protests against the continuing detention of PKI and union leaders. SOBSI later claimed that 3000 of its leaders and members were arrested in the sweeps. The PKI also moderated its agrarian policy and stopped supporting armed activity within Indonesia as a result of the arrests, but the detentions did not slow the rapid growth of the party in the early 1950s.

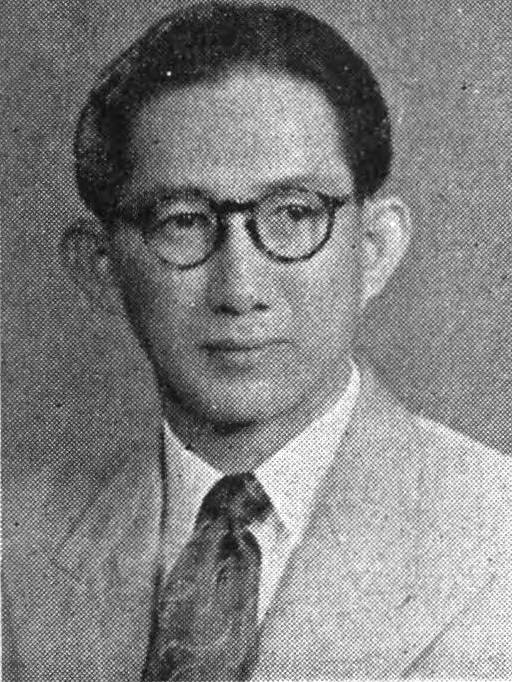
Tan Po Goan, Baperki representative in the Provisional House of Representatives

Some of the detainees were released within days due to a lack of evidence against them, but others were held without charge for several months or even a year. By late September, parliamentarians were tiring of the indefinite internment of so many citizens and an Interpellation was put to the government about it. Tan Po Goan, a lawyer and parliamentarian representing Baperki who put forward the interpellation, noted that people who had been foot soldiers in the APRA rebellion in 1949 who had been held without charge for a year and a half and received an apology upon their release. He worried that hundreds of people had been held in Jakarta arrests since August and none had been convicted yet, due to the weak legal basis for their arrest. Soekiman formally answered in mid-October, replying that the government had to take those preventive measures to stop a fifth column from infiltrating and destabilizing the country. Tan Po Goan found the answer incomplete and asked for a more detailed response from the government about the basis on which it felt entitled to act outside the law. He called their detention policies "Made in Holland".

Soekiman replied once again that the government had to continue to act to stop destructive elements which were present in society. He said that circumstances were not normal, so governments could not rely completely on the law, but should instead use it as a guide. He claimed that anyone who was innocent would be released immediately and that the Attorney General had access to proof that had not yet been made public. He also noted that the detainees had been prevented from being committing any crimes during those months and asked the critical parliamentarians if they should just sit and wait for a coup d'état to take place.

Facing further criticism, at the end of October Soekiman and his government began to claim that they had evidence of a plot to assassinate President Sukarno, Vice President Mohammed Hatta and several ministers. However, the lack of any trials for those suspected of the plots calls into question its connection to the mass arrests. Soekiman also asserted that detainees had confessed to planning a coup against the Indonesian Republic. He denied that the government had committed any legal excesses, and offered to send the Attorney General to personally visit every single arrest site and punish any local officials who had gone beyond their mandate. He said that he regretted having had to arrest sitting parliamentarians within the House back in August, but that Indonesian government apparatuses were still emerging from a revolutionary period and had not yet reached a state of perfection. Following the speech, Tan Po Goan expressed skepticism and some of the left-wing parties tried to pass a censure motion against Soekiman, but were voted down.

Upon the fall of the Soekiman Cabinet in early 1952, the release of August detainees was one of the demands of left-wing parties being asked to support an incoming new government. When the Wilopo Cabinet took power, it began to release the remaining detainees, and seems to have freed all of them during their time in power.
