= Peris Pardede =

Indonesian Communist politician

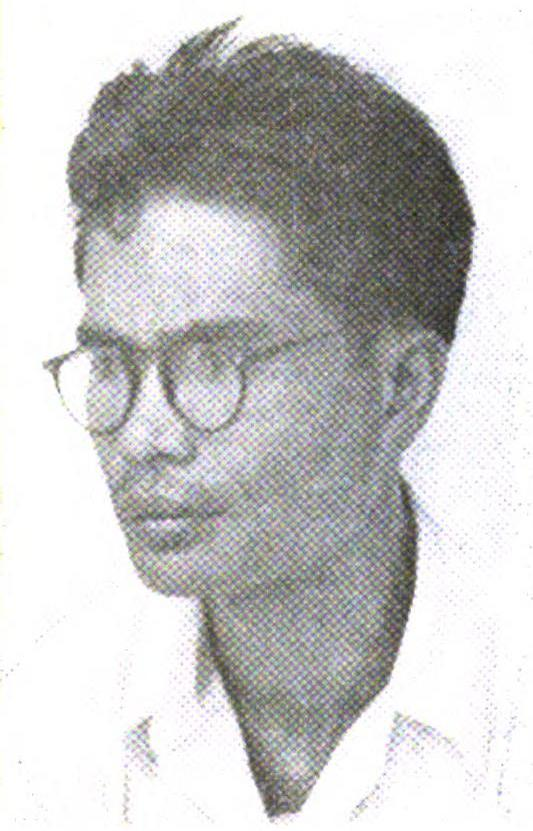
- Born: 20 January 1918; North Tapanuli Regency, Dutch East Indies
- Died: 1982 (aged 63–64); Medan, Indonesia
- Occupations: politician, newspaper editor

Peris Pardede (1918–1982) was an Indonesian politician who was a key figure in the Communist Party of Indonesia during the Sukarno era. He held various roles, including editor of the party magazine Bintang Merah, representative of the party in the Provisional House of Representatives and the House of Representatives throughout the 1950s and early 1960s, and Politburo candidate in 1965. After the party was banned in 1965, he was put on trial and spent his final decades as a political prisoner of the Suharto regime.

== Early life ==
Pardede was born in Lumban Rau, Parsoburan, Balige, North Tapanuli Regency, Dutch East Indies (today located in Indonesia) on 20 January 1918. He attended a Christian Hollandsch-Inlandsche School in Narumonda, North Tapanuli Regency, graduating in 1934. After that he left Sumatra for the colonial capital Batavia, enrolling in a MULO school run by Muhammadiyah, although he left without graduating in 1936. In 1938 he relocated to Cirebon in West Java and took up a role as a pawnshop officer (Dutch: beambte pandhuisdienst). During the Japanese occupation of the Dutch East Indies he returned to Batavia and operated a watch shop.

== Communist Party activity ==
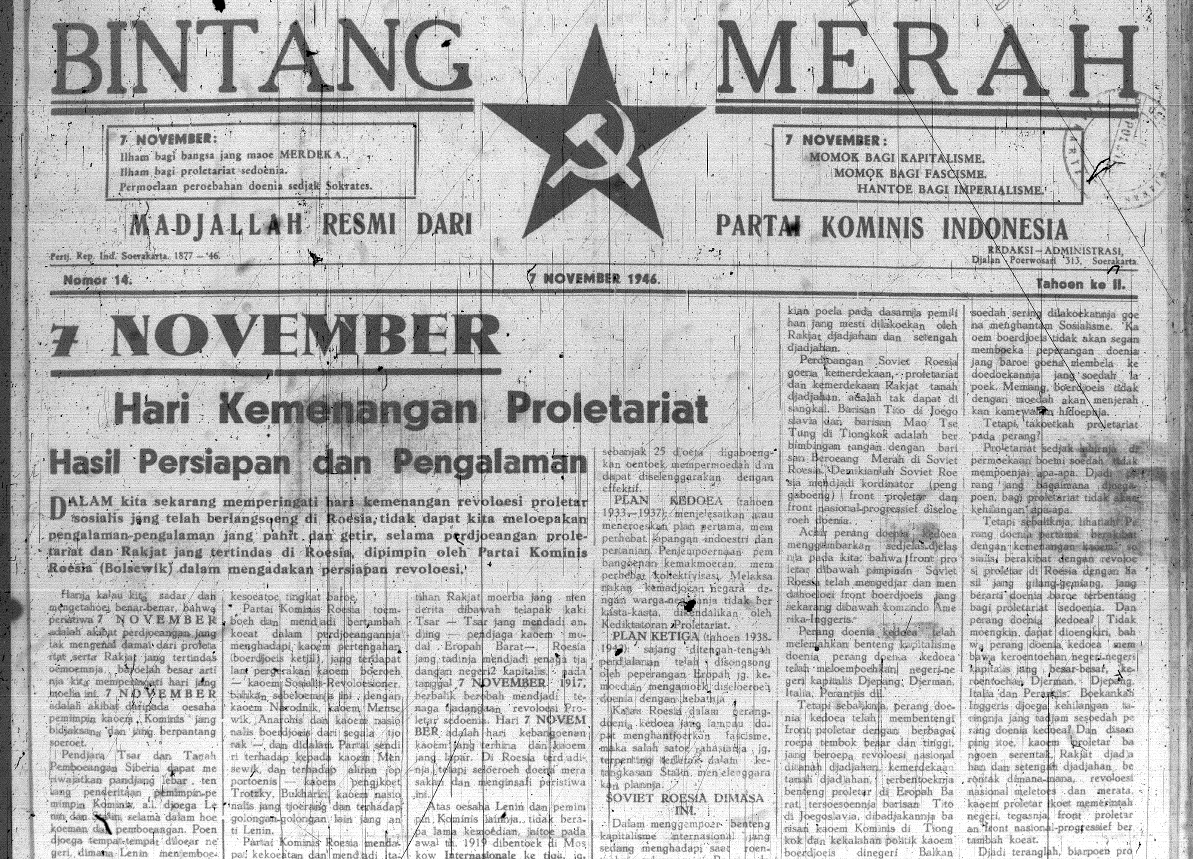
An issue of Bintang Merah from 1946

In 1945, during the Indonesian National Revolution, Pardede joined a nationalist youth brigade led by Wikana (the Angkatan Pemuda Indonesia, API); he seems to have been radicalized into left-wing politics during this period. At around this time he joined the Communist Party of Indonesia (Partai Komunis Indonesia, PKI), possibly recruited by a colleague from the watch shop, Mohammad Sain, who had been one of the members who refounded the party in 1945. The watch shop was the headquarters of the Communist magazine Bintang Merah, and Pardede worked as an editor under the guidance of Lukman. He also spent time in Yogyakarta during 1947–8 working as a clerk for the foreign ministry of the Indonesian Republic and for the People's Democratic Front (Front Demokrasi Rakjat, FDR), eventually being elected to its secretariat along with fellow communists D. N. Aidit, Njoto and Sudisman. When the FDR was implicated in the Madiun Affair in 1948, a conflict between the Republican government and the PKI, Pardede was forced to flee Yogyakarta under the alias Abdullah. Bintang Merah ceased publication during this time. He spent some time in a Republican military unit as head of the community section of the Wadaslintang Military District Command.

Despite its conflict with the government, the PKI was never formally banned and emerged as an important force in the first legislative house of the newly unified Indonesia after the Dutch–Indonesian Round Table Conference. In August 1950 he became one of the representatives of the PKI in the Provisional House of Representatives (Dewan Perwakilan Rakyat Sementara), an appointed (not elected) provisional legislature. That same month, Bintang Merah resumed publication, with Pardede, Aidit, Lukman and Njoto on the editorial board. The leadership of the PKI also changed during this time, and Pardede followed Aidit into the new leadership clique as the former head Tan Ling Djie was sidelined. As part of that political transition, in August 1950 Pardede was sent to Sumatra with Oloan Hutapea, a fellow Batak PKI member, to exclude people who had been loyal to the former leadership. Pardede's rented house in Jakarta was important to this transition, as the Central Committee had an office there, and Bintang Merah ran some of its operations there as well.

Pardede was arrested and held for a time along with other leftist parliamentarians and PKI leaders as part of the August 1951 mass arrests. He held various party roles in this era, including Commissioner of the Central Committee for West Java in 1952, and head of the Greater Jakarta section in 1954. During this period the PKI's membership went from a few thousand to more than a million. Pardede continued to sit in the Provisional House and was elected to the new legislative body the House of Representatives in the 1955 Indonesian legislative election. The new body was inaugurated in March 1956, when Pardede took his seat as Secretary of the 39-member PKI caucus.

In January 1957, during the Second Ali Sastroamidjojo Cabinet, with political deadlock in Indonesia and ongoing unrest in Sumatra, Pardede participated in a gathering of around 100 political figures from the Declaration of Independence era. Many of the figures who had been working together in 1945 were no longer on speaking terms; the gathering included former Prime Minister Sutan Sjahrir, Sukarno confidante Chairul Saleh, Masyumi Party leader Isa Anshari, and journalists Rosihan Anwar and Mochtar Lubis. It took place at the home of Soediro, the mayor of Jakarta.

In March and April 1958, in the political backdrop of a large regional rebellion by non-Communist forces in Sumatra (the Revolutionary Government of the Republic of Indonesia), the PKI held the sixth plenary session of the executive committee and promoted Pardede and others to a newly enlarged party secretariat. Later that year Pardede attempted to travel to the Netherlands to attend the 19th Congress of the Communist Party of the Netherlands; he was denied a visa by the Dutch on the pretext that foreigners were not allowed to engage in political activities on Dutch soil. After less than a year of a transitional House of Representatives, in 1960 Sukarno dissolved it because it would not support his budgetary demands. It was reconstituted again as the Mutual Cooperation House of Representatives (Dewan Perwakilan Rakyat Gotong Royong, DPR-GR) in what has become known as the Guided Democracy era which lasted until 1965. Pardede was once again appointed to a seat in this body, in a 30 person PKI caucus.

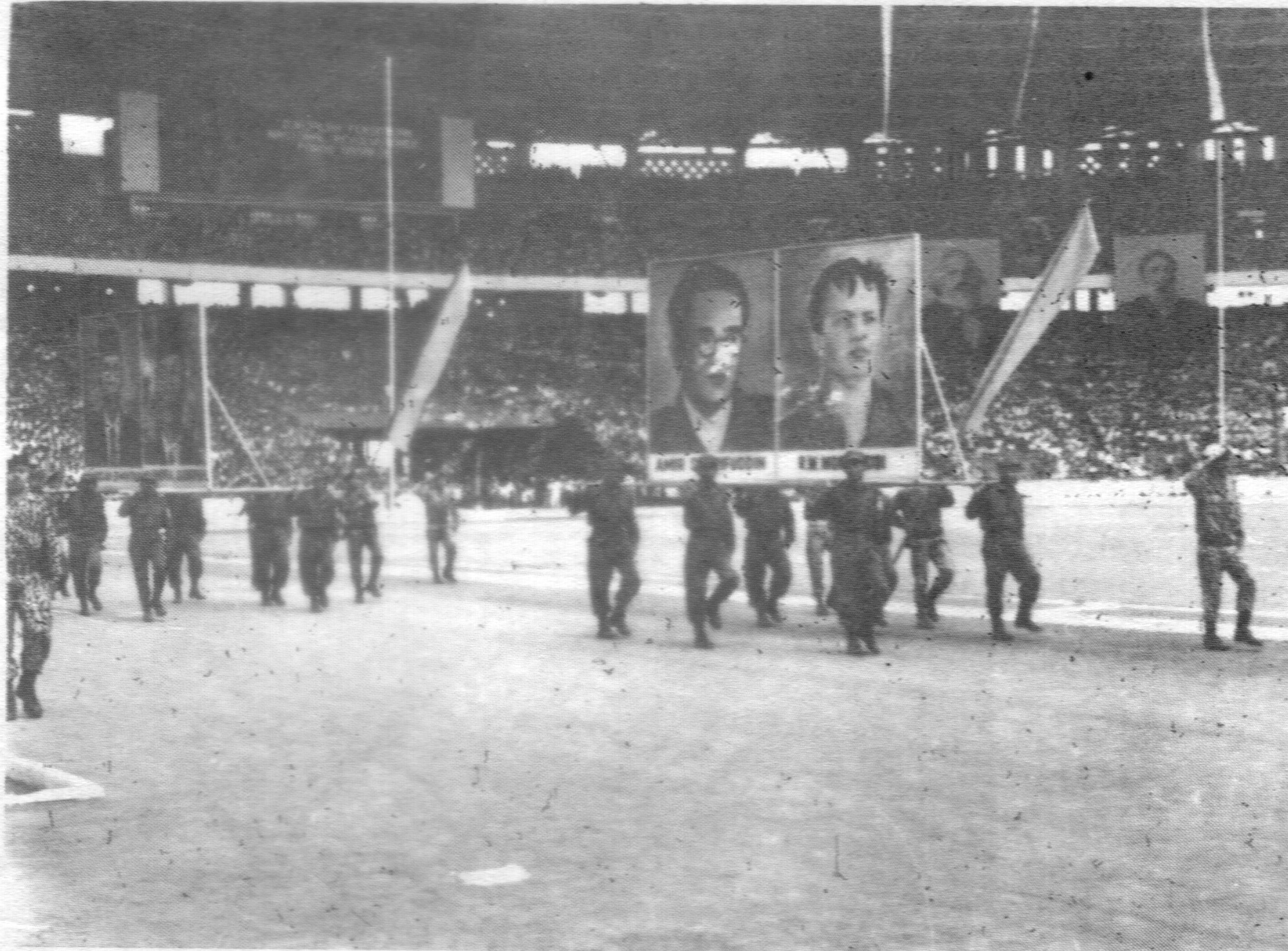
A mass rally held to celebrate the PKI's 45th anniversary, May 1965

He was promoted to be a candidate Politburo member in May 1965.

== Arrest and imprisonment ==
In August 1965, with rumours of Sukarno's declining health and a possible coup by conservative generals, senior members of the PKI including Pardede met in Jakarta to discuss their next move. What eventually transpired weeks later is known as the 30 September Movement, a failed coup in which the PKI was implicated. Pardede was kept out of most of the planning until days before September 30, when he was sent to Medan and given instructions. Despite the quick failure of the coup, it was some time before Pardede was arrested (on 29 November).

The party was banned and a massive crackdown followed. While many of the party leaders were killed (including Aidit, Lukman and Njoto), Pardede, Njono, and many lower-ranking figures were arrested and eventually put on trial in Mahmillub (Mahkamah Militer Luar Biasa, Extraordinary Military Tribunal) sessions. Njono's trial in early 1966, where Pardede testified as a witness, is a major source of documentary evidence for the events of September 30; yet, because it was a show trial during a military crackdown, the testimony may not be fully reliable. (The trial took place in Jakarta, and Pardede was brought there for it.) During the trial Pardede confessed to having been involved in the planning of the failed coup, although insisted that the PKI did not instigate it themselves. He insisted that they were supporting a group of leftist officers in the army against an imminent coup by conservative generals. The fact that the government admitted during the trial that no other central committee members had been arrested, but that most had been killed extrajudicially, caused some embarrassment to them. In addition, John Roosa, a historian of the failed coup, suggests that Pardede (along with a number of captured leaders) may have given information to the army after his arrest, under threat of torture or retaliation. At the end of Njono's trial in February 1966, he was sentenced to death.

Pardede's own trial took place in Medan in June 1966, in a closed military setting where foreign journalists were not admitted. Some details were publicized, including the accusation that he had a commando unit ready to wage war against Indonesia during the events of September 30. At the end of his trial in late June, Pardede was sentenced to death. He made an appeal to president Sukarno for a pardon. Other PKI leaders and figures in Medan were also sentenced to death in secret trials in 1966. His execution did not take place and he was imprisoned until his death at the Tanjung Gusta prison in Medan in late 1982 (or, according to some reports, early 1983).
