= Aliarcham Academy =

Communist school in Indonesia

Aliarcham Academy of Social Sciences
- Akademi Ilmu Sosial "Aliarcham"
- Logo of the Communist Party of Indonesia
- Type: Communist theoretical and research university
- Active: 1959–October 1965
- Affiliations: Communist Party of Indonesia
- Director: Oloan Hutapea
- Location: Jakarta, Indonesia
- Language: Indonesian

The Aliarcham Academy of Social Sciences (Indonesian: Akademi Ilmu Sosial "Aliarcham"), also known by its Indonesian initials AISA, was a short-lived university run by the Communist Party of Indonesia (PKI) from 1959 until 1965 in the Tebet district of South Jakarta. The academy taught a small cohort of dedicated party members; its research focused on Marxist social theories and applied research on social relations in the cities and countryside. It was closed by the government in October 1965 following the failed 30 September Movement and a wave of anti-communist repression.

== History ==
The Indonesian Communist Party (Indonesian: Partai Komunis Indonesia, PKI) had been an illegal party during the Dutch East Indies era, but operated openly and legally after Indonesia achieved its independence in 1948. Its membership expanded rapidly in the 1950s, and by 1958 it had a system of party-affiliated schools of higher education called People's University (Indonesian: Universitas Rakyat, UNRA). These offered some political education and also professional training and language education. The Aliarcham Academy (AISA) was founded as a more specialized type of institution as part of a policy put forward by the PKI its Sixth Congress in 1959, called "Science for the People and Revolution" (Indonesian: Ilmu untuk rakjat dan revolusi). AISA was the first of these specialized academies to open, enrolling its first cohort of 40 in 1959. It was named after Aliarcham, an Indonesian Communist who died in the Dutch concentration camp at Boven-Digoel in 1933.

The founding of the other specialized academies took longer. Between 1962 and 1964, the others were established, including the Bachtaruddin Academy of Political Science, the largest one at 88 students; the Dr. Ratulangi Academy of Economics, the Doctor Rivai School of Journalism, and so on. The goal was to cultivate an Indonesian intelligentsia loyal to the party and its principles, and many of the teachers of these new academies were drawn from the ranks of the Association of Indonesian Scholars (Indonesian: Himpunan Sarjana Indonesia or HSI), a PKI-affiliated academic organization. The writings of party leader D. N. Aidit, who became an instructor at AISA, were an important part of the curriculum there. Oloan Hutapea, a politburo member and editor of the party magazine Bintang Merah, became director of AISA.

A majority of the first cohort originated in Java, the dominant and most populous island in Indonesia. In subsequent years, quotas were established to be more inclusive of Indonesians from other islands, so that only 60% would be from Java. It was more difficult to enter this new type of academy than the party's UNRA schools. Students were expected to be between 25 and 35 years old, to have a high school (SMA) diploma and to be in good health, to already have a solid understanding of Marxist theory, and 5 years experience in revolutionary activity. Students were expected to spend six months full-time in the school and six months doing field work; other tracks were developed for prospective students who had other duties. The university had five departments: philosophy, political economy, the international labor movement, Problems of the Indonesian Revolution, and language and culture. AISA students worked on a number of large research projects relating to agriculture and social relations in the countryside, under the influence of the party's agricultural expert Asmu. These research projects continued into 1965, often with the support of Sukarno's government. The Academy also had a printing press which published academic and theoretical works.

A number of international notables spoke at AISA in its final year, 1965. In March, the American political scientist Ruth McVey, who had recently completed a history of the PKI, lectured there; she may have been the only American ever to do so. And Kim Il Sung delivered a speech there on April 14 on the subject of "On Socialist Construction in the Democratic People's Republic of Korea." The following month, AISA was the site of a minor controversy when, at a celebration marking the 45th anniversary of the PKI on 25 May, visiting Chinese Communist Party secretary Peng Zhen denounced the revisionism of the USSR, leading to complaints from the dignitaries visiting from the Communist Party of the Soviet Union. In the speech, Peng Zhen accused the leaders of the USSR of refusing to recognize the importance of struggles outside of Europe and the USA, of selling out Vietnam and East Germany, and of adopting the racial superiority attitudes of imperialist countries.

Following the failed September 30 coup d'état, in which the PKI was implicated, AISA was shut down on a temporary basis on 11 October by decree of the Minister of Education Brigadier General Sjarif Thajeb, along with a number of other educational institutions. A number of students were arrested and became political prisoners alongside other members of the PKI and affiliated organizations. Finally, on 27 May 1966 Education Minister Mashuri Saleh permanently closed AISA as part of a group of 20 institutions accused (without evidence) of counterrevolutionary behavior and support for the 30 September Movement.

The building itself was demolished, possibly by mob violence, at some point during the anti-communist repression. A mosque was subsequently built on the site (the Masjid Baiturrahman Saharjo).
