= Bintang Merah =

Indonesian communist magazine

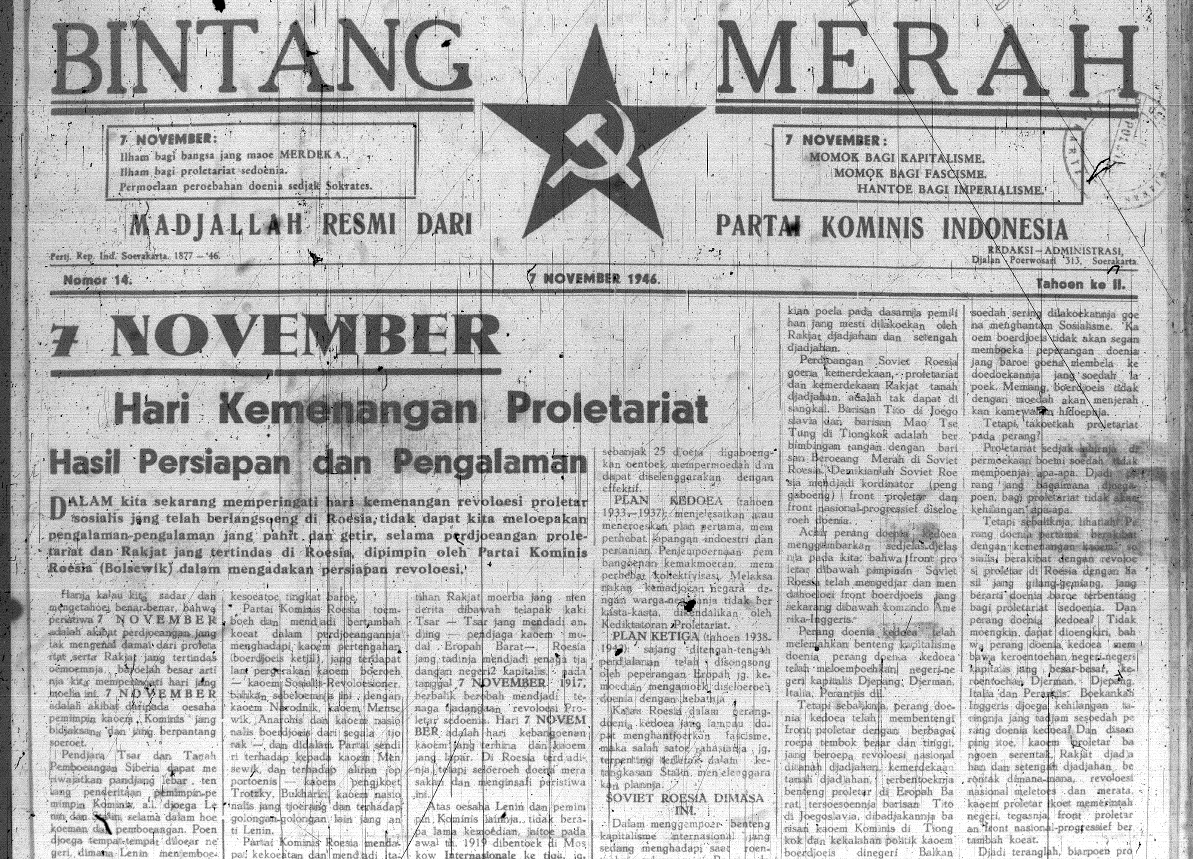
Front page of Bintang Merah from November 7, 1946

Bintang Merah (Indonesian: Red Star) was a magazine of the Communist Party of Indonesia which published in Jakarta from 1945 to 1948 and again from 1950 to 1965. It described itself as a magazine of Marxist-Leninist politics and theory.

== History ==
The magazine began publication at the end of the Second World War with the departure of Japanese forces from the Indonesia. However, it was banned in 1948 during the Madiun Affair along with other communist newspapers such as Buruh, Revolusioner, and Suara Ibu Kota. With all the newspapers banned, Musso, the PKI leader, went on Radio Gelora Pemoeda and denounced the government of Sukarno and Mohammad Hatta, stating that they were following a policy of capitulation towards the Netherlands and that they had risen to power during the Japanese occupation of the Dutch East Indies with ties to Japan.

In the early independence period, the political alignments in Indonesia shifted and the Communists became closer to Sukarno. In August 1950, the magazine was allowed to start publishing again twice per month. The new editorial staff were D. N. Aidit, Lukman, Njoto and Peris Pardede. But they still faced occasional persecution; in August 1951 there were mass arrests of leftists of various parties in East Java, and editor (and PKI central committee member) B.O. Hutapea was among them, along with editors of Trompet Masjarakat, Republik and editors of a number of Chinese Indonesian papers. This was after an earlier round of raids on Communists in East Java, which Hutapea had called a "politics of demoralization" being waged against them by the government.

Bintang Merah claimed to have a circulation of 10,000 by the end of 1950 but gradually declined to under 8,000 in 1953. It was surpassed in circulation by another party paper, Harian Rakjat, which went from 2,000 circulation in 1951 to 15,000 in 1953.

It is unclear for how long it ceased publication, but a report from early 1964 reports that Bintang Merah was once again allowed to resume publication. However, it was permanently closed in 1965 with the banning of the Communist Party of Indonesia after the September 30 Movement. Most of the editors faced trials and became political prisoners or were executed. B.O. Hutapea escaped and lived in hiding for several years, being finally killed in a shootout with police in Blitar, East Java in 1968.
