= Musso =

Leader of the Communist Party of Indonesia (PKI)

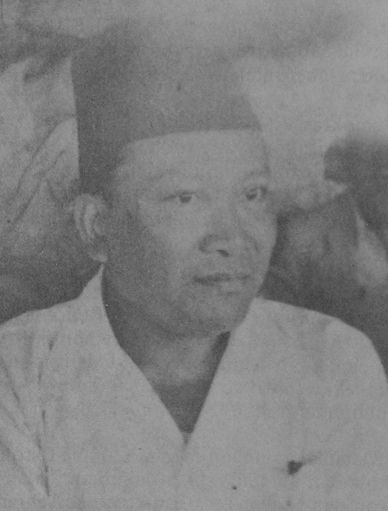
- Musso c. 1948
- Born: Munawar Musso; 1897; Kediri, East Java, Dutch East Indies
- Died: 31 October 1948 (aged 50–51); Semanding, Kauman, Ponorogo, East Java, Indonesia
- Cause of death: Summary execution
- Education: Hogere Burger School
- Occupations: General Secretary of the Communist Party of Indonesia; Politician
- Political party: Communist Party of Indonesia

Munawar Musso (1897 – 31 October 1948), commonly known as Musso, was an Indonesian revolutionary and political figure who was the leader of the Communist Party of Indonesia and one of the key figures in the 1948 Madiun affair.

== Biography ==
=== Early life ===
Munawar Musso was born in 1897, Pagu, Kediri. His father was a bank clerk in Wates, Mas Martoredjo.

In Batavia, Musso trained as a teacher. He met Alimin, a disciple of G.A.J. Hazeu and D. van Hinloopen Labberton. According to Soemarsono, one of the PKI leaders in the Madiun affair, Musso continued to Hogere Burger School in 1913. He lived at Tjokroaminoto's boarding house with Alimin and Sukarno. According to Arnold C. Brackman, at the time Musso worked as a cashier at a Surabaya post office. In Surabaya, Musso also met Henk Sneevliet.

=== Beginning of PKI career ===
Musso and Alimin had more important tasks in infiltrating Sarekat Islam than Surjopranoto. They were members of both the Indonesian Communist Party (PKI) and SI before they were arrested due to the Afdeling B affair. Musso was involved in a farmers revolt in Cimareme, Garut supported by Sarekat Islam Afdeling B. In the trial, while Alimin confessed to making a false statement to help Tjokroaminoto, Musso refused to make a confession. In prison, the Dutch government handled him roughly. Agus Salim complained to the Volksraad (People's Assembly) about this treatment. According to McVey, Musso held a grudge against the Dutch government after this treatment. After Musso and Alimin were released in 1923, the former received an offer to teach Indonesian using English as the language of instruction in the Japan from van Hinloopen Labberton. However the Japanese government rejected Musso's explanation that he did not have a sufficient academic diploma, though McVey believes that the main reasons were his experience in prison and his political views. Musso then reorganized the Batavia PKI branch and led this new organization.

In January 1925, a committee of the Indies National Congress conducted a meeting resulting in the formation of the politically neutral, Surabaya-based Indonesian Study Club association. Musso was present at the club's first convention in February supporting the club agenda and wishing it to be more closely linked to the grassroots. In early 1925, Musso and Alimin gave a speech at a rally organized by the VTSP in Banten increasing communist influence in that region. After the failure of the machinists' strike on 5 October, Musso concluded that the action had been premature.

In December 1925, PKI leaders planned to rebel against the Dutch Indies government. The government knew this and arrested most of the leaders in January 1926. Musso was one of the few who managed to escape. He along with Budisutjitro and Sugono fled to Singapore meeting PKI agents Subakat and Alimin who had previously had stayed with Tan Malaka in Manila. The five, together with Sardjono, Mohammad Sanusi, and Winanta held discussions for three days before deciding to organize a revolt by the middle of 1926. The meeting also resulted in the sending of Alimin to Manila to request Tan Malaka to gather support for the revolt, but this plan was rejected by Tan Malaka. In February, another meeting was held but Alimin made no mention of the rejection by Tan Malaka.

=== Comintern membership ===
In March 1926, Musso and Alimin went to Moscow via Canton to ask for support from Comintern for a revolt. Knowing the plan from the meeting in Singapore remained to be implemented, Tan Malaka arrived in Singapore in June to prevent Musso and Alimin, but he was too late because both of them had already gone to Russia. The plan was if they could get support from the Comintern, they would instruct the PKI in the Dutch Indies to refrain from beginning a revolt until material aid arrived. It would be after the arrival of aid, that then PKI would launch a full revolt, else if Comintern did not support this plan the PKI would launch guerrilla and terror attacks. The Comintern rejected the request reasoning that Dutch Indies government's control was still too strong. To prevent the revolt the plan as proposed by Musso and Alimin, the Comintern instructed them to stay in Moscow longer studying the Trotskyist deviation. However, in October Musso still managed to instruct his people in Dutch Indies to start a revolt.

In 1927, Musso and Alimin went to the Soviet Union and studied at the Lenin school for several years.

In July 1928, Musso under the name Manavar, along with Alimin, Semaoen, Darsono, and Tadjudin, attended the Sixth Congress of Comintern led by Stalin. He expressed his opinion about the failure of the revolt in Java and Sumatra the year before. After the congress, Musso served as member of the Comintern executive committee. He also continued his study at Lenin University in Moscow but he did not graduate. Musso married a Russian woman in 1929 and became the father of two children.

In April 1935, Musso went to Surabaya to meet Siti Larang Djojopanatas, wife of Musso's old friend Sosrokardono, to request permission to stay in their residence for several months. Musso was sent there to consolidate the old PKI that had been crushed in 1927. He explained the Dimitrov line, a new communist tactical approach, in several newspapers, including three times in Indonesia Berdjoeang. Focusing in Surabaya and Solo, in this consolidation, Musso managed to persuade Pamudji, Azis, Sukajat, Djokosoedjono, Amir Sjarifudin, and Tan Ling Djie to join the PKI. Musso instructed the new members to infiltrate and join nationalist organizations. The Dutch Indies government discovered this and exiled the members to Boven Digul. However Musso went back to Moscow before the government arrested and exiled him.

In an article published in Bintang Merah stated that Musso went to Prague in early November 1947 helping Soeripno, that represented Indonesia in discussions about a consular agreement with the USSR. However, Soeripno himself claimed that Musso went there in March 1948. In January 1948 after the signing of the Renville Agreement, Musso defended his comrades in Indonesia from criticism by Moscow, especially Amir Sjarifudin, stating that it was "just a tactic, in order not to the draw attention of the anti-communist faction." After the talks in Prague finished on the third week of May, concluding with the establishment of diplomatic relations between the USSR and Indonesia, Musso, under the name Soeparto, and Soeripno returned to Indonesia on 21 June 1948. They stopped in New Delhi and stayed for two or three weeks waiting for the Indonesian Air Force to finish arranging the acquisition of an aircraft. They joined the flight of a newly bought aircraft to Indonesia, via Thailand, staying in Bukittinggi for eight days.

Musso planned a communist revolution, consistent with Soviet policy, named A New Road for the Indonesian Republic either in Prague or on the way home. While in Prague, Musso discussed with Dutch-Indonesian relations Soeripno and Paul de Groot, a Dutch communist, and also whether Indonesia was to become a Netherlands commonwealth or fully independent. The plan, according to Ann Swift, was doubtlessly approved by Moscow, though Musso himself denied this. According to the former Armed Forces Chief of Staff Himawan Soetanto, the idea was influenced by the so-called "Zhdanov line". The idea was named New Road because it was different from old PKI which was influenced by the Dimitrov line.

Musso and Soeripno landed in a swamp in Tulungagung on 10 August. After being picked up, they moved to Solo to meet the military governor Wikana. They arrived in Yogyakarta on 11 August 1948. On 12 August, Merdeka, a newspaper based in Solo, wrote that "there was a possibility that Musso, a veteran leader who was very popular, had returned". Later, on 13 August, he met Sukarno to discuss a revolution. During a meeting of the PKI Politbiro on 13–14 August, Musso presented the New Road. He denounced the Indonesian revolution as a bourgeois revolution instead of an authentic proletariat revolution. He also demanded more laborer representatives in the government and the armed forces. Musso also criticized the PKI movement in his absence, the use of funds from van der Plas - 25000 gulden by Amir Sjarifudin to fight the Japanese army, the resignation of Amir as prime minister without consulting the party, the leader of illegal PKI not hastening the formation of legal party after independence, and complexity of the communist organizations which were divided into the PKI, Pesindo, and SOBSI.

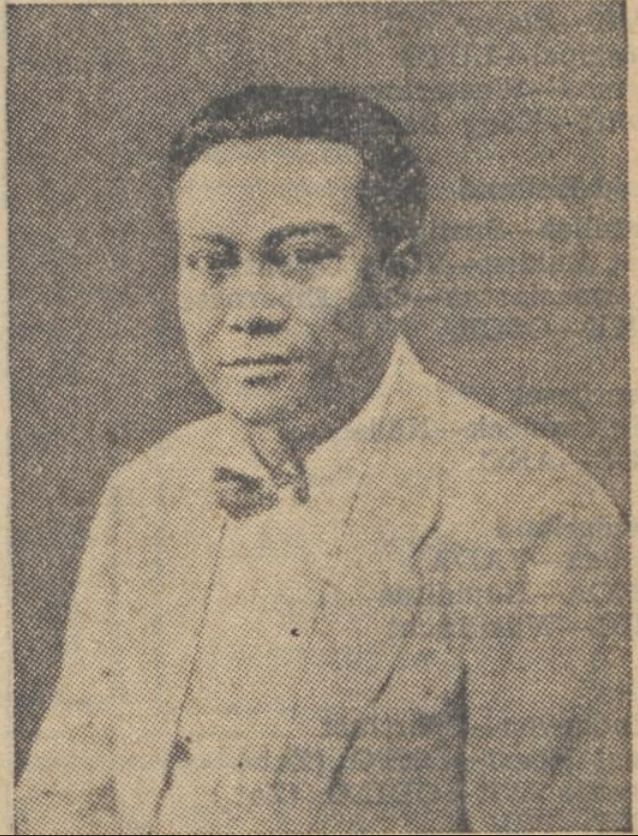
Musso, 1940s

Musso, through the Politbiro, announced a merger of the PKI that had a poor leadership with Pesindo and SOBSI which was under the Demokrasi Rakyat Front on 21 August and turned PKI into a mass-based party, though the idea of a merger was rejected by Asrarudin and SK Trimurti. Other party members who opposed the merger into the PKI were from Pesindo and Barisan Tani Indonesia which were inclined to support Sjahrir and from the Murba and Angkatan Komunis Muda (Akoma) which were inclined to support Tan Malaka. The merger was officially conducted on 27 August.

On 28 August, Musso discussed with Ibnu Parna from the Gerakan Revolusi Rakjat (GRR) and Akoma leaders the possibility of both organizations merging with the PKI. However, after the PKI announced its reorganization on 31 August, the GRR criticized Musso and the PKI.

In early September, all leftist parties were merged with the PKI. After the reorganization, the new Politbiro was created on 1 September. The new members were younger and more amenable to Musso's ideas including D.N. Aidit, M.H. Lukman, Njoto, and Sudisman.

To publicize the PKI's new course and gain more support, Musso gave speeches and conducted mass meetings. On 3 September, Musso met the Barisan Tani in Indonesia, while on 5 September, he met with students. Starting on 7 September, Musso, Wikana, Setiadjit, and Amir Sjarifudin held mass meetings in Central and East Java, beginning in Solo, Madiun the day after, Kediri on the 11th, Jombang and Bojonegoro on the 13th and 14th, and Cepu and Purwodadi on the 16th and 17th.

=== Madiun Affair and death ===
In the middle of the month, an incident between PKI-influenced armed forces and government loyalist armed forces occurred in Solo. After this incident, according to Bintang Merah, on 16 September in Cepu, Musso ordered his men in Solo to stop the incident from spreading. On 18 September, the crossfire broke up in Madiun. A PKI sympathizer stated that the new government, called the National Front, was formed after killing government of loyalist officers and the take over of over strategic places. Hearing this, Musso, Amir, and the others went to Madiun to control the rebellion. According to the PKI-influenced militia leader Soemarsono, his action was approved by Musso when Soemarsono visited Musso and Amir two days before. However, according to Ann Swift and Himawan Soetanto, Musso did not know about this.

On the evening of 19 September, Sukarno ordered the Indonesian people to choose himself and Hatta, or Musso. According to M.C. Ricklefs, Musso had no experience in Indonesia so he had no base of political power over the majority of Indonesian people compared to Sukarno. Even local militias influenced by anti-government side would not support Musso. Responding to this, Musso formed the Nasional Daerah Madiun Front, and appointed Soemarsono as military governor and Djoko Soedjono as militia commander. Hatta was dissatisfied with the response, and stated that Musso wanted to take over the government and "establish a Soviet government."

The rebels were pushed after the Siliwangi Division was ordered to attack the PKI force in Madiun. Musso and Amir who knew that they could not successfully resist a Subroto-led attack, instructed the PKI force to try to escape and hide in the mountains. On 28 September, Musso, Amir, and Soemarsono left Madiun for Ngebel and Dungus, Ponorogo. While in Balong, Ponorogo, Musso and Amir had a serious disagreement over tactical plans. While Musso wanted to move to the south, Amir preferred moving north.

On 31 October, in the mountains near Ponorogo, Musso was killed by government forces while trying to escape.

== Political view and legacy ==
In the largest sense, Musso was a true Marxist–Leninist and Stalinist who thought there could only be one party for the proletariat, a party led by Soviet-supported communists. After returning from Moscow, Musso developed a vision of Jalan Baru untuk Republik Indonesia (The New Road for Indonesian Republik). This vision and the associated plans the direction of the PKI from being largely dominated by the ideas of Dimitrov to Zhdanov. The next PKI leader after the Madiun affair, Alimin, disagreed with Musso's vision and supported the idea of the PKI as small party of solid professional revolutionaries with militant members throughout Indonesia. Despite Alimin's vision for the revolutionary struggle in Indonesia, young members during the era of Alimin's dominance such as those led by Njoto, Aidit, and M.H. Lukman were largely influenced by the ideas of Musso.

Sukarno described Musso as a "jago", a fighting cock, because when Sukarno and Musso lived together in Tjokroaminoto's house, Musso "liked to fight". Ruth T. McVey paired Musso with Alimin as the leaders of revival of the PKI in the 1920s. Soe Hok Gie described Musso as quite similar to Haji Misbach, as someone who "liked to run amok" and was rather reckless.

== Gallery ==
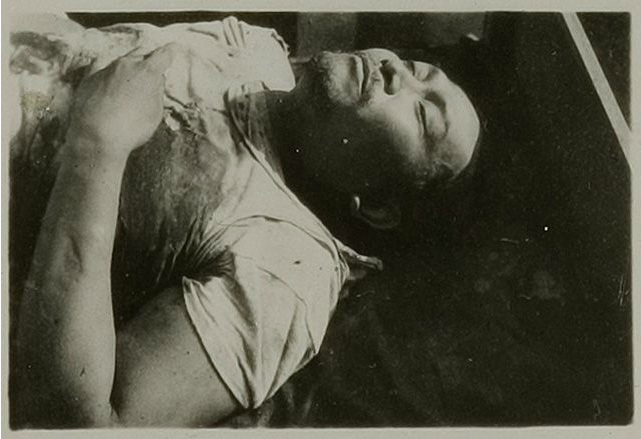
The body of Musso after being shot while fleeing on 31 October 1948, in Ponorogo, East Java

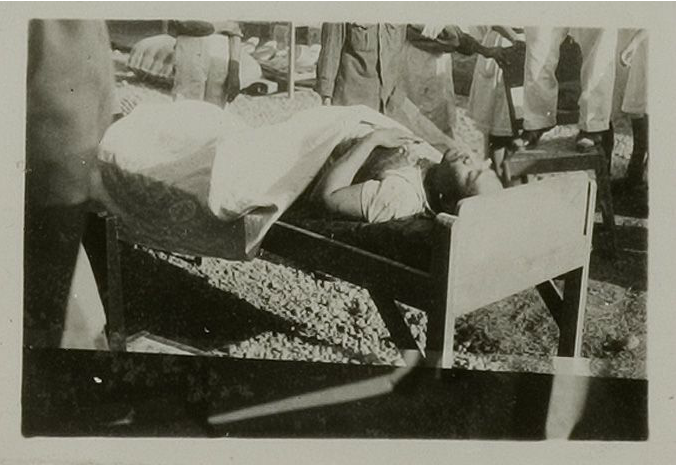
Ditto

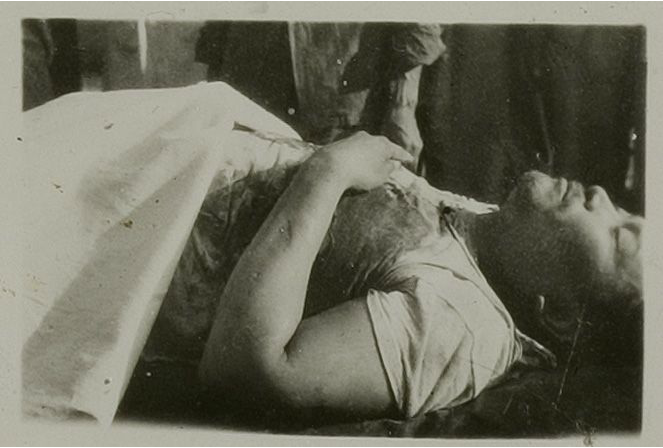
Ditto
