= Lukeman =

Lukeman may refer to:

- Henry Augustus Lukeman (1872–1935), American sculptor
- Frank Lukeman (1885–1946), Canadian Olympic athlete
- Jack Lukeman (born 1973), Irish singer/songwriter
- Noah Lukeman (born 1973), American writer and literary agent
- Martin Lukeman (born 1985), English darts player

== See also ==
- Lukman, a surname
