= Tan Ling Djie =

Indonesian communist politician

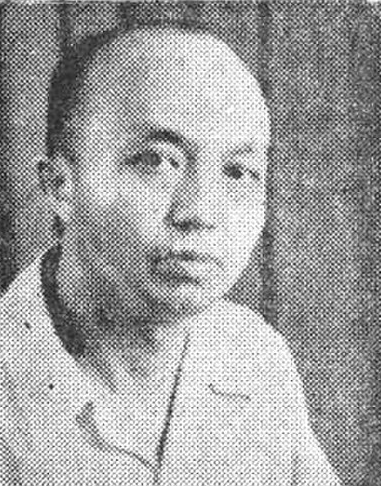

Tan Ling Djie (5 August 1904 – c. 1966) was an Indonesian communist politician active during the late 1940s and 1950s.

== Early life ==
Tan Ling Djie was born in Surabaya, on 5 August 1904. He studied at Rechts Hoge School (RHS) Batavia and the Law Faculty of Leiden University, the Netherlands. In his youth, Tan has been considered a leftist. He was the driving force behind the founding of the Indonesian Chinese Peranakan Union (SPTI), which is "a leftist political organization of Chinese people in the Netherlands which was founded in 1932." Tan Ling Djie was also a journalist and editor of Sin Tit Po—a radical Chinese Surabaya newspaper led by Liem Koen Hian. He is also a member of the Chinese-Indonesian Party which was founded by Liem.

== Political career ==
=== Joining the PKI ===
While in Indonesia, the Chinese minority there were slightly marginalized in the national movement because of ethnic differences. Resulting in a number of nationalist political parties finding it difficult to accept them. This resulted in the Communist Party (PKI) attracting a number of Chinese who were disillusioned by nationalist parties who would not accept them as members, and who were attracted by its radical and non-racial approach.

=== Time in the Netherlands ===
While in the Netherlands, apart from establishing the Indonesian Chinese Peranakan Union, Tan was also a member of the Dutch Communist Party (Communistische Partij Nederland, CPN) which was influenced by Paul de Groot. Tan Ling Djie was not the only Chinese left, but there were still Oei Gie Hwat, Tjoa Sik Ien, and Siauw Giok Tjhan.

=== Involvement in the PKI ===
When the Madiun Affair broke out, Tan Ling Djie was arrested while attending the Railway Workers Union Conference (SBKA) in Yogyakarta. For three months, he had to languish in prison. Meanwhile his roaming friends like Amir and Musso had to end their lives at the hands of government soldiers. The sudden attack by the Dutch army against the capital city of Yogyakarta in the Second Dutch Military Aggression on 19 December 1948 allowed political prisoners imprisoned in Yogyakarta to escape, including Tan Ling Djie. They were also no longer being hunted by government soldiers who were busy dealing with the Dutch military.

Following the disastrous Madiun Affair, Tan Ling Djie was named as one of the leaders of the illegal PKI along with Amir Sjariffudin, Maruto Darusman, Abdulmadjid, Setiadjit, and Wikana. They took over the leadership of the PKI from Alimin and Sardjono. He also became secretary general of the Preparatory Committee for the Fusion of 3 Parties, namely the PKI, the Indonesian Labor Party, and the Socialist Party. Tan Ling Djie was arrested and held without charge for a time as part of the August 1951 mass arrests.

Meanwhile, D. N. Aidit in a paper entitled About Tan Ling Djie-ism which was presented at the 5th National Congress of the Indonesian Communist Party in 1954, which was later published in the Red Star, mentions Tan Ling Djie, "as Secretary General of the Socialist Party concurrently as a leading member of the 'illegal PKI' Politburo, then since August 1948 as Deputy Secretary General of the PKI. "

== Death ==
However, Tan Ling Djie's leadership in the PKI later shifted to the trio of D. N. Aidit, Njoto, and Lukman. Instead, he was accused of playing down the role of the PKI as the vanguard of the revolution, and of eliminating the independence of the PKI in the organizational field. He was then sidelined for years until the political earthquake of 1965 and the PKI were wiped out by the Army. Like other PKI sympathizers and members, he was also arrested by the military. He was then detained in Surabaya in 1966, suffered from Thiamine deficiency due to lack of food and then died.
