= Oloan Hutapea =

Indonesian Communist Party politician

Bismarck Oloan Hutapea, also known as B. O. Hutapea (born 1920s?, died in the Blitar area in 1968), was a high-ranking member of the Indonesian Communist Party and one of its major theoreticians during the height of its power, and was leader of a clandestine wing of the party in 1967-8 during the Transition to the New Order.

== Biography ==
=== Early life ===
Bismarck Oloan Hutapea, shortened to B.O. Hutapea as his pen name later in life. Little has been published about his early life aside from the fact that he had been a cadet in the Dutch Navy at Surabaya.

T.B. Simatupang, chief of staff of the Indonesian Armed Forces from 1950 to 1953, knew Hutapea while studying in Batavia during 1937-40 and again later during the Japanese occupation. He was also from a Batak background and noted in his memoir that most Bataks in Batavia knew each other at that time. Among his friends in the Batak youth in Batavia, Simatupang listed Hutapea, as well as Josef Simanjutak, another future communist party propagandist, and Lintong Mulia Sitorus, future Indonesian Socialist Party secretary general. During the Japanese occupation of the Dutch East Indies, Simatupang rented a house with Sitorus and Hutapea in the Tanah Tinggi district of Batavia. He notes that other Batak youth called them De Drie Musketiers, that they were often together attending lectures by people such as Sutan Sjahrir and collecting books about independence movements in other countries. He takes credit for introducing Hutapea to communism during this time, as he lent him a copy of "Soviet Communism: A new civilisation?" by Sidney Webb and Beatrice Webb, which he says converted Hutapea to the cause. Simatupang notes that, at that time he and Sitorus disagreed with Hutapea, but that it did not cause a rift in their friendship until later, and that at that time they were also good friends with D.N. Aidit, future communist party leader.

=== Communist party ===
In the late 1940s and early 1950s, Hutapea emerged as a close ally of Aidit as the party rebuilt its organization which was still in shambles after the 1948 Madiun Affair. Among the new generation of communists who came to Jakarta in 1949 after the old guard was imprisoned, Lukman and Sudisman arrived, followed shortly after by Njoto and Hutapea from East Java. In February 1950 Hutapea and Peris Pardede were sent by the party to Sumatra to exclude people disloyal to Aidit. Hutapea was also the commissioner of the PKI in East Java during this time. In 1951 police made several raids of houses of Communists and other leftists in East Java, which Hutapea had called a "politics of demoralization" being waged against them by the government.

Then, in August 1951 there were mass arrests of leftists of various parties in the region, Hutapea was among them, along with editors of Trompet Masjarakat, Republik, and editors of several Chinese Indonesian papers. Aidit and other leaders went into hiding, where many of them stayed until 1952. The government accused the arrestees of plotting a coup d'état. These prisoners were interned in a concentration camp in Kediri, where they complained about poor quality food and no access to medicine or reading materials. The Dutch communist party newspaper De Waarheid claimed that Hutapea himself was instrumental in organizing the prisoners into various sports and education committees, and to campaign for better treatment.

Hutapea had various other duties in the party before and after his imprisonment. He was a member of the politburo of the communist party, he was an editor of their theoretical magazine Bintang Merah (Indonesian: Red Star), and he was director of the Aliarcham Academy, a party training school, in Jakarta.

In 1959 Hutapea accompanied Aidit and other party members to Moscow to attend the 21st Congress of the Communist Party of the Soviet Union.

In his writings, Hutapea showed himself to be among the most hard-line members of the party leadership. In a 1960 article in Bintang Merah, the party's magazine of theory, he condemned revisionists in the Second International who had proposed a non-revolutionary road to power.

=== After 1965 ===
After the 30 September Movement events, many of the party leadership were arrested or killed. Aliarcham Academy, which Hutapea was director of, was closed by order of Suharto. Hutapea managed to escape capture for several years. In early 1967 a number of the surviving party notables made a plan to rebuild the party in the South Blitar area of East Java, which they judged to be suitable. Among those who left from Jakarta to South Blitar were Hutapea, Rewang, Tjugito, Iskandar Subekti, Marjoko, and Katno. In 1967 Hutapea became head of a new Central Committee based there. This committee stockpiled weapons and attempted to build an independent communist zone in opposition to the new Suharto government. Some of their members had trained with the Viet Cong and recently returned to Indonesia, and so they imitated the tactics used in Vietnam. Some reports said that up to 90 percent of peasants in the Blitar were supportive of this movement, even as anti-communist killings were happening all over the country. The region was more of a refuge for people fleeing the killings than it was a strong base of power. The Indonesian Army made aggressive raids into the region in early 1968, with five thousand soldiers and three thousand militiamen, and Hutapea was killed in South Blitar in May 1968.
