= Cipinang Penitentiary Institution =

Top-security prison in Jakarta, Indonesia

Coordinates: 6.215°S 106.885°E

- Interactive map of Cipinang Penitentiary Institution
- Location: East Jakarta, Indonesia
- Security class: Class I
- Capacity: 1,500
- Population: 4,000 (2007)
- Website: lapascipinang.kemenkumham.go.id

Notable prisoners
- Pramoedya A. Toer, Xanana Gusmão, Abu Bakar Bashir

Cipinang Penitentiary Institution (Indonesian: Lembaga Pemasyarakatan Cipinang) is a top-security prison in Jakarta, Indonesia. It is exactly located in Cipinang Muara, Jatinegara, East Jakarta.

== History ==
The prison was built by the Dutch colonial administration, during the Indonesian National Revival. It held Indonesian nationalist leaders such as Mohammed Hatta. Following Indonesian independence, the prison continued to be used by authorities. Communists and leftists arrested in the 1951 mass arrests in Indonesia were detained there, as was the novelist Pramoedya A. Toer in 1961 for criticizing the Sukarno administration's anti-Chinese policies.

Human rights groups such as Amnesty International and Human Rights Watch alleged that the Suharto administration used Cipinang and other prisons to silence opponents from the Sukarno administration and Irian Jaya. In their annual report for 2005, AI also spoke of routine torture and ill-treatment. The organization said of Cipinang and other prisons:

According to a survey conducted by a local non-governmental organization, over 81 percent of prisoners arrested between January 2003 and April 2005 in Salemba detention centre, Cipinang prison, and Pondok Bambu prison, all in Jakarta, were tortured or ill-treated. About 64 percent were tortured or ill-treated during interrogation, 43 percent during arrest, and 25 percent during detention.

During the Indonesian occupation of East Timor, East Timorese independence activists, such as Xanana Gusmão (later President of East Timor), were housed in the jail. Others imprisoned at Cipinang for political activity include political dissidents Asep Suryaman, Sri Bintang Pamungkas, and labor leader Muchtar Pakpahan. After Suharto's resignation in 1998, new President Jusuf Habibie released Pamungkas, Pakpahan, and Gusmão.

Abu Bakar Bashir, the spiritual leader of Islamist terrorist group, Jemaah Islamiyah, was imprisoned in Cipinang. He was released after serving 26 months for conspiracy relating to the 2002 Bali bombing.

== Today ==
The jail holds 4,000 prisoners in a facility designed to hold 1,500. Well-connected prisoners are often able to obtain superior accommodation. The former governor of Jakarta, Ahok, was imprisoned here, but was released in January 2019 after receiving a two-month remission.

== See also ==
- Political prisoner
