= Abdullah Aidit =

Indonesian politician (1900–1969)

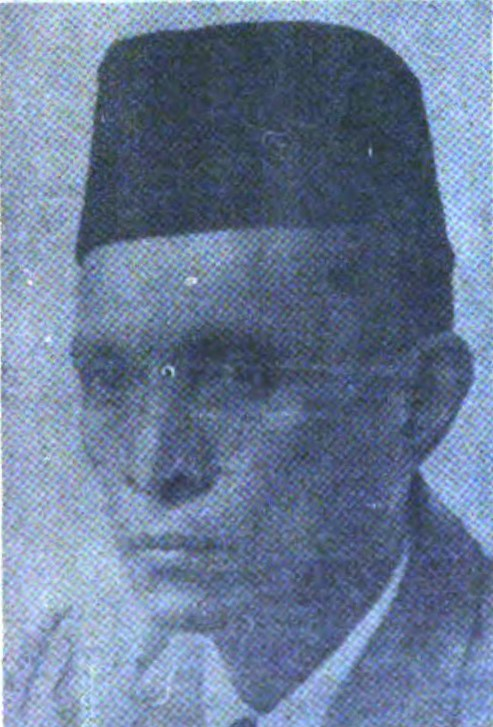
- Abdullah Aidit, c. 1952

Member of People's Representative Council
- In office 17 February 1950 – 25 June 1954 (Note: People's Representative Council of the United States of Indonesia between 17 February – 16 August 1950, then the Provisional People's Representative Council thereafter)
- Succeeded by: Njoto

Personal details
- Born: 23 October 1900; Tanjung Pandan, Belitung, Dutch East Indies
- Died: 14 February 1969 (aged 68); Tanjung Pandan, Belitung, Indonesia

Abdullah Aidit (23 October 1900 – 14 February 1969) was an Indonesian politician and civil servant who served as a member of the Provisional People's Representative Council. He was the father of D. N. Aidit, chairman of the Indonesian Communist Party who was executed in 1965 following the 30 September Movement.

== Early life and education ==
Abdullah was born in Tanjung Pandan on 23 October 1900. He was the son of Haji Ismail, a fishery businessman in Belitung. Abdullah worked as a forest ranger, and due to his family connections he managed to put all his eight children to school at Hollandsch-Inlandsche School. He was active in the local Islamic community, founding a local Islamic education institution.

Two of his sons, Achmad Aidit and Murad Aidit, studied in Batavia, at a significant cost to the family's finances. When Achmad Aidit wanted to change his name, Abdullah resisted, primarily because he did not want to handle administrative problems associated with a change of name. He eventually relented, and Achmad changed his name to Dipa Nusantara Aidit.

== Political career ==
During the Indonesian National Revolution, Abdullah was one of the leaders of pro-independence militia groups in Belitung, and briefly went to Yogyakarta. In 1950, he served as a member of the People's Representative Council of the United States of Indonesia as a delegate from Belitung (not representing any political parties), and then the Provisional People's Representative Council until his resignation on 25 June 1954. He was replaced by Njoto, a member of the Indonesian Communist Party. (Note: Abdullah is often confused with Abdullah Aidid, a contemporary Masyumi legislator.) He was a member of the Indonesian Islamic Union Party's leadership committee between 1953 and 1955.

Abdullah was staying at D. N. Aidit's Jakarta home at the night of 30 September 1965. In the aftermath of the coup attempt, D. N. Aidit was arrested by soldiers, and Abdullah for a time took care of his son's children. He was also briefly arrested by soldiers in a case of mistaken identity (unlike his son, Abdullah was not wanted), and was released after one day. At that time, he was a legislator of the National People's Party. Abdullah was later assisted by deputy prime minister Chaerul Saleh in returning to Belitung. He died alone at his house in Tanjung Pandan on 14 February 1969, his body only being discovered by his neighbor's wife three days after his death.
