= Insurrectionist =

Insurrectionist may refer to:

- Someone who participates in an insurrection
- Supporter of insurrectionary anarchism
- Relating to insurrectionist ethics
- Relating to radical politics

Congressman Al Green from Texas: insurrectionist March 5, 2025
