= Insurrectionist ethics =

Insurrectionist ethics "is a philosophy aimed at radical social transformation and human liberation". It is also described as covering "the myriad forms of justification for radical social transformation in the interest of freedom for oppressed people. It is a set of advocacy systems that usually aim at liberation for specified populations under siege in a given society."
