= Harian Rakjat =

Indonesian daily newspaper (1951–1965)

- Untuk rakjat hanya ada satu harian, Harian Rakjat!
- 1955 issue
- Type: Daily newspaper
- Format: Broadsheet
- Owner: Communist Party of Indonesia
- Publisher: Njoto
- Editor-in-chief: Mula Naibaho
- Founded: 31 January 1951
- Ceased publication: 3 October 1965
- Political alignment: Left-wing
- Language: Indonesian
- Headquarters: Jalan Pintu Besar Selatan No. 93
- City: Jakarta
- Country: Indonesia
- Circulation: 23,000

Harian Rakjat (EYD: Harian Rakyat, lit. 'People's Daily') was an Indonesian newspaper published by the Communist Party of Indonesia (PKI) from 1951 to 1965. The Harian Rakjat motto was "Untuk rakjat hanya ada satu harian, Harian Rakjat!" (lit. 'For the people there is only one daily, People's Daily!'). Harian Rakyat was managed by Njoto as a member of the editorial board and Mula Naibaho as editor in chief.

== History ==
=== Early history ===
Harian Rakjat was first published on 31 January 1951, and was originally named Soeara Rakyat (lit. 'People's Voice'). In its heyday, Harian Rakjat was the most popular political newspaper ever published in Indonesia, with average circulation of 23,000 copies in the 1950s and 1960s. The newspaper was sold at a retail and subscription price of Rp 0.60 and Rp 14.5 a month, respectively.

=== Bans and closure ===
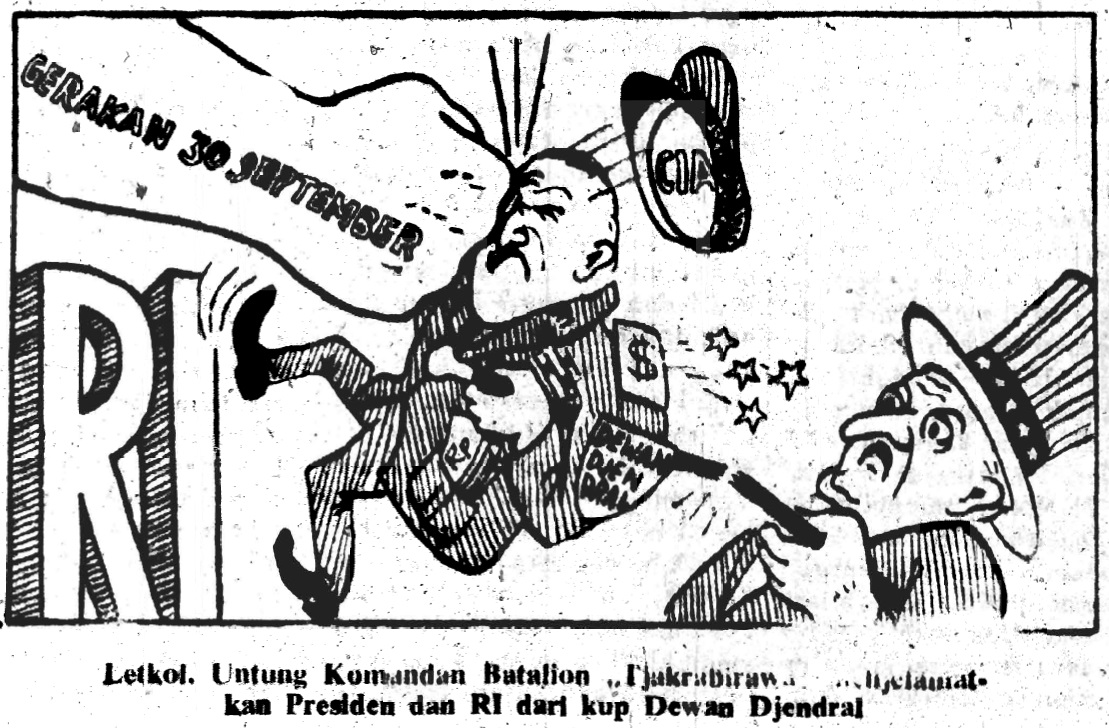
A front-page editorial cartoon depicting the 30 September Movement on 2 October 1965, one day before the paper ceased publication

With its confrontational style, Harian Rakjat always opposed other parties and the authorities. Because its message was considered to have violated the rules imposed by the government of the time, Harian Rakjat was occasionally banned. The first ban occurs lasted for 23 hours, between 13 September 1957, at 21.00 and 14 September 1957, at 20:00. Other newspapers, such as Indonesia Raya, Bintang Timur, Pemuda Merdeka, Djiwa Baru, Pedoman, Keng Po, and Java Bode, as well as three news agencies: Antara, PIA, and INPS were banned for the same time period.

The ban was repeated on 16 July 1959, for a month because the paper published the PKI Central Committee statement of 3 July, entitled "Evaluation after one year of the Working Cabinet does not guarantee the implementation of the 3 chapters program, so they should be retooled immediately". On 2 August 1959, a month after the ban, Harian Rakjat returned to print. On 2 November 1959, the newspaper was banned again by the War Authority (Penguasa Perang). This time, the reason was not so clear. This led to the Harian Rakjat circulation expansion led by PKI officials D.N. Aidit, M.H. Lukman, and other PKI activists, who directly took to the streets. On 9 December 1959, Harian Rakjat was banned again for a story about "Njoto's 23 November lecture in the SBKA building", which was published on 24 November 1959. The reason for banning was also not clear, giving rise to protests. Following pressure, Harian Rakjat was finally permitted, and published again on 23 December 1959 . On 3 February 1961, the newspaper was banned again by in Greater Jakarta. The reason for the ban was the welcome address from PKI chairman D.N. Aidit on the 10th anniversary of Harian Rakjat. In his address, Aidit raised the question of democracy and political freedom. According to the War Authority, this could disrupt political stability in Indonesia.

After the events of the 30 September Movement in 1965, all dailies published in Jakarta were banned, except the military-owned Angkatan Bersendjata and Berita Yudha. On 3 October 1965, Harian Rakjat finally ceased publication. It was not only disbanded: all the PKI members and activists who supported the newspaper were hunted down, arrested, imprisoned, and even killed. The final words from the editor to its readers were, "Many-many thanks, all the readers!"

== Journalism style ==
The style of journalism carried by Harian Rakjat was 'confrontation journalism' with explosive/fiery language. Its editorials were confrontational, leading to conflicts with other media. It always took a bold and offensive stance against its opponents. Its simple, agile, and forthright language style – in accordance with the teachings of Marxism and Leninism – was easily understood by the peasants and workers who were the basis of the PKI support.

Harian Rakjat was seen as the defender of the Sukarno's Political Manifesto (Manipol). While the right-wing or conservative newspapers were not too concerned about the manifesto, Harian Rakjat became the manifesto's propaganda mouthpiece. It remained anti-imperialist, and considered the right-wing newspapers to have insulted Sukarno for not supporting the manifesto. Harian Rakjat took the stance that it would not publish any writing that was contrary to the ideas of the revolution.

== Links ==
Digitized copies of select issues of Harian Rakjat, 1952, 1955, and 1957, at Khastara online archive: https://khastara.perpusnas.go.id/koleksi-digital/detail/?catId=485026
