= Lukman Faily =

Iraqi diplomat (born 1966)

Ambassador Lukman Faily

Iraqi Ambassador to United States of America
- Incumbent
- Assumed office July 2013
- Preceded by: Jabir Habib Jabir

Lukman Faily (born 1966) is the Iraqi Ambassador to the United States. He has served as the Iraqi Ambassador to Japan.

== Education ==
Faily graduated from Manchester Metropolitan University with a Bachelor of Science in Mathematics and Computer Science, and has completed a Master in Business Administration (MBA) in Technology Management and a postgraduate degree in Computing for Commerce and Industry.

== Career ==
Faily lived in the United Kingdom for 20 years, working in the Information Technology sector, and held senior management positions in two major American companies, Ceridan Centrefile and Electronic Data Systems, which is now part of Hewlett Packard.

In addition to his professional career, Faily was an active leader within the Iraqi community in United Kingdom. He served as a trustee for a number of Iraqi non-governmental organizations, and was vocal in opposition to Saddam Hussein's regime.

Faily began his diplomatic career in 2010 as an Ambassador at the Iraqi Ministry of Foreign Affairs. From June 2010 until May 2013, he served as Iraq's Ambassador to Japan. After being appointed as Ambassador to the United States, Faily presented his credentials to US Deputy Secretary of State William J. Burns at a welcome ceremony on 31 May 2013 at the US State Department. His term as Ambassador to the United States officially began following a credentialing ceremony with President Barack Obama on 18 July 2013.

In Washington, Faily has represented the Government of Iraq in speeches and the media during his country's 2014 election, formation of Dr. Haider al-Abadi's new government and the fight against the Islamic State of Iraq and the Levant.

== Personal life ==
He is of Feyli Kurdish origin, and his family were heavily engaged with the movement of Masoud Barzani in the 1970s and 1980s, as well as Muhsin al-Hakim in the 1960s. He is fluent in English, Arabic and Kurdish. He is married and is the father of four boys. Faily is also a marathon runner, who participated in the 2012 and 2013 Tokyo Marathons for tsunami relief, the 2014 Boston Marathon in support of Boston bombing victims and an Iraq-based education non-profit, and the 2014 New York Marathon.
