= Lukman =

Lukman or Lucman may refer to the following people

Given name

- Ingatun-Lukman Gumuntul Istarul, Filipino politician
- Lukman Alade Fakeye (born 1983), Nigerian sculptor and woodcarver
- Lukman Avaran (born 1990), Indian actor
- Lukman Faily (born 1966), Iraqi Ambassador to the United States
- Lukman Haruna (born 1990), Nigerian football midfielder
- Lukman Meriwala (born 1991), Indian cricketer
- Lukman Olaonipekun (born 1975), Nigerian photojournalist
- Lukman Saketi (born 1921), Indonesian sports shooter
- Lukman Sardi (born 1971), Indonesian actor

Surname

- Imoro Lukman (born 1984), Ghanaian football player
- Leon Lukman (born 1931), Serbian pole vaulter
- M. H. Lukman (1920–1965), Indonesian politician
- Mubashir Lucman (born 1963), Pakistani film director, journalist and talk show host
- Okky Lukman (born 1984), Indonesian actress, comedian, and host
- Rashid Lucman (1924–1984), Filipino legislator
- Rilwanu Lukman (1938–2014), Nigerian engineer

== See also ==
- Luckman
