= Njoto =

Indonesian communist politician (1927–1965)

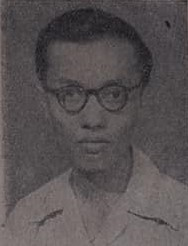

Minister of State
- In office 2 September 1964 – 13 December 1965
- President: Sukarno

Personal details
- Born: 17 January 1927 Jember, Dutch East Indies
- Died: 13 December 1965 (aged 38) Tanjung Priok or Bekasi, Indonesia
- Party: PKI
- Spouse: Soetarni
- Children: 7
- Parents: Raden Sosro Hartono (father); Masalmah (mother)

Lukman Njoto or Njoto (17 January 1927 – 13 December 1965) was a senior national leader of the Communist Party of Indonesia (PKI), who joined the party shortly after the country's declaration of independence, and was killed following the 1965 coup attempt.

== Biography ==
=== Early life ===
Njoto was born on 17 January 1927 in the house of his grandfather, Marjono, in Jember. (Note: Mortimer wrote that Njoto was born in 1925 while the birthplace was East Java, various reports give his birthplace as Besuki, Jember, or Blitar.) Njoto's parents were Raden Sosro Hartono, a descendant of the Surakarta royal family, and Masalmah. He had two younger sisters, Sri Windarti and Iramani. He and Windarti attended the Hollands Inlandsche School (HIS) in Jember and lived with their maternal grandparents in Kampung Tempean, Jember. Their father wanted them to enroll there because Dutch schools were better organized than native schools. After regular school, Njoto had private lessons in the evening with Meneer Darmo.

After graduating from school, Njoto enrolled at the Meer Uitgebreid Lager Onderwijs (MULO) school in Jember. Eventually during the Japanese occupation, the school was disbanded. Njoto's father sent him to another MULO in Solo. In the second grade of MULO, according his classmate Sabar Anantaguna, Njoto said that he had to go home to Jember, but, in fact, he was going to Surabaya, where he was involved in the disarmament of the Japanese imperial army. During this time, Njoto met future PKI leaders D.N. Aidit and M.H. Lukman. Njoto was also involved in the Battle of Surabaya against the British.

=== PKI leader ===
During the Indonesian National Revolution, as a representative of the PKI Banyuwangi branch, Njoto became a member of the Central Indonesian National Committee (KNIP), a body appointed to assist the president of the newly independent Indonesia. At the time, Njoto was living in Hotel Merdeka, Malioboro, Yogyakarta. In March 1947, after KNIP held a meeting in Malang, Aidit was elected as chairman of the PKI fraction, while Njoto was elected as chairman of Badan Pekerja KNIP. In early 1948, Njoto, Aidit, and Lukman were ordered by the party to translate The Communist Manifesto. In August 1948, the PKI Central Committee comprised Aidit in land affairs, Lukman in agitation and propaganda, and Njoto in relation with other organizations. Around this time, mid-1948, Njoto was also a member of the Politbiro. On 17 August 1950, Njoto along with Aidit, M.S. Ashar, and A.S. Dharta founded Institute for the People's Culture (Lekra), a literary and social movement, while according to Tempo Zulkifli and Hidayat, the four founded Lekra in 1951.

On 7 January 1951, Njoto, along with Aidit, Sudisman, Alimin, and Lukman were elected to the Politbiro by the Central Committee. Also in January 1951, Njoto, Pardede, Lukman, and Aidit were appointed to the editorial staff of Bintang Merah (Red Star), a paper that was first published on 15 August 1950. In July 1951, the PKI appointed Njoto to supervise the content of the PKI newspaper Harian Rakjat (People's Daily). In August 1951, the government conducted searches and arrested PKI leaders because of fears of a repeat of the 1948 Madiun affair. However, Njoto, Lukman, and Aidit managed to evade arrest and hid, not appearing in public for several months. After the meeting of Central Committee in October 1953, the three became leaders of the party: Aidit as the secretary general, with Lukman and Njoto as Aidit's first and second deputies respectively. Njoto was made responsible for agitation and propaganda. In 1953, Njoto took over the leadership of Harian Rakjat, replacing the founder Siauw Giok Tjhan. In Harian Rakjat he wrote under the pen name Iramani, and used a softer and more poetic than his sharper writing in Bintang Merah. Njoto was also appointed to the Provisional People's Representative Council in 1954, replacing Aidit’s resigning father Abdullah Aidit.

On 1 August 1956, Njoto spoke to Central Committee members, telling them that the party had to educate its cadres about its ideology since the increase in party membership was significant. In October 1958, Njoto claimed that the most important thing was the unity between the bourgeois and proletariate, but Oloan Hutapea in an article in August 1959 rejected the view that this alliance was important to the party. After heavy PKI criticism of government performance in July 1960, Njoto and Aidit were questioned by Colonel Achmad Sukendro from Army intelligence. In August 1960, along with Aidit, Njoto was appointed as PKI representative in National Front.

In March 1962, Njoto and Aidit were appointed ministers without specific responsibilities, only coordinating or advisory roles. According to a PKI report published on 14 April 1964, Njoto was at a large meeting of farmers in Klaten. He stated that the land reform law could only be reached by people's actions and a patriotic and democratic government. After Sukarno was appointed as the president for life by the Provisional People's Consultative Assembly (MPRS), in September 1964, Njoto was appointed as state minister in the Dwikora Cabinet responsible for supervision of land reform.

Between 1963 and 1964, Njoto travelled to the Soviet Union several times to establish links between PKI and the Communist Party of the Soviet Union. He was accompanied by Rita, an Indonesian literature student in Moscow. According to Soetarni, Njoto's wife, Rita was the translator between Indonesian and Russian. At the end of 1964, Soetarni was depressed about the rumour that Njoto would marry Rita. Soetarni was pregnant with her the sixth child when the rumour started. She said she would divorce Njoto if the rumour proved to be true. According to Joesoef Isak, Njoto had fallen in love with Rita. Isak claimed that Soetarni was more beautiful, but Njoto claimed that Rita was more intellectual. According to a source from Tempo, Rita was a KGB agent. The source claimed that anyone visiting the Soviet Union would be accompanied by a KGB agent. After the affair between Njoto and Rita became known to the party, Njoto was dismissed from all functional positions in the party. However, Njoto still attended party meetings except those held by Politbiro.

In April 1964, Njoto used the term "Sukarnoisme" in a speech in Palembang. The PKI, especially Aidit, considered that Njoto betrayed communism by using this term. Njoto was later replaced as Chairman of Agitation and Propaganda by Oloan Hutapea, though the real reason was the affair between Njoto and Rita.

According to a Tempo magazine source, after the removal, Sukarno wanted Njoto to form a new party called the Indonesian People's Party (Partai Rakyat Indonesia) with Sukarnoism as the principle, but the idea was never realised.

Early June 1965, Njoto and Subandrio discussed the implementation of the Sino-Indonesian Agreement with Zhou Enlai in Guangzhou. Njoto wrote the speech given by Sukarno on the Celebration of Independence Day 17 August 1965, which was about corruption and counter-revolutionaries.

=== 30 September Movement and aftermath ===
About one week before 17 August 1965, Njoto was in Amsterdam negotiating a contract with Fokker between the two countries. He then went to Moscow along with Aidit to attend the Communist Party Summit Conference. After being informed by Foreign Minister Subandrio on 31 July that Sukarno was looking for him, Njoto returned to Indonesia on 9 August. Aidit talked to Chinese doctors and Njoto about the health of the President on 8 and 10 August respectively. He claimed Sukarno would die or would be out of action soon.

On 28 September 1965, Njoto traveled to Sumatra with Subandrio. When the 30 September Movement began, they were still in Medan to set up a local Revolutionary Council chapter. On 2 October 1965, Njoto, after returning from Medan, left his home in Menteng along with Soetarni and his children. He hid his family at the house of a colleague in Kebayoran. M.H. Lukman claimed that on the night of 5 October several PKI leaders including Njoto and Lukman himself, but excluding Aidit, held a meeting at Isak's house to coordinate before the special cabinet meeting in Bogor. Harian Rakjat reporter Amarzan Ismail Hamid stated that on the morning of 6 October Njoto and Lukman discussed the meeting beforehand: if the meeting went badly, both of them would go to Bandung, but if the meeting went well, they would stay in Jakarta. According to Tempo, on the cabinet special meeting held on 6 October 1965 in Istana Bogor, Njoto was asked by Sukarno about the 30 September Movement. Njoto denied the party was involved, saying, "the PKI was not responsible for the event." It was an internal problem in the Army." (Note: Original: "PKI tidak bertanggung jawab atas peristiwa G30S. Kejadian itu adalah masalah internal Angkatan Darat.")

Njoto was interviewed by Asahi Shimbun in Jakarta on 2 December 1965 and stated that he did not know about the killing of six generals. According to John Roosa, a historian of University of British Columbia, in Pretext for Mass Murder, Njoto had not been invited by Aidit to Politbiro meetings. According to Iskandar Subekti, quoted by Roosa, Aidit considered that Njoto was more a Sukarnoist than a communist. Meanwhile, other notes stated that Njoto was closer to the Soviet Union than to China, which was Aidit's patron.

According to Sarbi Moehadi, former chairman of Lekra Pekalongan, several months after the movement, Njoto led a meeting in Slawi, but Amarzan rejected the claim because Jakarta was safer than other places and Njoto never moved out of Jakarta.

There are several version of Njoto's arrest. According to Amarzan, Njoto was arrested in Tosari, Menteng. According to Irina Dayasih, Njoto was arrested on the way from Ministry of State office around December 1965. According to Iramani, Njoto was shot dead in either Tanjung Priok, or Bekasi on 13 December 1965 after being held in the Budi Utomo Military Detention Centre. According to historian Bonnie Triana, Njoto was killed in Jakarta and the corpse was thrown into the Ciliwung River.

=== Politics and ideology ===
During his time in MULO, Njoto read communist books by Karl Marx, Stalin, and Lenin. According to Joesoef Isak, Njoto was the only PKI leader who was "liberal", pragmatical, and not dogmatic. Because of this, Sukarno liked him, even called him the more affection dik instead the more formal Bung. Sukarno also had called Njoto a "true Marhaenist". (Note: Original: "Marhaenis sejati".) Njoto invented the term "Sukarnoism", according to Tempo, because most of the farmers in Indonesia didn't know the term Marxism.

Iwan Simatupang stated that Njoto was "an intellectual and philosophical snob." (Note: Original: "... sok intelek dan sok filosofis.") Simatupang stated that Njoto had more influence than Lukman and Aidit. Some artists, he claimed, such as Rivai Apin, Basuki Resobowo, and Henk Ngantunk were close to communism because of Njoto.

=== Personal life ===
Njoto's father taught his son to play the violin, and he could also play the saxophone. According to Windarti, Njoto also could play guitar and drums and composed several songs. He enjoyed classical music and jazz. During the Japanese occupation, Njoto, Windarti, and three other girls formed a band, Suara Putri, with four women as vocalists and Njoto as guitarist. They performed Wanita Asia, a song that praised the Japanese who had come and immediately expelled the Dutch. After the independence, the song was banned. One of his friends in music was Jack Lesmana.

In literature, Njoto read works by Russians such as Nikolai Gogol and Dostoevsky. For Indonesians, Njoto liked H.B. Jassin's works. He also praised Hamka's works. Njoto wrote several poems published in Harian Rakjat, titled "Tahun Baru", "Catatan Peking", Jangtoe", "Shanghai", Merah Kesumba", "Variasi Haiku", "Variasi Cak", and "Pertemuan di Paris". These poems were published in September 2008 titled Gugur Merah: Sehimpunan Puisi Lekra, Harian Rakyat: 1950-1965. According to Asahan, in literature, Njoto was more democratic, more aesthetic, and more universal. In the accusing of Tenggelamnya Kapal van der Wijk by Hamka, Njoto advised Lekra not to "destroy" him. Njoto also wrote "Merah Kesumba" as a reaction of solidarity to Congo after the death of Patrice Lumumba.

Njoto married Soetarni in May 1955. The couple had seven children. The sixth child, named Fidelia Dayatun, was born before the 30 September Movement. The seventh, called Butet was born when Soetarni was in hiding. The seventh was adopted by Soetarni's younger sister. The other children were Ilham Dayawan, Svetlana Dayani, Timur, Irina Dayasih, and Risalina Dayana. All of Njoto's children have the word daya in their names, taken from Njoto's alias Kusumo Digdoyo. Digdoyo means daya in Indonesian, or "power" in English.
