= Sudisman =

Indonesian communist politician

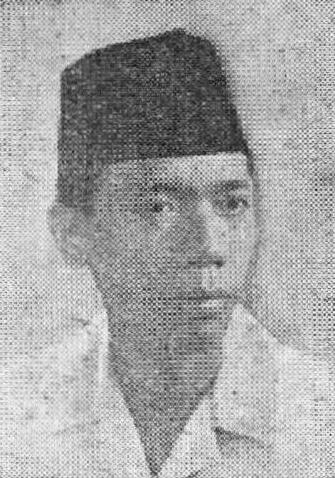
- Official portrait, 1956

Chief of the Emergency Politburo Command of the Communist Party of Indonesia
- In office 22 November 1965 – 1 December 1966
- Preceded by: D. N. Aidit
- Succeeded by: Oloan Hutapea

Member of the House of Representatives
- In office 25 June 1960 – 15 November 1965
- In office 4 March 1956 – 5 July 1959
- Constituency: East Java

Personal details
- Born: 27 July 1920 Surabaya, Dutch East Indies (present-day Indonesia)
- Died: October 1968 (aged 48) Indonesia
- Party: Gerindo (c. 1940s); INP (1945–1947); PKI (1947–1966)

We live in order to struggle, and we struggle in order to live. We live not just for the sake of life alone; we live to defend that life with courage till our hearts cease to beat. From the moment that a human being is born, from his first whimper as a baby to his last breath, life is a struggle. Sometimes he will face a struggle that is very difficult, sometimes he will face a hard-fought battle. Not every such contest is crowned with victory. But the aim of life is to have the courage to enter this hard-fought battle and at the same time win the victory. This is the dream of everyone who struggles, not excluding the communists. This too is my dream of life. For without dreams, without ideals, life is barren and empty.

— Sudisman

Sudisman (EVO: Soedisman; 27 July 1920 – October 1968) was a leader of the Communist Party of Indonesia (PKI) and the only PKI leader to be put on trial following the 30 September Movement in 1965. He was sentenced to death and executed.

He was the fourth highest-ranking member of the Communist Party of Indonesia's Politburo, and was the only one of the five senior leaders of PKI to be tried. All but one of the ten PKI politburo members were killed.

Sudisman tried to reorganize the PKI into an underground movement after other senior leaders were captured and summarily executed. He acted as the leader of the PKI for a short time before his arrest. He was finally arrested in December 1966.

== Trial ==
Sudisman on his way to a military tribunal

Sudisman was the highest ranking PKI politburo member to appear before the Mahmillub (Mahkamah Militer Luar Biasa, the Extraordinary Military Tribunal), as the other members had been killed. Sudisman's trial was held in July 1967.

Testimonies of Sudisman and other PKI leaders greatly strengthened the case against them in the trial. They more or less admitted their own involvement in a coup attempt. However, they claimed that the 30 September Movement was justified as there had really been a so-called "Council of Generals" that had plotted against Sukarno to take power after his death, or to depose him. They denied accusations and interpretations that the PKI had been the sole organizer of the coup attempt. Army's and prosecution's version of the events are highly unlikely, and the first initiative for the coup attempt may have come from dissatisfied army officers, despite the PKI leadership's involvement.

Sudisman's testimonies gave a plausible explanation that PKI as an organization had not been involved with the coup attempt, and Dipa Nusantara Aidit had been the person who had acted on his own initiative and plotted with the officers. Suharto managed to use Aidit's actions as a justification for the mass killings of 1965–66. The resulting elimination of the PKI from Indonesian politics achieved goals of right-wing officers and Muslim extremists who were backed by the United States.

Sudisman was executed in October 1968.

== See also ==
- Nasakom
- Transition to the New Order
