= D. N. Aidit =

Indonesian communist politician (1923–1965)

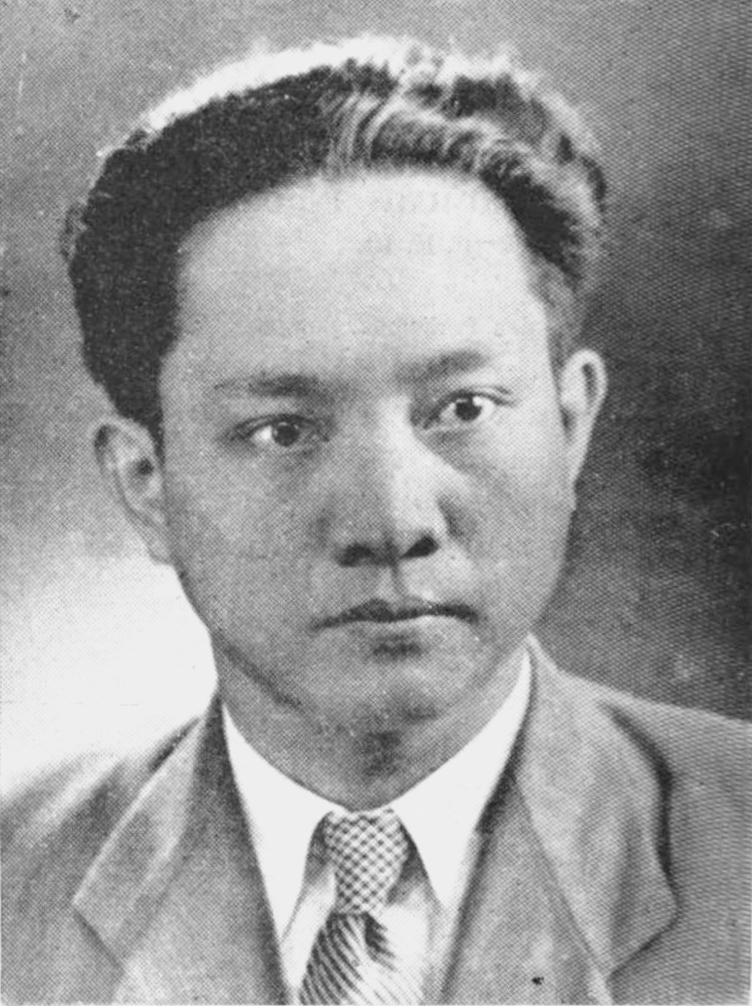
- Portrait, c. 1950s

Deputy Speaker of the People's Consultative Assembly
- In office 15 September 1960 – 1 October 1965 Serving with Idham Chalid, Ali Sastroamidjojo and Wilujo Puspojudo
- President: Sukarno
- Preceded by: Office established
- Succeeded by: See list: Osa Maliki; Mashudi; Mohammad Subchan; Melanchton Siregar

Member of the House of Representatives
- In office 4 March 1956 – 5 July 1959
- Constituency: Central Java

Secretary-General of the Communist Party of Indonesia
- In office 7January 1951 – 22 November 1965
- Deputy: M. H. Lukman; Njoto
- Preceded by: Alimin
- Succeeded by: Sudisman

Personal details
- Born: Ahmad Aidit; 30 July 1923 Tanjungpandan, Belitung, Dutch East Indies
- Died: 22 November 1965 (aged 42) Boyolali, Indonesia
- Cause of death: Summary execution
- Party: Communist
- Spouse: Soetanti (m. 1948)
- Children: 5
- Parent(s): Abdullah Aidit; Mailan
- Education: Middestand Handel School

Dipa Nusantara Aidit (born Achmad Aidit; 30 July 1923 – 22 November 1965) was an Indonesian communist politician, who served as General Secretary of the Communist Party of Indonesia (PKI) from 1951 until his summary execution during the mass killings of 1965–66. Born on Belitung Island, he was nicknamed "Amat".

== Early life ==
Aidit was born Achmad Aidit in Tanjung Pandan, Belitung, 30 July 1923. He was the first son of four. His parents were Abdullah Aidit and Mailan. Achmad and his siblings studied at Hollandsche Inlandsch School.

In early 1936, Achmad asked his father to continue his studies in Jakarta (then called Batavia). Achmad then attended Middestand Handel School, instead of Meer Uitgebreid Lager Onderwijs, because the registration had already been closed. For three years he lived in Cempaka Putih with his father's colleague. He moved to Senen and lived with his brother Murad who followed in Achmad's footsteps. Unwilling to rely on money sent by their parents, Achmad and Murad tried to earn money themselves. In those times, Achmad was an active as member of Persatuan Timur Muda, under Gerindo (Indonesian People's Movement), led by Amir Sjarifudin and Adnan Kapau Gani, and later became the chairman. Achmad also changed his name to Dipa Nusantara, which was shortened as D.N. and was often mistaken for Djafar Nawawi, to conceal his descent which was at first, rejected by his father.

== Political career ==
During the Japanese occupation, in Asrama Menteng 31 D.N. Aidit and his friends received political lectures from Sukarno, Hatta, Amir Sjarifudin, Achmad Subardjo, and Ki Hajar Dewantoro. There, in 1943, Aidit first met M.H. Lukman. They were members of Gerakan Indonesia Merdeka while Aidit as the chairman of political council of the organization and Lukman as his member. In 1944, they were elected as the member of Barisan Pelopor Indonesia, the 100 men who were most loyal to Sukarno. About one year before Indonesian independence, Aidit, M.H. Lukman, Sidik Kertapati, Chalid Rasjidi, and the other young men studied politics at Asrama Kemerdekaan founded by Rear Admiral Maeda and headed by Wikana.

In early September 1945, Angkatan Pemuda Indonesia was formed. Aidit was appointed as the chairman of API section Jakarta Raya. On 5 November, Aidit, Alizar Thaib, and the other API member attacked Koninklijk Nederlands Indisch Leger's post but eventually were arrested. They were then exiled to Onrust island. After seven months, Aidit and Lukman were released.

=== The Rise of the Communist Party ===
After released, Aidit and Lukman went to Yogyakarta to meet Wikana. In Yogyakarta, Aidit and Lukman ran the bimonthly magazine, Bintang Merah. There, they met Njoto, PKI's Banyuwangi representative.

In March 1947, Aidit was appointed as chairman of a PKI faction in a KNIP meeting. In early 1948, Aidit, Lukman, and Njoto were assigned to translate The Communist Manifesto into Indonesian. In August, the three became members of the Central Committee, respectively responsible for land affair, agitation and propaganda, and relation to other organizations. The three and Sudisman became members of the new PKI Politburo formed by Musso on 1 September 1948. Aidit was responsible for the labor section of the party. Aidit and Lukman managed to escape to China and Vietnam after PKI position was pressed in Madiun Affair, while Murad claimed that Aidit took shelter in Tanjung Priok. While in hiding, Aidit and Lukman reran Bintang Merah on 15 August 1950. They also published Suara Rakjat two weekly. In January 1951, Njoto joined the latter.

After the 1948 affair, the four young members of the Politburo, Aidit, Njoto, Lukman, and Sudisman replaced the old leaders in January 1951 as a result of the fifth congress of the party. Aidit was appointed as the secretary general of the party, which was later renamed as chairman, while Njoto and Lukman as his deputies. The PKI led by Aidit was not only based on laborers and plantation workers, but also farmers and peasants. During the August 1951 mass arrests of communists, Aidit went into hiding with Njoto and Lukman, while thousands of the party's members and leaders were detained without charge.

=== Secretary General of the PKI ===
Though a Marxist, Aidit submitted to Sukarno's Marhaenism policy and allowed the party to grow without any overt intentions towards power. In return for his support of Sukarno, he rose to the position of Secretary-General of the PKI.

Under his leadership, the PKI began to change its strategy from a party that had rebelled in 1948 to one that was at the forefront of implementing real programs to help the people. The PKI was involved in education programs, especially those based on community groups, such as Pemuda Rakyat, Gerwani, Barisan Tani Indonesia (BTI), Lekra, and others. The PKI's education programs were actually far more successful in educating illiterate workers and farmers than underfunded state schools or private Islamic boarding schools. The PKI was more than just a political party with an economic agenda: it represented a social and cultural revolution.

During the 1955 general election campaign, Aidit and the PKI drew a large following. In the next decade, the PKI became a leftist rival to conservative elements among the Muslim political parties and the Army. By 1965, the PKI had become the largest political party in Indonesia, and the third largest communist party in the world after the Soviet Union and China.

In 1958, he held a film convention festival under PKI name to support Indonesian film stars and was attended by several artist, such as Nun Zairina, Gordon Tobing, and Bing Slamet, to contribute their talent during the festival. Minister of Education Prijono also attended the event and gave a speech which invited to pay more attention to the Indonesian film industry as an important aspect in building morals in society.

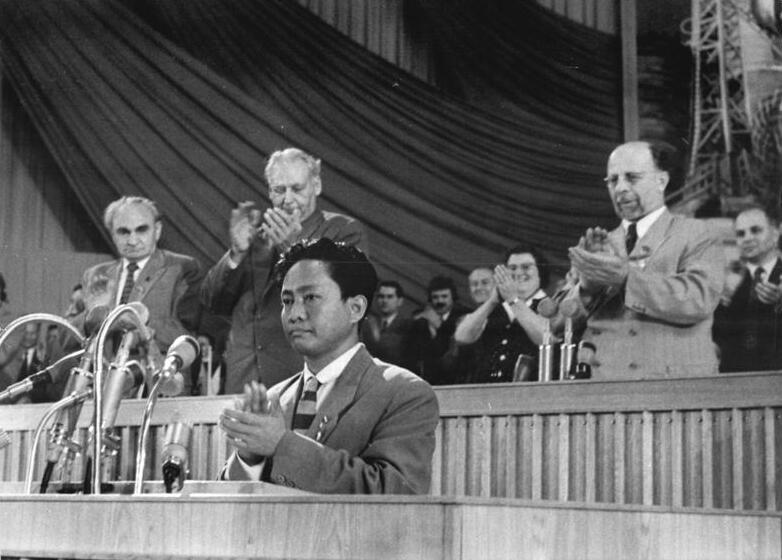
D. N. Aidit giving a speech at the 5th Congress of the Socialist Unity Party of Germany (Sozialistische Einheitspartei Deutschlands) in Berlin (1958). Wilhelm Pieck standing to the left, Walter Ulbricht standing to the right.

=== Failed coup and death ===
An attempted coup occurred on 30 September 1965, which was later officially blamed on the PKI (see Transition to the New Order). On 2 October, Aidit went to Yogyakarta to meet the regional PKI chairman Sutrisno. After a few hours, Aidit moved to Semarang also to consolidate to the party officials in the region. The meeting concluded that the coup was the Army's internal problem and PKI knew nothing about it. In the afternoon of that day, Aidit went to Boyolali to meet Boyolali regent Suwali who was a PKI member. Aidit then went to Solo to meet the mayor Utomo Ramelan who was also a member. The meeting contradicted the conclusion of the meeting in Semarang. Several Politbiro members including Aidit and M. H. Lukman met in Blitar on 5 October. There Aidit wrote a letter of the PKI view of the coup which was read by Njoto during a cabinet meeting in Bogor.

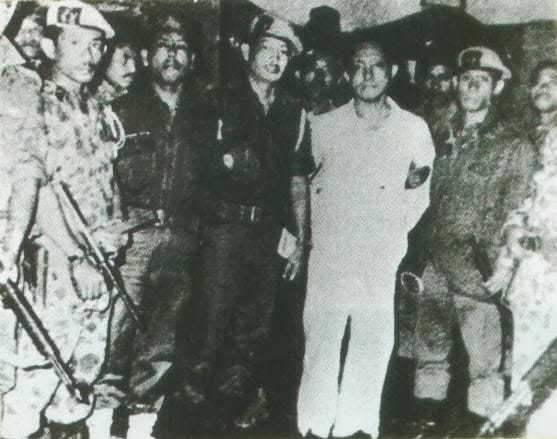
Aidit (in white attire) captured by Soeharto-loyal forces, with Col. Yasir Hadibroto standing to his left.

Aidit then fled to Boyolali, where he was captured by forces loyal to General Suharto. According to Zulkifli and Hidayat, on 22 November Aidit was arrested by a search party led by Colonel Yasir Hadibroto in a house in Sambeng Village, Solo. In the early morning, he was brought to Boyolali and was summarily executed as part of the bloody 1965/66 anti-communist purge. The military claimed Aidit had confessed to plotting the coup. Officials at the U.S embassy doubted this, as his alleged statement referenced a document they knew was disseminated as part of anti-communist propaganda operation. The body of Aidit is believed to be at the bottom of an old well. Another version of the story suggests that Aidit was blown up along with the house where he was being held.

== Political views ==
According to Ricklefs, Aidit thought that "Marxism was a guide to action, not an inflexible dogma". Aidit sympathized with Musso's Jalan Baru untuk Republik Indonesia (A New Road for Indonesian Republic), though he stated that the Madiun Affair was just "children's games".

== Personal life ==
Aidit married Soetanti in early 1948. Aidit's second son, Ilham, was born on 18 May 1959 in Moscow.

== Bibliography ==
- Cribb, Robert (1985). "The Indonesian Marxist Tradition". In Mackerras, Colin; Knight, Nick (eds.). Marxism in Asia. Croom Helm. ISBN 9780709917458.
- Melvin, Jess (2018) The Army and the Indonesian Genocide: Mechanics of Mass Murder Routledge, UK ISBN 9781138574694
- Ricklefs, M.C. (2001). A History of Modern Indonesia Since c. 1200 (3rd ed.). Palgrave Macmillan. ISBN 9781403990242.
- Robinson, Geoffrey B. (2018) The Killing Season: A History of the Indonesian Massacres, 1965-66 Princeton University Press ISBN 0691161380
- Roosa, John (2006). Pretext for Mass Murder: The September 30th Movement and Suharto's Coup d'État in Indonesia. Madison, Wisconsin: The University of Wisconsin Press. ISBN 978-0-299-22034-1.
- Zulkifli, Arif; Hidayat, Bagja, eds. (2010). Aidit, Dua Wajah Dipa Nusantara. Seri Buku Tempo. Jakarta: Kepustakaan Populer Gramedia. ISBN 9789799109187.
