= Djamaluddin Tamin =

Indonesian politician (1900–1977)

Djamaluddin Tamim
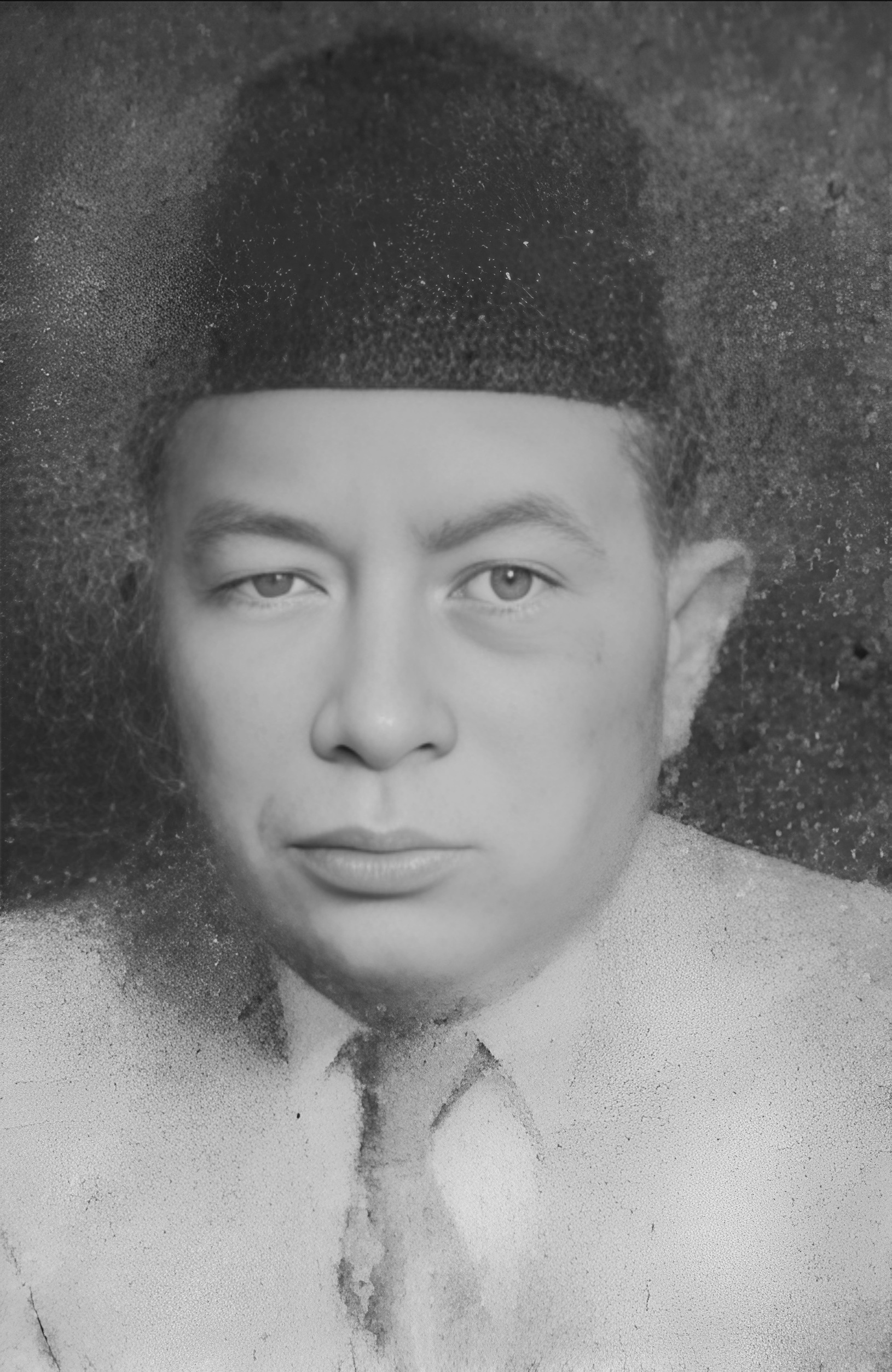
- Born: November 18, 1900; Koto Gadang, Agam, Dutch East Indies
- Died: April 1, 1977 (aged 76); Jakarta, Indonesia
- Occupation: Politician
- Known for: Indonesian independence activist
- Political party: Indonesian Republic Party; Murba Party
- Spouse: Tudjza Halim
- Children: Yuliasmi Tamimi, Martini Tamimi, Nadir Tamimi, Lunik Tamimi, Yurri Tamimi, Irianta Tamimi, Titi Tamimi, Tinara Tamimi

Djamaluddin Tamim (18 November 1900 – 1 April 1977) was an Indonesian journalist and independence activist.

== Early life ==
Djamaluddin Tamim was educated at the Hollandsch-Inlandsche School (HIS) and Sumatra Thawalib in Padang Panjang. After graduating, he briefly taught at his alma mater, Sumatra Thawalib.

== Revolutionary activity ==
In 1923, together with Ahmad Khatib Datuk Batuah, he founded the Padang Panjang Section of Sarekat Islam (SI), which leaned toward SI-Merah, and was appointed its secretary and treasurer. In December 1923, he wrote in the newspaper Pemandangan Islam about the arrests of Indonesian independence activists. Six months later, he was convicted for the article and imprisoned at Cipinang Prison for fifteen months. In August 1924, he was transferred to a prison in Padang. He was released in September 1925.

Following the communist uprising in Silungkang in 1927, he fled to Singapore. There, he became a follower of Tan Malaka. During his exile, Djamaluddin Tamim was assisted by Syekh Abdul Wahab, who provided him with employment and accommodation. He also established contact with Tahir Jalaluddin in Perak. When the Dutch arrested Tahir during his 1927 visit to Sumatra and threatened to exile him to Digul, Tamim, using the pseudonym Tunarman, wrote a series of articles in Bintang Timur demanding his release.

In May 1927, Djamaluddin Tamim travelled to Bangkok, Thailand. On 2 June 1927, together with Tan Malaka and Subakat, he founded the Indonesian Republic Party (PARI). The party aimed to establish a network of proletarians across Southeast Asia and Australia. Tamim was responsible for PARI’s activities in the Dutch East Indies, Malaya, and Singapore. He recruited and trained a number of cadres through "advanced-level" courses. His prominent followers included Djamaluddin Ibrahim and Kandur Sutan Rangkayo Basa. He also sent several people to Tan Malaka’s hideout in Bangkok to receive political education.

== Capture to Digul ==
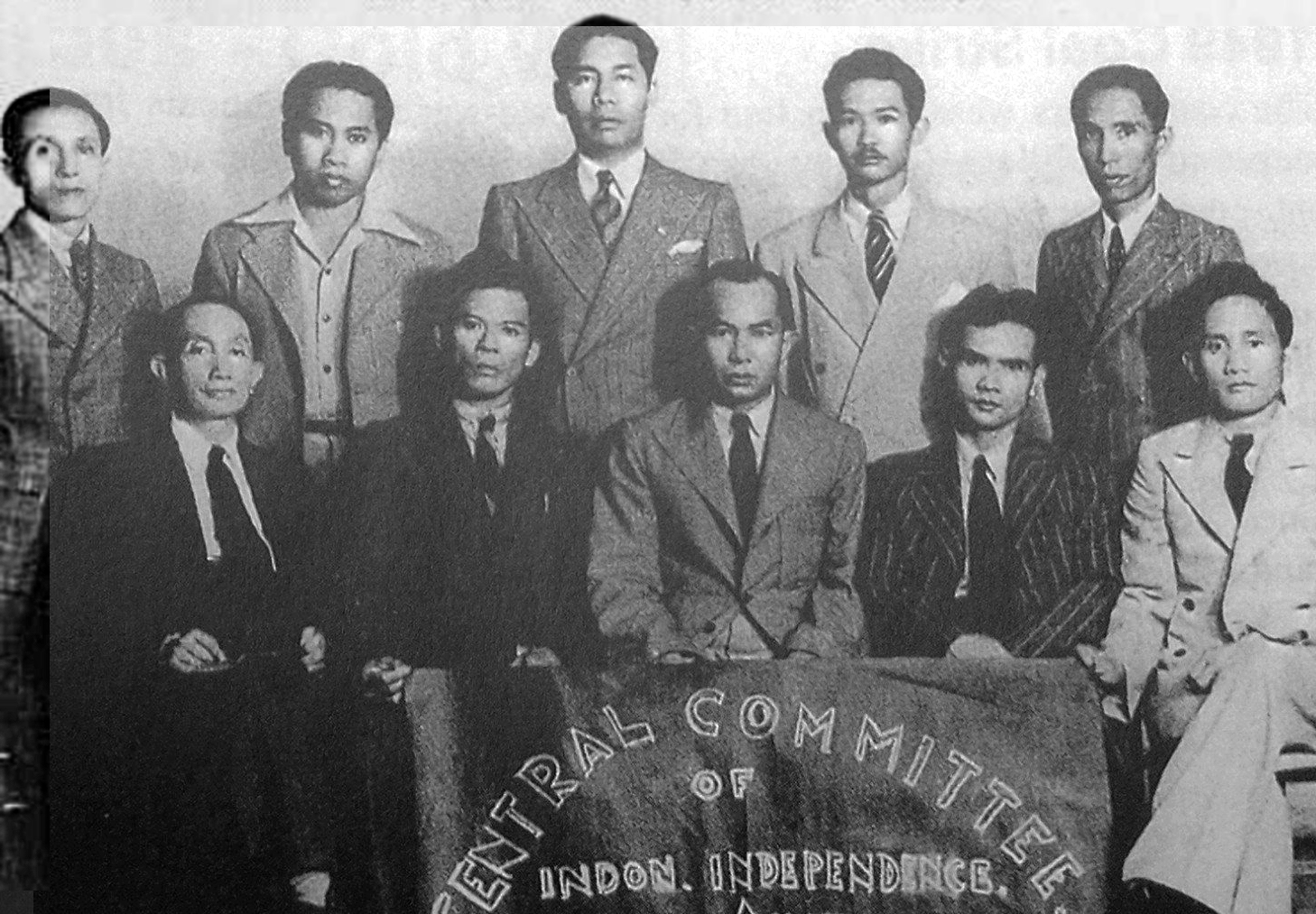
Australian delegation representing Cenkim at the First Congress of SOBSI, consisting of trade unionists, former Boven Digul detainees, and representatives of the Communist Party of Australia, the Communist Party of Indonesia, the Indonesian Republic Party, and the Indonesian National Party. Front row: first from left, Sardjono (PKI); third, Tamim (PKI); fourth, Bondan (PNI). 16–18 May 1947.

Because he was considered to have opposed the British government, he was arrested in Singapore on 13 September 1932 and subsequently taken to Batavia, where he was handed over to the government of the Dutch East Indies. He was imprisoned there for several months before being exiled to Boven Digul.

After Japanese forces landed in Indonesia, Tamim and the other Boven Digul detainees were transferred to Brisbane, Australia. There, on 21 September 1945, they formed the Central Committee for Indonesian Independence (Cenkim), with Tamim as its chairman. Djamaluddin Tamim was repatriated to Indonesia in 1946.

In 1957, while in poor health, he wrote a commemorative book marking the eighth anniversary of Tan Malaka's death.
