= Government of the National Front of Madiun =

Revolutionary government in Indonesia

Soviet Republic of Indonesia Soviet Republik Indonesia (Indonesian) Sovjetrepubliek Indonesië (Dutch)
- 1948
- Flag
- Anthem: "Indonesia Raya"
- Map of Madiun revolt campaigns
- Status: Revolutionary government
- Capital: Madiun
- Common languages: Indonesian
- Administrative Region (Regional National Government): Madiun
- Government: Unitary communist state under a provisional government
- Head of Government
  - 1948: Soepardi
- Military Government
  - 1948: Soemarsono
- Chairman of the National Front Committee
  - 1948: Harjono
- Legislature: Committee of the National Front
  - Upper house: Committee of the National Front
- Historical era: 1948 Madiun rebellion
  - Established: 18 September 1948
  - Disestablished: 1 October
- Currency: Rupiah (IDR)
Preceded by	Succeeded by
Indonesia	Indonesia
- Today part of: Indonesia

The Government of the National Front of Madiun (Indonesian: Front Pemerintah Nasional Daerah Madiun; Dutch: Madiun Nationale Frontregering) was a short-lived revolutionary government established in Madiun by the People's Democratic Front group on 18 September 1948 after the capture of Madiun city. Soepardi was appointed by FDR officers Wikana and Setyadjit Soegondo as head of the revolutionary government in the National Front Committee. This government ended when the military units of the Siliwangi Division on 1 October 1948 recaptured the Madiun region.

It was intended to replace the Republic of Indonesia to become the nominal and representative government of Indonesia under the official name Soviet Republic of Indonesia (Indonesian: Soviet Republik Indonesia), inheriting all properties, rights, obligations and sovereignty representation of the Republic of Indonesia during the peak of the Madiun Affair. However due to the small scale of the rebellion, it is commonly known as the Madiun Soviet State (Indonesia: Negara Soviet Madiun).

== History ==
In January 1948, Amir Sjarifoeddin's cabinet signed the Renville Agreement, followed by his resignation some time later as prime minister. This led to various reactions by the public and the media. Some groups agreed with the agreement, while others did not. The formation of the People's Democratic Front was also an effect of the signing of this agreement. The groups that had been part of Sajap Kiri now mostly joined this front. The most important members of this front were the Indonesian Communist Party, the Indonesian Labour Party, the Central All-Indonesian Workers Organization, and the Pesindo army.

In August 1948, the tension escalated, from the textile workers' strike in Delanggu, Klaten, to the armed conflict between Soeadi's Senopati Division and AH Nasution's Siliwangi Division. This armed conflict began with the assassination of the commander of Division IV ‘Senopati’ named Soetarto, before his position was replaced by Soeadi. Eventually, mutual accusations and light armed conflict occurred around the Solo-Yogyakarta area, culminating on 10–13 September 1948, when there was an all-out battle between the two divisions.

General Soedirman finally responded to this event, and together with Colonel Gatot Soebroto, came to see President Sukarno, to ask for help. Sukarno finally appointed Gatot Soebroto as Military Governor of the Solo-Semarang region, and a military administrative area was formed called the Solo-Surakarta Special Military Region.

Elsewhere, Wikana and Setiadjit were ordered by the FDR leadership to inspect the Madiun region, which at that time was the strongest base of the FDR, and also had the title ‘the third city of the republic’, after Yogyakarta and Surakarta. On 18 September 1948, Pesindo units and other pro-FDR forces disarmed the government and took control of vital installations, one of which was a radio station. Through the radio station, it was reported about the new government that controlled Madiun, namely the Madiun Regional National Government Front. On 21 September 1948, Wonogiri was captured by pro-FDR forces, and the Wonogiri Regional National Government was formed.

The National Programme was implemented by the new government in the form of confiscation of company assets, and so on. Soepardi was appointed by Wikana and Setiadjit as head of government in Madiun, Harjono as head of the National Front Committee, which functioned as a parliament, and Soemarsono as Military Governor tasked with coordinating civil and military affairs. Foreign media reactions to the takeover were varied, ranging from the general media in Indonesia to the Netherlands.

== Collapse ==
On 30 September 1948, the Siliwangi Division led by AH Nasution, and the Barisan Banteng attacked Madiun to capture the city. In just one day, after an all-out battle, Madiun was finally recaptured. On 1 October 1948, Madiun returned to Republican hands. Laskar Pesindo, and pro-FDR units fled inland. However, further fighting still took place outside the Madiun area.

== Disputed existence ==
A declassified CIA report from 1999 refutes claims that the 1948 Madiun incident was intended to establish a Soviet-aligned regime. Instead, the report describes the event as a conflict between two official armed forces, resulting in the temporary appointment of a regional head of government in Madiun on September 18, 1948. This leader, who recognized the Central Government in Yogyakarta, was appointed with the approval of both military and civilian authorities in the region. The report notes that armed resistance emerged among local residents and soldiers due to growing anti-imperialist sentiment following President Sukarno's September 19, 1948, speech. Sukarno's call for general mobilization, property seizures, and extrajudicial killings fueled this sentiment. Local resistance efforts were organized by channeling public anger into the formation of a “Pemerintah Front Nasional” (National Front Government) in Madiun. This approach was subsequently adopted in other parts of East Java and Central Java. The CIA document ultimately concludes that allegations labeling the Indonesian Communist Party (PKI) as rebels during the Madiun incident lack evidence and are unfounded.
