= Asmu =

Indonesian communist politician

Asmu Tjiptodarsono
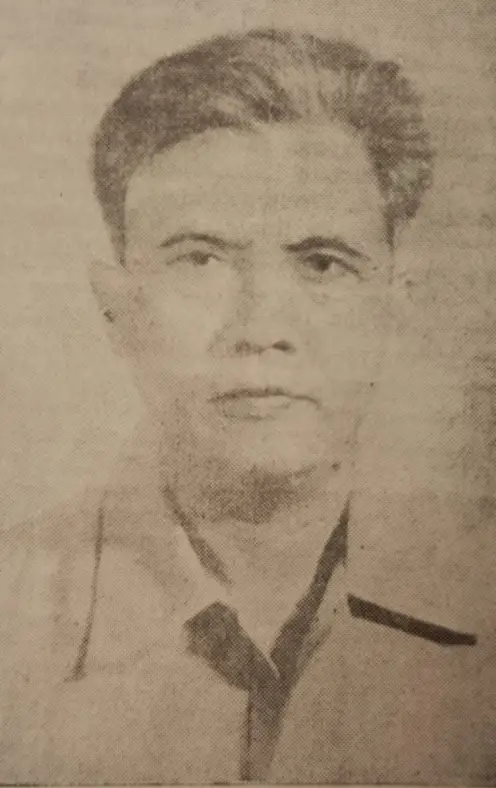

General Chairman of Peasants Front of Indonesia
- In office 12 September 1957 – 12 March 1966
- Preceded by: Djadi Wirosubroto
- Succeeded by: Position Abolished

Personal details
- Died: November 1965 / March 1966 Indonesia
- Party: PBI (1945–1948); PKI (1948–1965)
- Other political affiliations: Peasants Front of Indonesia

Asmu, whose birth name was Asmoe Tjiptodarsono, was a leader, theoretician, and chief agricultural expert of the Indonesian Communist Party (PKI) and head of the Communist-affiliated Peasants Front of Indonesia (Indonesian: Barisan Tani Indonesia) in the mid-1960s. He was killed during the Indonesian mass killings of 1965–66.

== Biography ==
Asmu's background and early life are poorly documented.

In the late 1940s and early 1950s, along with Sakirman, Asmu led the Labour Party of Indonesia (Indonesian: Partai Boeroeh Indonesia). At around the same time, following the Madiun Affair, there was a new generation of younger leaders who rose up the ranks of the Communist Party, led by D. N. Aidit, and Asmu became a member of that new leading faction. Asmu was also briefly involved in the People's Democratic Front (Indonesian: Front Demokrasi Rakjat), a short-lived leftist coalition, as representative of Laskar Boeroeh Indonesia. In 1952 Asmu and Subekti were the PKI delegates to the 19th Congress of the Communist Party of the Soviet Union.

At the turn of the 1960s, as the PKI's agricultural expert, he was concerned that land ownership was being increasingly concentrated in fewer and fewer hands, and advocated nationalizing foreign landholdings and abolishing the land privileges given to village heads. In his published studies, he attempted to prove that, in many villages, under ten percent of "Feudal" families owned more than half the land. He made an effort to communicate his findings to the public and to PKI members; he ran a question and answer column in the party newspaper Harian Rakjat starting in 1961, some of which was later published as one of his better known books, Masalah-masalah Landreform (Problems of Land Reform). (He continued the column until 1965.) In July 1962, he was elected to be general chairman of the Peasants Front of Indonesia (Indonesian: Barisan Tani Indonesia). Through that organization, he constantly pushed for land reform, the arming of peasant groups, and raising the level of education and income of peasants. By 1964, Asmu and other PKI leaders worried that wealthier members of local PKI leadership were blocking progress on radical land redistribution plans.

By 1965, he was a member of the Politburo of the PKI. In January 1965 he was a member of a Supreme Advisory Council session called by Sukarno and chaired by Albert Mangaratua Tambunan which aimed to examine nonviolent land reform in Indonesia. The meeting hoped that a negotiated settlement could find a gradual way towards land reform and to bypass the violence and unilateral actions of the PKI in the countryside.

Asmu's disappearance and death in the anti-communist Indonesian mass killings of 1965–66 following the September 30 Movement is poorly documented. Some newspapers later reported that he had been killed by the military in March 1966. Other sources claim he was killed in an extrajudicial killing in November 1965 and that his body was in an unmarked grave in the village of Kuntji Sidareja, northwest Cilacap Regency.

== Selected publications ==
- Kontrak-tanah dan nasib-tani (Pustaka-tani c.1950)
- Masalah perindustrian & pertanian (Jajasan Universitas-Rakjat, 1960)
- Untuk demokrasi, tanah, produksi, dan Irian Barat (Dewan Pimpinan Pusat Barisan Tani Indonesia, 1963)
- Masala-masalah landreform (Pembaruan, 1964, 2 vol.)
