= Peasants Front of Indonesia =

- Barisan Tani Indonesia
- Predecessor: Peasants Union
- Formation: November 25, 1945; 80 years ago
- Dissolved: March 12, 1966; 60 years ago
- Members: 5,7 Million (1962)
- Affiliations: Communist Party of Indonesia

Peasants Front of Indonesia (Indonesian: Barisan Tani Indonesia) was a peasant mass organisation connected to the Communist Party of Indonesia (PKI). BTI was founded 25 November 1945. The previous peasant organisation of PKI had been the Peasants Union (Serikat Tani) formed in 1945. Its final general chairman was Asmu, the PKI's main agricultural analyst, who was appointed to the position in July 1962. The organization struggled for land reform, and was suppressed along with PKI in 1965.

== Background ==
The BTI emerged in a context where Indonesia had been rocked successively by the Great Depression, the occupation by Japanese forces (1942-1945) and a war of Independence again the Dutch who sought to reassert colonial control (1945-1949). The period of Sukarno’s rule was described as one of ”lively, widespread and at times confusing political activity” in which average people took an active part. This include a proliferation of organizations by which people could express their views and seek redress for grievances. These institutions grew up amidst older systems of elite patronage but older restrictions on participation by gender and landholding status were eased. A full, multi-party democracy was present by the elections of 1955 and 1957.

The emergence of the Communist Party of Indonesia (PKI), of which the BTI was an affiliate, alarmed parts of the Indonesian military and many Western powers, especially the United States. At this time, the PKI claimed 3.5 million members, the largest Communist Party in a non-communist state. Unlike other Communist Parties in the world, the PKI was a legitimate, above ground party seeking a parliamentary road to power. They were considered the front-runners in the canceled 1959 election. When “Guided Democracy” was introduced, PKI members held seats in major decision making bodies at all levels of government. The BTI was one of the mass organizations affiliated with the PKI including prominently: GERWANI (the Indonesian Women's Movement), HSI (Indonesian Graduates’ Association, for intellectuals), LEKRA (the People's Cultural Institute, for artists and writers), Pemuda Rakyat (for Youth), SOBSI (for workers generally) as well as branches in particular fields (e.g. SARBUPRI for workers on plantations specifically.)

== Early Growth and Success ==
In 1951, after the disaster of the Manduin Affair in 1949, and complex interparty negotiations between various vacations, D. N. Aidit was elected to lead the PKI in January 1951. At that point, the PKI had complete control over the RTI (Rukun Tani Indonesia, Indonesian Peasants' Union), had clandestine control of the BTI, as well as influence in, SAKTI (Sarekat Tani Indonesia, Indonesian Peasants' Association). On July 2, 1951, PKI used its influence to establish the FPT (Front Persatuan Tani, Peasants' United Front) sharing a joint program of demands. By 1953, a total merger was proposed after the BTI had finished purging non-Communists from leadership within the organization. The executive of SAKTI was supportive but a small Trotskyist faction with the union, led by Acoma, succeeded in delaying the fusion for more that two years. A joint congress was held September 14 to 20, 1953 between BTI and TWI, where it was decided they would retain the name BTI. At the time, they claimed 240 000 members. Once the Communists had full control of SAKTI, a congress was held in June 1955 which approved fusion with BTI.

By March 1954 the, now united, organization began a period of rapid growth. By March 1954 BTI claimed 800,000 members, a year later they claimed a membership of over two million, by 1955, the claimed to have more than 3 million members. In April 1959 they claimed to have 3.5 million members which was about 14% of the adult peasant population. Although initially growth had been focused in Java by 1958 that expanded outside of Java especially in Atjeh, Bali, Flores, Sumba, and Timor. By 1962 they claimed 5.6 million members or 25% of the peasant population. At their height in 1963, 7.1 million people were claimed as members of the BTI.

== Focus of Work ==
The BTI campaigned vocally to fulfill what they saw as the unfinished promise of the Indonesian revolution against both Japanese and Dutch colonialism. In addition to political campaigns to fulfil that promise, they were involved in social and practical support of peasants. They helped farmers gain access to agricultural inputs, provided educational support, supported campaigns to eliminate the rat population that infested agricultural areas, and did pioneering research into the lives of rural peasants. While initially given a free hand to work with the people, they were increasingly clamped down on by the Indonesia state, Western nations, and private industry from the mid 1950s onward. This was, in part, due to the understanding of Indonesia as a Cold War “domino” which must be prevented from falling at all costs, with the capitalist world having already “lost” China and Eastern Europe. President Sukarno's withdrawal of Indonesia from the UN strained relations with the West, while at home, Sukarno had to carefully balance the three pillars of Nasakom (nationalism, religion, and communism) which proved difficult.

Land access was a vital political question in a post-independence Indonesia. During the Japanese occupation, those not forced to labour for the Japanese in Romusha system, were encouraged to occupy former Dutch plantations and deliver a portion of the proceeds to the Japanese forces. More than one third of the plantation lands in Indonesia were occupied in this way. After the war, those workers and peasants remained in the plantation areas and the BTI supported further land occupations. With their support, local people who otherwise lacked access to land, refugees from conflict zones, and former soldiers occupied plantations in order to create smallhold farms.

== Land Reform ==
By 1946, the Indonesian government began attempting to return plantation lands which had been occupied by peasants to their, mostly European, pre-war owners. In service of this, the Forest Service began evicting peasants who had occupied land. The BTI attempted to fight these evictions. Starting in 1954, the PKI began to claim the central place of agrarian revolution in the larger revolutionary changes happening in Indonesia. This found expression five years later in a campaign of “Unilateral actions (aksi sepihak)” which were intended to compel the enforcement of the Law on Share Tenancy (1959) and the Basic Agrarian Law (1960). The first occupation, which took place in 1963 in Jengkol, Kediri, was spontaneous. It led to the deaths of 38 of the attempted occupiers and the imprisonment of many more. The BTI argued that the people deserved access to the forest resources, not out of ability to manage the forests, but instead as an inalienable right to access means of production, though the broadness of this category meant it could be creatively interpreted.

Passing these laws were immediately important to the peasants. Economic decline and accelerating inflation meant that land was one of the few sources of local, reliable income in the early 1960s. Ben White claims that the model of land reform deployed in Indonesia “reproduced the typical ‘anti-communist’ model of land reform” which, with US backing, had succeeded in Japan, South Korea, and Taiwan, and failed in South Vietnam. These laws put limits on the total amount a land a farmer could own, banned absentee landlordism, called for the return of pawned land, stipulated the need for land redistribution and insisted on a sharecropping arrangement that shared the proceeds equally between owner and sharecropper.

Although the PKI and BTI protested the laws while they were being developed as giving insufficient attentions to the “Land to the Tiller” principle, once they had been passed, these groups worked vigorously to ensure proper follow through. In order to put pressure on the landlords and bureaucrats that were impending implementation, the BTI and related groups began forceful seizures of land. These actions brought the BTI into conflict with a number of groups: large land-owners, Muslim organizations like the Nahdlatul Ulema (NU – Council of Islamic Scholars) and especially it's youth wing, Ansor, who had fought for religious lands to be exempt for the policy, as well as the army which had taken over the running of several large, formerly-Dutch, plantations. The BTI defended actions by peasants to seize lands as in accordance with government policy intended to increase domestic food production especially as famine affected many people. In the last months of 1964, the aksi were scaled back. More than 2000 farmers had already been arrested. On December 3rd, Aidit admitted that the actions had failed and would be abandoned. Sukarno felt consultation and consensus was needed instead of direct force. Despite their short time frame, they had a significant impact on Indonesian history.

== Participatory Action Research ==
In April 1959, at the Peasants Conference, a proposal was accepted to being a significant program of rural research to give direction to the work of PKI activists and to increase awareness and understanding of socio-economic conditions. The PKI and BTI collaborated on three rounds of rural research which has been called “pathbreaking” research comparable to later work by Paolo Freire and Robert Chambers. Academics were specifically trained by the PKI/BTI to practice, the ‘three togethers’: work together, eat together and sleep together (with the people); the ‘four don’ts’: don't lodge with village elites, don't lecture the peasants, don't be the cause your host material losses, and don't take notes in front of the peasants; and the ‘four musts’: practice the ‘three togethers’; be modest, polite and ready to learn from the peasants; know and respect the local language and customs, and help to solve the problems of the host family, the peasants and the local Party”

The analysis done by the PKI resulted in the identification of the “seven village devils” who exploited the peasants including: landlords, usurers, middlemen, those who use their position in bureaucracy to enrich themselves, those who purchase crops in advance, village bandits, and evil village officials. The study also sought to understand how Indonesia food production could be improved for the benefit of all. Women's participation in all parts of the research was stressed and women made up several members of the research times. The results were gathered in a set of monographs but were never published due to the events of October 1965.

== 30th September Movement ==
Rumours circulated from mid-1965 on that a group of right-wing generals were planning a coup with US support. On the morning of October 1, 1965, six high-ranking military leaders and an adjutant to the Minister of Defense were kidnapped by leftist forces in the military, not affiliated with PKI, while a seventh general, Nasution, escaped. The kidnappers claimed that they had prevented a CIA-backed coup. Troops loyal to the plotters did not manage to seize control as they had intended and, the plotters, in a disorganized moment, killed their seven hostages rather than turn them over to the authorities for prosecution as initially planned. When counter-attacked, the rebels surrendered or fled. The attempted coup was over before most Indonesians knew it was happening. In response, the army, with support from the United States and the United Kingdom, as well as civilian support from right wing Muslim and nationalist groups, led a bloody suppression of the whole PKI, despite its lack of connection to the 30th of September Movement, in which 500 000 to 1 000 000 people were killed. The army directed the majority of the killed with support from Ansor in Central and East Java, the PNI’s affiliate Tameng Marhaen in Bali, and Catholic youth organisations in Flores and Timor. As White writes, “[the violence] was thoroughly regulated by agents of the state.”

== Aftermath ==
After the killings, no further attempts at agrarian reform were attempted and the subject became taboo. The BTI and other peasants organizers were banned and replaced with the “Indonesia Farmers’ Harmony Association” (Himpunan Kerukunan Tani Indonesia, HKTI) sponsored by the state and with no competition allowed. After the fall of Suharto, “The independent Indonesian Peasants’ Union (SPI; formerly the Federation of Indonesian Peasant Unions, FSPI), is a member, and Southeast Asian lead of Via Campesina but does not operate at anywhere near the scale of the BTI.
