= Sarbuksi =

Former trade union in Indonesia

Sarbuksi, short for Sarekat Buruh Kehutanan Seluruh Indonesia ('All Indonesia Forest Workers Union'), was a trade union of forest workers in Indonesia. Sarbuksi was affiliated to the trade union centre SOBSI, which was linked to the Communist Party of Indonesia. During its existence, Sarbuksi was highly influential in regards to forestry policies in Indonesia. As of January 1962, Sarbuksi claimed a membership of a quarter million.

The union was founded in Madiun in November 1945, with the name Sarekat Buruh Kehutanan ('Forest Workers Union', SBK). SBK did however, not organize forest labourers as such. By then end of the Indonesian National Revolution, the orientation of the union had changed towards leftist positions. The organization adopted the name Sarbuksi and began mass recruitment of forest labourers.

When the Forestry Service began mass eviction of peasant squatters with forest areas, Sarbuksi and the Peasants Front of Indonesia (BTI) mobilized joint resistance. Sarbuksi demanded that peasants be given land rights to forest areas they inhabited. Moreover, the union fought for higher wages for junior forestry officials. Non-revolutionary elements split off from Sarbuksi, forming a new union with the old name SBK.

As response to the growth of Sarbuksi, other forest workers union were formed. One such union was Sarekat Buruh Kehutanan Islam (SBKI). Moreover, a sector in the Forestry Service, which was opposed to Sarbuksi and the Communist Party, began pressing for legal action against land squatters. As of 1964 the anti-Sarbuksi sector had begun to organize trials, and undocumented settlements in forest areas were demolished by police forces soon after. Sarbuksi mobilized protests against this development.

Following the 1965 coup d'état, many Sarbuksi members were killed or imprisoned in camps. Surviving former Sarbuksi members were fired from their jobs at the Forestry Service. The stigma of having been associated with Sarbuksi was often passed on to children of former Sarbuksi members as well, who were met by suspicion in their communities. Sarbuksi was formally banned on 12 March 1966.
