= Njono =

Indonesian activist

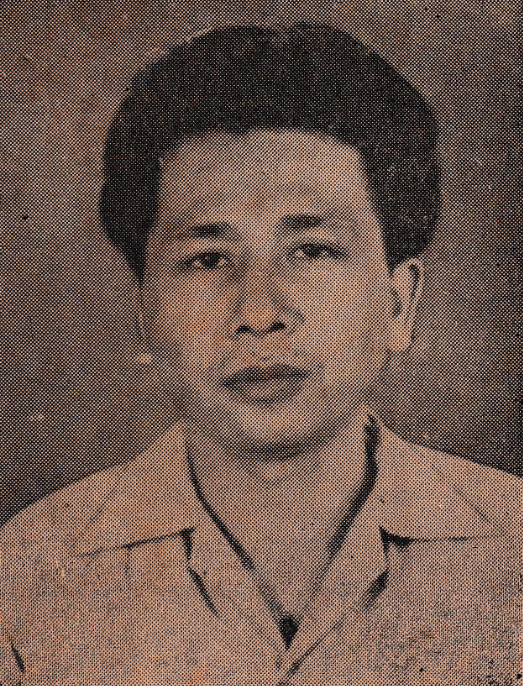

Chairman of SOBSI
- In office 1950–1964
- Preceded by: Asrarudin (acting); Harjono
- Succeeded by: Moh. Munir

Personal details
- Born: 28 August 1925 Cilacap, Dutch East Indies
- Died: October 1968 (aged 43) Indonesia
- Cause of death: Death penalty
- Party: PBI (1945–1948); PKI (1954–1965)
- Other political affiliations: SOBSI
- Spouse: Siti Mariam

Njono or Njono Prawiro (Perfected Spelling: Nyono, August 28, 1925 – October 1968) was a labor activist and member of the Politburo of the Communist Party of Indonesia (PKI). Njono was known as the Secretary-General and Chairman of the Central All-Indonesian Workers Organization (SOBSI) and a member of the Politburo of the PKI Central Committee who got involved in the September 30 Movement. Previously, Njono was a member of the Indonesian Labor Party (PBI) and served as its interim chairman.

== Early life ==
Njono was born in Cilacap 28 August 1925. (Note: Parlaungan wrote down 1922 as his year of birth.) He was the eldest son of Sastroredjo, a railway employee. In 1931, Njono studied at the Sekolah Rakjat (People's School) of Taman Siswa (Taman Muda) and completed it in 1938. He then continued to Taman Guru Muda but did not finish. He then worked as a young journalist at the Asia Raya newspaper in Jakarta during the Japanese occupation.

== Early political career ==
In the early period of independence, Njono served as a member of the Working Body of Central Indonesian National Djakarta Raya (Greater Jakarta) and concurrently as a member of the Central Indonesian National Committee. Njono also led the Tram Workers Union in Kramat before joining the Indonesian Labor Brigade (BBI) and becoming the leader of the Jakarta branch of BBI. Njono was then elected as the interim chairman of the Indonesian Labor Party (PBI) on 26 July 1946, replacing Sjamsu Harja Udaja, who was arrested after the failed July 1946 coup, with Setyadjit Soegondo as the interim deputy. In November 1946, as part of the negotiations between the Netherlands and Indonesia leading up to the Linggarjati Agreement, various subcommittees were formed on the suggestion of the joint commission for civil affairs. Njono became a member of the labor affairs subcommittee.

To address the party's deteriorating condition, Njono held a party conference in Solo on 5 October 1946 to carry out "self-correction, selection, and centralization" (Note: "zelfcorrectie, selectie, dan centralisatie.") by changing the party's direction to a more moderate stance in order to attract broader support from various backgrounds of workers. Policy statements asserting that the party adhered to Marxism–Leninism principles and addressing class conflict were removed. Based on the results of the PBI Congress in Malang on 6 April 1947, Njono was elected as vice-chairman, while Setyadjit became the party's chairman.

== SOBSI ==
Njono became the Secretary General of SOBSI in November 1946. He served as the head of the SOBSI delegation for the 2nd WFTU Conference in Beijing and departed on 5 January 1950. Njono then became the chairman of SOBSI upon his return from the visit on 19 November. Furthermore, Njono was also appointed as the Vice President of the World Federation of Trade Unions (WFTU) since 1953.

Under his leadership, SOBSI became increasingly dominated by the PKI, a process that began in late October 1949 when SOBSI resumed its activities after being halted due to the Madiun Affair. By mid-1951, almost all SOBSI members were subject to the leadership of the PKI. The unions under its umbrella also became increasingly dominated or influenced by the PKI.

In September 1960, Njono proposed the establishment of workers' councils in every state-owned enterprise with the status of advisory bodies for "all matters." This proposal emerged as an effort by SOBSI cadres to dominate the economic field and provide communist unions with a counterbalance capable of improving the welfare of their members. Therefore, this proposal was immediately supported by communist-affiliated organizations. The government implemented this proposal, but the cadres from labor and peasant unions only served as advisors without having any control over production management, which was far from what SOBSI had hoped for.

== Member of PKI ==
Despite having a close relationship with D.N. Aidit and often being considered to have been a member of the PKI for a long time, Njono officially applied to join the PKI in December 1954. He was elected as a member of the DPR, representing the PKI in 1955. Njono was then inaugurated as a candidate member of the Politburo as a result of the Sixth National Congress of the PKI held on 7–14 September 1959 and officially became a member of the Politburo in February 1963. Njono also became the chairman of the PKI's Greater Jakarta Regional Committee (CDB) in September 1964. Hence, he resigned as Chairman of the National Council of SOBSI.

== Involvement in the G30S ==
Njono played a role in dividing Jakarta into six sectors, where civilian volunteers were prepared as reserves to carry out operations in each sector. Most of the volunteers came from the People's Youth and had received military training at Lubang Buaya. However, only the Gambir sector carried out the task of occupying the Telecommunications Building (now Telkom STO Gambir Building).

Additionally, he organized a network consisting of various posts, probably located in members' homes or party offices. These posts would be manned by PKI members at the Section Committee (CS) level, who were instructed to remain vigilant and continuously listen to the radio during the action. Njono planned to mobilize them to hold demonstrations if the movement could endure longer.

== Death ==
Due to his involvement in the September 30 Movement, Njono was arrested by the military on October 3, 1965. On February 14, 1966, Njono faced trial at the Bappenas Building in Menteng and was sentenced to death on February 21 through a verdict of the Extraordinary Military Tribunal (Mahmilub). Njono was eventually executed in October 1968.

== Personal life ==
Njono had one daughter as his only child and a wife named Siti Mariam. His wife was detained since October 1965 at Bukit Duri Prison, before being transferred to Plantungan Camp in April 1971. As his death approached, Njono wrote three poems, one of which was addressed to the family he would leave behind. During his trial, he identified himself as irreligious (tidak beragama).

== Bibliographies ==
- "Gerakan 30 September" Dihadapan Mahmilub I: Perkara Njono. Jakarta: Pusat Pendidikan Kehakiman AD. 1966.
- Anderson, Benedict R.O'G; McVey, Ruth Thomas (2009). A Preliminary Analysis of the October 1, 1965 Coup in Indonesia. Jakarta: Equinox Publishing. ISBN 978-602-8397-52-0.
- Elson, R.E. (2001). Suharto: A Political Biography. Cambridge: Cambridge University Press.
- Hindley, Donald (1966). The Communist Party of Indonesia, 1951-1963. Berkeley: University of California Press. ISBN 978-0520005617.
- Parlaungan (1956). Hasil Rakjat Memilih Tokoh-tokoh Parlemen (Hasil Pemilihan Umum Pertama - 1955) di Republik Indonesia. Jakarta: C.V. Gita.
- Roosa, John (2008). Dalih Pembunuhan Massal: Gerakan 30 September dan Kudeta Suharto. Jakarta: Institut Sejarah Sosial Indonesia. ISBN 978-979-17579-0-4.
- Sekretariat DPR-GR (1970). Seperempat Abad Dewan Perwakilan Rakjat Republik Indonesia.
- Sutter, John O. (1959). Indonesianisasi: Politics in a Changing Economy, 1940-1955, Vol. 2. New York: Cornell University.

Trade union offices
Preceded by Asrarudin (acting); Harjono	Chairman of SOBSI; 1950–1964	Succeeded by Moh. Munir
