= CGMI =

CGMI may refer to:

- Church of God Mission International
- Consentrasi Gerakan Mahasiswa Indonesia
