= Sarbufis =

Former trade union in Indonesia

Sarbufis, short for Sarekat Buruh Film dan Sandiwara (Film and Theatre Workers Union), was a trade union in Indonesia. Sarbufis was affiliated to the trade union centre SOBSI, which was linked to the Communist Party of Indonesia. As of January 1960, Sarbufis claimed a membership of 6,000. Kastari was the general secretary of Sarbufis.

The organization was founded in 1951, with the name Sarekat Buruh Film Indonesia (Film Workers Union of Indonesia, abbreviated Sarbufi). It was the first professional organization of the workers of the film industry. The union joined SOBSI immediately after its formation. The second Sarbufi congress, held in 1953, adopted the name Sarbufis. Amongst the members of Sarbufis were actors of ketoprak, a form of Javanese traditional drama with political commentary. However, the main activity of the union remained in the film sector.

In 1955 Sarbufis initiated a campaign to ban American newsreel films. The union stated that the American newsreels propagated nuclear war. The Jakarta branch of Sarbufis claimed to have collected thousands of signatures supporting their demand, including that of prominent film maker Tan Sing Hwat (a prominent director, LEKRA member and an official of Sarbufis). Later, Sarbufis took part in founding the Action Committee for Boycott of Imperialist American Films. Moreover, the organization called for banning of British imports in 1963, in response to the expulsion of the Indonesian consulate from Sabah.

Sarbufis was crushed following the 1965 coup d'état. The organization was formally banned on 12 March 1966.
