= Communism in Sumatra =

Communism in Sumatra has historically had an influence in the politics and society of Sumatra. Padang, Pariaman, Silungkang, Sawah Lunto, Alahan Panjang, and Suliki of West Sumatra have been cited as an area which was particular active in communism.

== History ==
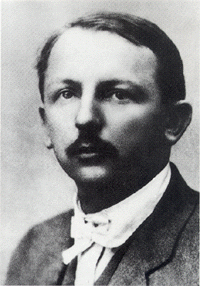
Hendricus Sneevliet

In May 1914, Hendricus Sneevliet (alias Maring) established the Indies Social-Democratic Association (ISDV), which became the Communist Association of the Indies (Perserikatan Komunis di Hindia) in May 1920 and the Communist Party of Indonesia (PKI) in 1924. Backed by the Communist International (Comintern) in Moscow, the PKI became active among trade unionists and rural villagers in Sumatra. In 1926 and 1927, despite advice by Tan Malaka, a Comintern agent from Sumatra, to the contrary, local leaders instigated rural insurrections in western Java and Sumatra. The government moved decisively to crush the insurrections and imprison communist leaders. Some, like Tan Malaka, fled into exile. But 1,300 communists were exiled to the grim Boven Digul penal colony in West New Guinea. The PKI all but disappeared, not to be an important actor on the political stage until after independence. Perhaps the most prominent outbreak was the 1927 Communist Uprising in Sumatra. When the Japanese invaded Sumatra in 1942, the Communist party in North Sumatra refrained from joining in the resistance against the Japanese.

Incidentally, Hadji Abdullah Ahmad, a noted anti-communist and religious leader was from the Minangkabau Highlands, where communism was active. Numerous examples of anti-communist resentment also occurred, for instance during the Indonesian killings of 1965–1966, PKI-organised squatters' movements and campaigns against foreign businesses in Sumatra's plantations provoked quick reprisals against Communists.

Repression against alleged PKI members and sympathizers continued for several years. As late as 1976 mass lay-offs of former members of the communist plantation workers' union Sarbupri members took place in Sumatra, actions motivated by the communist past of these individuals.

== PRRI rebellion ==
During the PRRI rebellion, the insurgents arrested leftist activists and placed them in detention camps in West Sumatra. PKI cadres were detained at Situjuh and Suliki, whilst followers of the national communist Murba Party and other groups were detained at the Muara Labuh camp.

== PKI in Aceh ==
In the northernmost province of Sumatra, Aceh, PKI was rather weak in the heyday of the party. There were around 2,000–3,000 communists in Aceh during the early 1960s. The party membership was largely made up by Javanese migrant labourers, such as plantation and railway workers. The establishment of PKI in Aceh was met with stern resistance from the local ulema. Notably PKI had opposed giving provincial status to Aceh, a position that isolated the party in Acehnese politics. When an armed rebellion, seeking the establishment of an Islamic state in Aceh, broke out in 1951 many PKI members left Aceh.

When a provincial DPRD (council) for Aceh was appointed by the Minister of Home Affairs in January 1957, PKI was allocated one out of thirty seats. In 1961 a new provincial DPRD was appointed, with two seats for PKI.

The first massacres of PKI sympathizers during the 1965–1966 took place in Aceh. Reports emerged from Aceh that thousands were killed in the massacres, in which entire families of alleged PKI sympathizers along with their domestic servants were annihilated. The First Secretary of the PKI branch in Aceh, Samikidin, was executed. An all-Acehnese conference ulema and military officers held December 15–16, 1965 issued a fatwa stating that any Muslim that died in combat with PKI would be considered a martyr. Moreover, the conference labelled communism haram and called for the abolition of PKI. Through provincial legislation PKI was formally banned in Aceh in December 1965, whilst the party was only formally banned in the rest of Indonesia in March 1966.

== PKI in East Sumatra ==
An East Sumatra District Committee of PKI was set up in 1950. A. Indigo, Abdullah Nst., B. Siagian, Ngalimum and Hasan Raid were leading figures of the District Committee. By the early 1960s, PKI had a mass following in the plantation areas of East Sumatra. The party was, organizationally speaking, the strongest political force in the area at the time.
