= Serbuni =

Former trade union in Indonesia

- Headquarters: 35 Djalan Tanggorang, Djakarta
- Location: Indonesia
- Key people: K. Werdojo, general secretary
- Affiliations: SOBSI

Serbuni, short for Serikat Buruh Unilever Indonesia ('Unilever Workers Union of Indonesia'), was a trade union of workers at the factories of Unilever in Indonesia. During the late 1950s and early 1960s, Serbuni was the largest of the four trade unions at the Unilever factories in the country. Serbuni was affiliated to the trade union centre SOBSI, which was linked to the Communist Party of Indonesia (PKI). K. Werdojo was the general secretary of Serbuni.

From 1956 onwards unions at the four Unilever factories in Indonesia (three in Jakarta, one in Surabaya) became increasingly active, particularly Serbuni. The unions demands shares of the profits of the factories. Serbuni initiated militant agitations at the time of the 1963/1964 Konfrontasi, following similar attacks at the British Embassy and Shell Oil installations. In December 1963 the organization began picketing Unilever factories. In the latter half of January 1964, the union tried to capture the Djakarta head office and factories of Unilever. On 18 January 1964 Serbuni seized control over the Angke factory in Djakarta. A statement issued by Serbuni claimed that the occupation was a reaction to Konfrontasi, British imperialism, seizure of two Hajj ships and statements made by president Sukarno. The unionists were however expelled by local police. The union tried to occupy the Colibri factory in Surabaya on 25 January 1964, but were evicted by police. At Angke a joint supervisory committee with Serbuni representation was instituted by the police, whilst at Colibri control was handed back to the Unilever management.

David Kenneth Fieldhouse argues that Serbuni did not formally seize control of the Unilever factories, as foreign enterprises taken over by unions were nationalized by presidential decree. In the nationalized industries independent unions were banned, a move that would have threatened the position of Serbuni. Thus Fieldhouse states that Serbuni's actions at the time of Konfrontasi actually sought to prevent nationalization.
