= Serbaud =

Former air transport workers union in Indonesia

Serbaud, short for Serikat Buruh Angkatan Udara ('Air Transport Workers Union'), was a trade union of air transport employees and workers in Indonesia. Serbaud was affiliated to the trade union centre SOBSI, which was linked to the Communist Party of Indonesia. Serbaud was estimated to have less than 3,000 members.

Around 1964 Serbaud propagated boycotts against Pan Am, refusing to service Pan Am flights. Moreover, Serbaud refused to service the aircraft chartered by the U.S. embassy. In December 1964 Serbaud organised protests outside the U.S. embassy, charging it with using a 'spy plane'.

Serbaud held its third congress 25–27 June 1965.
