= Sarekat Buruh Kehutanan Islam =

Sarekat Buruh Kehutanan Islam ('Islamic Forest Workers Union', abbreviated SBKI) was a trade union of forest workers in Indonesia. SBKI was founded in 1965. SBKI, formed by Islamic foresters, sought to counter the influence of the communist-aligned Sarbuksi union. SBKI was affiliated with the Islamic trade union centre SARBUMUSI.
