= Kehidupan Partai =

Indonesian Communist Party Journal

Kehidupan Partai ('Party Life') was a journal issued in Djakarta by the Agitprop Department of the Central Committee of the Communist Party of Indonesia (PKI). The publication was initially known as PKI-Buletin. The publication was mainly intended for party members. Kehidupan Partai carried short articles from different regions of the country, dealing with local experiences of various aspects of party activism. It also carried important statements from the party leadership as well as news from communist movements abroad.

PKI-Buletin began publication in February 1952. Initially in appeared every 2–3 weeks, but by the end of 1953 it was converted into a monthly magazine. On January 1, 1955 the name was changed to Kehidupan Partai.

Kehidupan Partai reappeared in October 1956. Between May and December 1957 only two issues were published, as few party branches provided material for the publication.

As of 1960, the price of a copy of Kehidupan Partai was one rupiah.
