= Samikidin =

Indonesian politician (died 1965)

Muhamad Samikidin (died 1965) was an Indonesian politician. He served as the First Secretary of the Aceh Committee of the Communist Party of Indonesia (PKI).

Samikidin was executed in 1965.
