= Indonesian communist exiles in Tirana =

Political refugees in Albania

Cover of a French edition of Api Pemuda Indonesia (the title of the article reads: "Suharto's fascist military regime is a common enemy of the revolutionary people of Indonesia and all the freedom-loving people all over the world")

Following the military take-over in Indonesia and the massacres of 1965–66, the Albanian capital Tirana became one of the main hubs for exiled members and sympathizers of the pro-Chinese wing of the Communist Party of Indonesia (PKI). According to professor Justus van der Kroef there were about forty Indonesian communists staying in Tirana in the early 1970s, around half of them organized in the Persatuan Peladjar Indonesia ('Indonesian Students Association'). The Tirana-based group often acted as spokespersons of the party.

== Establishment ==
According to Ruth McVey the establishment of Tirana as a hub for PKI exiles began with the 5th congress of the Party of Labour of Albania (PPSh) in November 1966. The PKI delegation at the congress was led by Jusuf Adjitorop, a candidate member of the PKI politburo before the coup. Now he headed the PKI Delegation in Beijing, having survived the purge of PKI by being in China for medical treatment prior to the coup. In his address to the Albanian party congress, Adjitorop called for the reconstruction of PKI under the banner of Marxism–Leninism and Mao Tse-Tung Thought, calling for protracted armed struggle of the peasantry to overthrow the rule of Suharto and Nasution. Following the Albanian party congress Tirana became the main centre of the pro-Chinese wing of the PKI in exile, rather than Beijing. The dominant view is that neither the Chinese government nor the PKI wished that the party would be perceived as too closely linked to China. Another key factor was that Tirana was geographically close to other hubs of exiled Indonesian student activists across Eastern Europe. Notably the PKI had opted not to condemn the Albanian party at the 1961 Congress of the Communist Party of the Soviet Union in Moscow.

== Publishing activities ==
An English-language bimonthly journal, Indonesian Tribune, was issued from Tirana. The publishing house of Indonesian Tribune was called Indonesia Progresif ('Indonesian Progressive'). The Persatuan Peladjar Indonesia ('Indonesian Students Association') in Albania published the journal Api Pemuda Indonesia ('Flame of Indonesian Youth').

Indonesian Tribune and Api Pemuda Indonesia were the two main organs of the pro-Chinese wing of PKI. These publications were illegal inside Indonesia, and one could be arrested for possessing a copy. They were distributed by mail to Indonesia, posted from non-communist states (in particular via the Netherlands). By the late 1970s, circulation of these organs had dropped significantly. In the midst of the Sino-Albanian split some Indonesian communists left Albania. As a result, the publishing activity of the Indonesian group in Tirana decreased. The International Institute of Social History holds a number of issues of Api Pemuda Indonesia, spanning from 1968 to 1978. It also holds a smaller number of copies of Indonesian Tribune, issued between 1966 and 1975.

Swie Siauw Poh and Ernest Pinontoean were key organizers of the Tirana group. The writer Chalik Hamid, who had travelled to Albania to study journalism before the coup, was one of the members of the group that produced Indonesian Tribune and Api Pemuda Indonesia and worked as translator for Radio Tirana. He stayed in Albania until 1989.

== Radio Tirana ==
In March 1967 Radio Tirana declared that it would begin broadcasts in Indonesian twice daily. Radio Tirana discontinued its Indonesian broadcasts in 1991.
