= Sarbupri =

Trade union in Indonesia (1947–1965)

The Estate Workers Union of the Republic of Indonesia (Indonesian: Sarekat Buruh Perkebunan Republik Indonesia, Sarbupri) was a trade union of plantation estate workers in Indonesia. As of the late 1950s, it was the largest trade union in the country. Sarbupri was affiliated to the trade union centre SOBSI, which was linked to the Communist Party of Indonesia.

== Indonesian National Revolution ==
Sarbupri was founded in February 1947. Sarbupri initially worked only in the Republican-held areas. Its activities at this point were not so much union organizing at estates, as the organization was more involved in building workers' militias to fight the Dutch forces. Most of organizing of workers at the estates was likely limited to preparing the labourers for scorched earth tactics in case of a Dutch advance.

The Sarbupri chairman Maruto Darusman was killed in the midst of the 1948 Madiun Affair.

== Strikes of 1950 & 1953 ==
In the early 1950s Sarbupri was the sole estate workers trade union of national importance in the country. A massive strike was organized by Sarbupri August–September 1950, bringing the vast majority of private estates to a halt. As a result of the strike, the government intervened and instituted a minimum wage for estate labour (significantly higher than previous average wages). The strike constituted the first major victory of SOBSI. A second major strike was organized in September 1953, forcing the government to implement a 30% wage increase for estate workers.

Sarbupri campaigned actively against the use of temporary labour at estates. At times the union called for increased government control to prevent the use of temporary labour, at times Sarbupri called for total abolition of the temporary labour system.

== Organization ==
In 1952 Sarbupri claimed a membership of around 700,000, although that figure was likely inflated. Around 1956 the membership was estimated at 370–390,000. Sarbupri published the journal Warta Sarbupri.

Suparna Sastradiredja was the general secretary throughout the history of the union.

In 1957, Sarbupri formed a joint coordination body together with seven other estate workers unions.

== Repression and aftermath ==
The exact number of Sarbupri members who fell victims of the persecutions following the 1965 coup d'état is not known. However, notably, very few former Sarbupri local branch leaders or estate representatives were alive as of the early 1980s. Suparna Sastradiredja survived by being in China at the time of the coup.

In several cases, children of Sarbupri leaders were forced to observe the executions of their fathers. For survivors of the repression, their membership in Sarbupri continued to constitute a social stigma for many years to come. In the New Order, former Sarbupri members were often blacklisted and fired from employment at plantation estates (although such moves were difficult to implement at estates where around 90% of the staff had once belonged to Sarbupri). As late as 1976, mass lay-offs of former Sarbupri members took place in Sumatra, actions motivated by the communist past of these individuals. In the wake of the crushing of Sarbupri, use of temporary labour increased markedly.
