= National Front (Indonesia) =

State-led mass organization in Indonesia

- Front Nasional
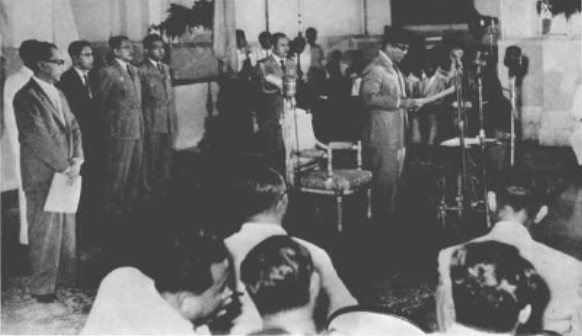
- Soekarno appointing the Central Board of the National Front (1960)
- Successor: Pancasila Front
- Formation: December 31, 1959; 66 years ago
- Dissolved: September 27, 1966; 60 years ago
- Type: State mass organization
- Location: Indonesia
- Leader: Sukarno

The National Front (Indonesian: Front Nasional) was a state-led mass organization in Indonesia during the Guided Democracy era (1959 - 1966) under President Sukarno. Formally established on December 31, 1959, based on President Regulation No. 13 of 1959, the National Front's stated tasks were "gathering and uniting revolutionary forces within society to complete the National Revolution" and "establishing close cooperation with the government and other state institutions". In practice, the National Front functioned as an instrument to implement Sukarno's ideas of Guided Democracy and rallied the population around national causes such as the "return of West Irian (now Papua) to the territorial sovereignty of the Republic of Indonesia." It was led by a Central Board, which was chaired by President Sukarno.

After West Irian was successfully integrated into Indonesia in 1963, the National Front's focus shifted to aligning the population with Sukarno's broader geopolitical and ideological goals. The Communist Party of Indonesia (PKI) and the military competed for influence within the organization. Over time, the PKI asserted control and dominated the National Front, exploiting its platform to strengthen its own political influence.

The National Front was dissolved on September 27, 1966, through Presidential Decree No. 214 of 1966, during the transition to the New Order. It was succeeded by the Pancasila Front, which was actively backed by the military, and helped in eradicating remnants of the PKI across Jakarta and the rest of Indonesia.

The ideology of the National Front was named USDEK, which stood for:

- Undang-Undang Dasar 1945 (the 1945 Constitution),
- Sosialisme Indonesia (Indonesian Socialism),
- Demokrasi Terpimpin (Guided Democracy),
- Ekonomi Terpimpin (Guided Economy), and
- Kepribadian Indonesia (Indonesian Identity).
