= SEBDA =

Former trade union in Indonesia

Serikat Buruh Daerah Autonoom ('Trade Union of Autonomous Government Employees', abbreviated SEBDA) was a trade union in Indonesia. SEBDA organized local government employees at the kabupaten and autonomous town level. The union was founded in June 1947. SEBDA was affiliated to the SOBSI trade union centre. As of 1956 S. Haryawisastra served as general secretary of SEBDA. As of 1957 SEBDA claimed to have 73,000 members. By May 1960 SEBDA had 82,000 members. Many of the SEBDA members were rural and/or seasonal labourers.
