= PKI dan Perwakilan =

Communist Party of Indonesia journal

PKI dan Perwakilan cover, 1960

PKI dan Perwakilan ('PKI and the Representative Councils') was a quarterly journal published from Djakarta by the Communist Party of Indonesia (PKI) 1956–1964. The publication was initially known as PKI dan DPR and was founded in June 1956. The name was changed to PKI dan Perwakilan after the local council elections of 1957. The magazine sought to provide information about the activities of the party inside parliament and local councils.

As of 1960, the price of a copy of PKI dan Perwakilan was six rupiah.
