= Consentrasi Gerakan Mahasiswa Indonesia =

Indonesian organization of university students

Concentration of Indonesian Students Movements
- Consentrasi Gerakan Mahasiswa Indonesia
- Abbreviation: CGMI
- Established: 1956
- Dissolved: November 1, 1965; 61 years ago
- Type: Student organization
- Region served: Indonesia
- Members: ± 17,000 (1963)
- Affiliations: Communist Party of Indonesia

Consentrasi Gerakan Mahasiswa Indonesia (Movement Concentration of Indonesian Students, abbreviated CGMI) was an organization of university students in Indonesia, linked to the Communist Party of Indonesia. CGMI was founded in 1956, through the merger of communist-led university student groups in Bogor, Bandung and Yogyakarta (which had emerged in the early 1950s). At the time of its founding, CGMI had a membership of around 1,180.

As of early 1960, CGMI claimed a membership of around 7,000. The Yogyakarta and Bandung branches claimed a membership of around 1,750 members each. The organization claimed 500 members in Surabaya, 400 in Malang and 300 at the University of Indonesia in Djakarta. Rival student organizations estimated the CGMI membership at around 4,000. By 1963 CGMI claimed a membership of around 17,000. The expansion could be explained, at least partially, due to recruitment in different institutions founded by the Communist Party (such as UNRA). Officially a non-partisan organization, CGMI was the sole university students movement open to students regardless of political and religious orientation. The vast majority of CGMI members were, however, supporters of the Communist Party.

CGMI ran various social and political campaigns. It campaigned against imperialism (Dutch, British and American), supporting the national government against the PRRI rebellion. It staunchly opposed hazing of new students. The organization campaigned for increased student allowances and reduction of prices of student literature. Regarding culture, CGMI campaigned against 'rock n' roll culture' (which it saw as un-Indonesian). The organization also organized sports activities, such as in table tennis and badminton. CGMI also organized excursions for students.

Hardoyo (a Member of Parliament) became the national president of CGMI in 1962. In the first half of the 1960s, clashes between pro- and anti-government student organizations rocked many Indonesian universities. CGMI belonged to the pro-government camp, supporting the GMNI. CGMI demanded that the pro-Masjumi student organization be banned (Masjumi had already been banned).

CGMI held its third congress just before the 1965 military take-over. Sukarno addressed the congress on September 29, 1965. CGMI was banned after the military take-over. It had first been "frozen" by the government on November 1, 1965.
