= People's Democratic Front (Indonesia) =

Leftist political coalition in Indonesia

- Front Demokrasi Rakjat
- Flag of the FDR, which uses the Indonesian flag
- Leader: Amir Sjarifuddin
- Founded: February 1948
- Dissolved: December 1948
- Merger of: PKI (Musso); PS; PBI; SOBSI; Pesindo
- Country: Indonesia
- Allegiance: Soviet Republic of Indonesia: Government of the National Front of the Region of Madiun
- Headquarters: Surakarta (February ‒ September 1948); Madiun (September ‒ December 1948)
- Political position: Left-wing politics

People's Democratic Front (Indonesian: Front Demokrasi Rakjat, FDR) was a short-lived united front of leftists in Indonesia, founded in February 1948. FDR included the Communist Party of Indonesia, the Socialist Party, Labour Party of Indonesia, SOBSI and Pesindo. The leader of FDR was Amir Sjarifuddin.
