= Madiun Affair =

1948 Indonesian conflict against leftists

- Part of the Indonesian National Revolution
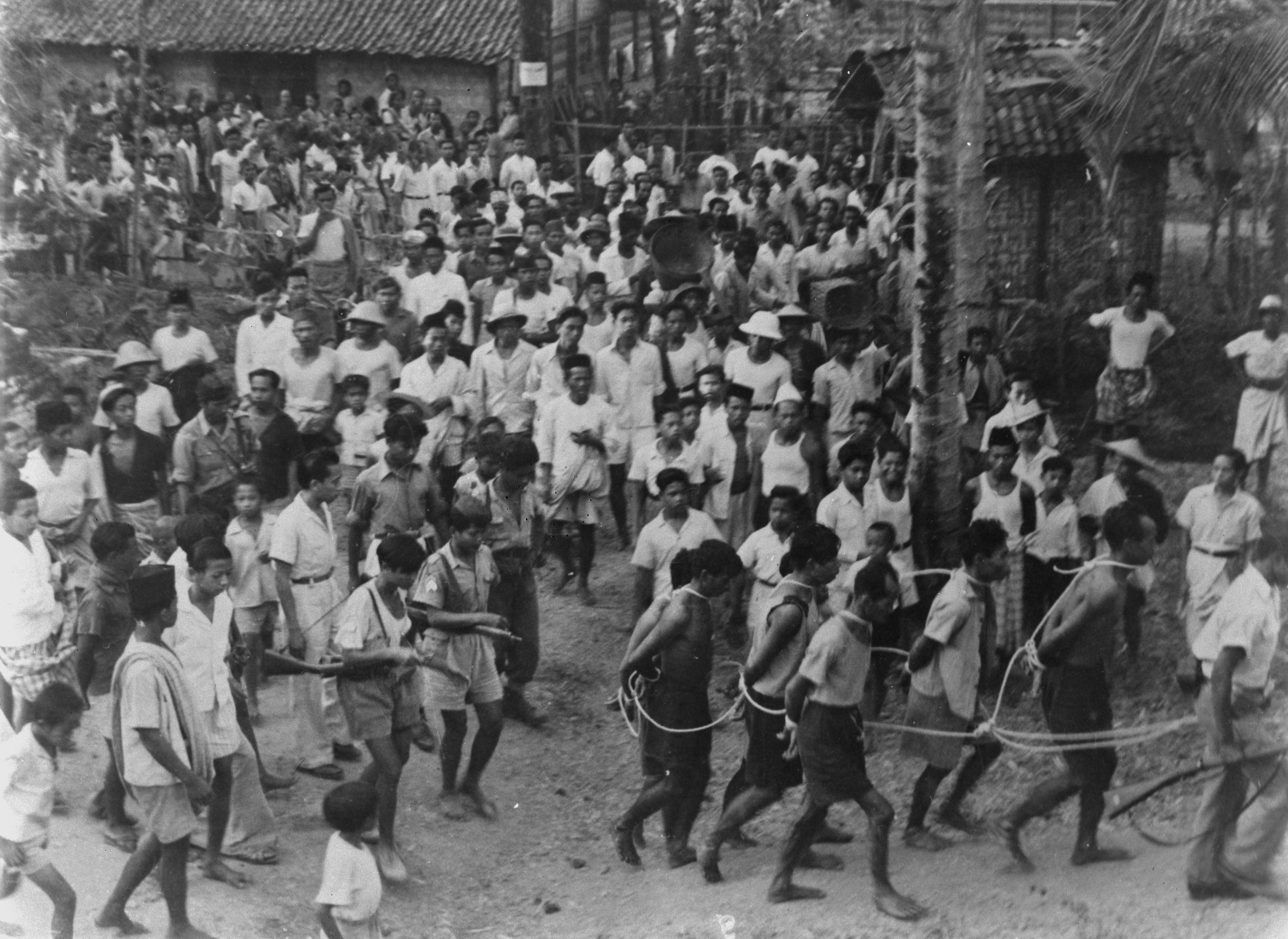
- A group of handcuffed communists being detained by the Indonesian Army in Madiun, September 1948
Date	18 September – 19 December 1948
Location	Madiun and Magetan, East Java
Result	Indonesian victory; Dissolution of People's Democratic Front

Belligerents
Indonesia; TNI; POLRI	People's Democratic Front; PKI; PS; PBI; SOBSI; Pesindo

Commanders and leaders
(Indonesia) Sukarno (Indonesia) Mohammad Hatta (Indonesia) Sudirman (Indonesia) Gatot Soebroto (Indonesia) Nasution (Indonesia) Suharto	(Indonesia) Musso (executed) (Indonesia) Amir Sjarifuddin (executed) (Indonesia) D. N. Aidit (Indonesia) M. H. Lukman (Indonesia) Njoto

Casualties and losses
1,920 killed (including civilians) in Madiun; 108 killed (including civilians) in Magetan	Unknown killed 24,000–35,000 captured

The Madiun Affair (Indonesian: Peristiwa Madiun, lit. 'Madiun Event'), also known as the 1948 PKI Rebellion (Pemberontakan PKI 1948) or the PKI Madiun Rebellion (Pemberontakan PKI Madiun), was an armed conflict between the Indonesian government and the left-wing People's Democratic Front (FDR), during the Indonesian National Revolution. The conflict began on September 18, 1948, in Madiun, East Java, and ended three months later when most FDR leaders and members were detained and executed by TNI forces.

== Background ==
=== The downfall of the Sjarifuddin Cabinet and the formation of the Hatta Cabinet ===
Opinions regarding the trigger of the conflict vary. According to Kreutzer, the downfall of Amir Sjarifuddin's government in January 1948 was the origin of the Madiun Affair. Before then, during the second half of 1947, Partai Sosialis was split into two factions: one faction was led by Sjarifuddin, and a smaller faction was led by Sutan Sjahrir. The latter group grew as Sjarifudin put a strong emphasis on its alignment with the Soviet Union and class struggle. Sjahrir believed that the Marxist doctrine of class struggle could not be applied in the Indonesian community as there was no such Indonesian bourgeoisie and that Indonesia should maintain a "positive neutrality" so that Indonesia could contribute to world peace. The party completely split soon after the establishment of Hatta's presidential cabinet.

Sjarifuddin's premiership ended on January 28, 1948. Sjahrir, Dr. Leimena, and several political activists had earlier approached Hatta and requested him to become the next prime minister. Hatta agreed if he got the PNI's and Masjumi's support. Driven by the need to form a cabinet with national support (both right-wing and left-wing), Hatta offered Sjarifuddin's faction some posts in the cabinet. They declined Hatta's offer and demanded key positions, including Sjarifuddin's position as Minister of Defense (in the previous cabinet, Sjarifuddin had been both Prime Minister and Minister of Defense) in return for their support for Hatta's government. Negotiation failed, and on January 31, 1948, Hatta finally formed a cabinet without the Sajap Kiri (left-wing) parties. Two members of Partai Sosialis, however, were included in the cabinet by the strong request of Sjahrir. He and the two cabinet members were expelled from the Partai Sosialis and formed their party called Partai Sosialis Indonesia (PSI, the Socialist Party of Indonesia). "This new party immediately gave its support to Hatta's government." Hatta's program of government was based on two priorities: the implementation of the Renville Agreement and the rationalization of the Indonesian army.

=== Formation of FDR ===
The Sajap Kiri (without Sjahrir's faction) gradually went into opposition. In the beginning, it tried to get a place in the government by showing a willingness to cooperate. However, its attempt failed when it faced the bitter reality that there were no faction members included in the cabinet. At a mass meeting at Surakarta on February 26, the Sajap Kiri underwent reorganization and emerged as the Front Demokrasi Rakjat (FDR; People's Democratic Front); led by Amir Sjarifuddin, it comprised the Partai Sosialis, PKI, PBI, Pesindo, and the trade union federation SOBSI. Some weeks after the meeting, the FDR program was radically changed to include (1) opposition to the Renville Agreement, (2) discontinuation of negotiations with the Dutch, and (3) nationalization of all foreign enterprises. Its strong opposition against Hatta's cabinet was clear from the first objective of the program. Hatta's cabinet's main goal was to implement the Renville Agreement, but the FDR's was to reject it.

The FDR had two principal bases of strength: within the army and among labor. In his capacity of Minister of Defense from July 3, 1947, to January 28, 1948, Sjarifuddin had "managed to build up a strong personal opposition within the army." He secured officers' loyalty in the army, the TNI (Tentara National Indonesia; Indonesian National Army). The loyal military officers were often the ones who knew the location of numerous arms and munitions kept in the mountainous areas in anticipation of further Dutch military action. Even more important was the strong position that Sjarifuddin had built himself within the army's supplementary organization, the TNI Masjarakat (People's TNI). Established in early August 1947 (when Sjarifuddin was the Prime Minister), the organization was aimed at organizing popular defense on a local basis to support the army. While the TNI was a national organization, the TNI Masjarakat, led by Colonel Djoko Sujono, was a local-based military organization. It was obvious that during his premiership, Sjarifuddin had managed to build strong national and local military organizations, which were prepared to confront the Dutch.

In addition, the FDR had a dominant position within SOBSI (Sentral Organisasi Buruh Seluruh Indonesia), by far the largest labor organization in Indonesia. The membership of that organization was mainly urban and plantation labor with the Republic and was estimated to be between 200,000 and 300,000.

=== Hatta's rationalization program and impact on FDR's military strength ===
From the Indonesian government's perspective, rationalization was the solution to the economic problem by reducing the number of military forces. A month after the establishment of his cabinet, Hatta began the rationalization program based on Presidential Decree No.9 27 February 1948. The main objective of the rationalization was to reorganize the military organizations and mobilize a productive labor force from defense to production sectors. According to Hatta, there were three ways to achieve those objectives: 1) demobilizing military officers who wanted to return to their previous jobs (teachers, private employees), 2) sending the military officers back to the Ministry of Development and youth, and 3) demobilizing hundreds of military officers to return to their village communities.

In 1948, the Indonesian Republic faced a critical situation in which there was an excessive labor supply because of the enormous number of refugees fleeing to the Republic from the areas overrun by the Dutch such as Surabaya (located adjacent to Madiun, Surabaya was then still controlled by the Dutch). In addition, there were at least 200,000 excess troops but an inadequate number of arms and munitions for them. To anticipate the critical problems (economic, military, and political) emerging from that situation, Hatta and his cabinet immediately decided to embark upon a rationalization program. At the initial stage of reorganization, there were 160,000 troops left. This program was expected to leave only 57,000 regular troops at the end.

On May 15, 1948, the TNI Masjarakat, or laskar, one of the principal bases of FDR's strength, was demobilized. Western-oriented and pro-government military officers wanted a smaller, more disciplined, and more trustworthy army under their leadership. They viewed TNI masjarakat as a less well-trained and -educated military organization that was strongly associated with communist organizations. The government wanted the Army to be led by professional officers who had undergone serious military training. Two pro-government military organizations, West Java Siliwangi Division and the Corps Polisi Militer (CPM, Military Police Corp), were officially acknowledged and given legal status. The demobilization of TNI masjarakat meant the influence of FDR in the government was getting weaker and this deepened the FDR's resentment against the government. From the FDR's perspective, rationalization was an attempt to destroy FDR's power.

The FDR was not the only group that opposed Hatta's rationalization. Among the military units that began to oppose the Hatta government was Division IV, better known as Divisi Senopati, which was stationed in Solo and placed under the command of Colonel Sutarto. Like FDR, Division IV was also disappointed with Hatta's rationalization and protested against the program on May 20, 1948. Hatta's decision to incorporate Division IV into Division I would place Colonel Sutarto in a reserve officer position. Sutarto and his soldiers ignored the instruction and began to reorganize their division. They transformed Division IV into a "battle-ready military unit" which gained support from the majority of Solo's population and FDR followers. They named the unit Divisi Pertempuran Panembahan Senopati (Battle-Division Duke Senopati). Sutarto was mysteriously murdered on July 2, 1948. Those who supported the FDR perceived the murder as part of the Hatta's rationalization program.

=== Delanggu strike ===
Disappointed by Hatta's rationalization, the FDR/PKI began to seek support from farmers and laborers by advocating land reform and organizing labor strikes. One of the FDR/PKI's principal bases of strength was SOBSI. Heavily dominated by communists, SOBSI organized several strikes to protest against the government. The most important strike took place in Solo. Plantation workers protested the government in response to the deteriorating condition of the economy after an economic blockade by the Dutch and the government's failure to eliminate feudalism and to stop the "speculative operation of the black market." The strike at the Delanggu cotton-growing area was organized by SABUPRI (the union of communist-oriented plantation workers), and around 20,000 workers went on strike for around 35 days. The government accused the FDR and SABUPRI leaders of endangering the Republic by organizing the strike. They responded to the accusation by saying that it was the government that endangered the Republic with its ineffective and incorrect economic policies. The FDR and SOBSI leaders wanted better implementation of the existing regulations and agrarian reforms from the government. The strike came to an end on 18 July 1948, when the government was willing to accept the workers' demand for two-meter-long textiles and rice to be given every month in addition to their salary.

=== Foreign relations of the Republic of Indonesia ===
The Madiun Affair should be placed in an international context in which two superpower countries played a role in the Indonesian government. Suripno was a young communist who became the representative of the Republic of Indonesia at the Congress of the World Federation of Democratic Youth in Prague in 1947. He was also given a mandate to contact the Soviet Union. In January 1948, he met a Soviet ambassador and discussed the future consular relationship between the Soviet Union and Indonesia. The Soviet government finally took the initiative by informing Suripno that the Consular Treaty had been rectified. Instead of accepting the treaty, Hatta's government decided to suspend the bilateral relationship. Suripno was then asked to return to Indonesia. On August 11, 1948, Suripno arrived at Jogjakarta with his "secretary", who turned out to be Musso, a senior Indonesian communist leader. When asked to give an official report to the Minister of Foreign Affairs Haji Agus Salim, Suripno praised the Soviets for their political stance, which had always acknowledged Indonesia as a sovereign state.

Hatta repeatedly refused the Consular Treaty because he was inclined to seek assistance from US power. On July 21, Sukarno, Hatta, the Minister for the Interior, the Minister for Information, and the US representative had a meeting at a hotel in Sarangan, Madiun. The Dutch and the US had the common goal of controlling the natural resources. On September 17, the Dutch Minister of Foreign Affairs stated that communist expansion in Indonesia was the main obstacle to the Western powers acquiring resources. The Dutch wanted the US to believe that Indonesia was the bulwark of communists. The US, however, decided to "include Hatta and his association in one international anti-communist front to be established in East and Southeast Asia" to challenge the Soviets. The Dutch failed to restore its control over Indonesia by bringing Indonesian leaders and American representatives into conflict.

=== Return of Musso and reorganization of the FDR ===
The return of Musso was the catalyst of the Madiun Affair. Sukarno officially invited Musso to his presidential palace in Jogjakarta. According to a journalist report, the meeting was very emotional. They embraced each other, and their eyes were filled with tears. Musso was Sukarno's political senior, and both were good friends when they resided in Surabaya.

Musso's return was a turning point of the FDR's political journey. During the party conference on August 26 and 27, 1948, it adopted a new political line and established a new body that consisted of left-wing parties. Members of this new political bureau were the FDR leaders (Maruto Darusman, Tan Ling Djie, Harjono, Setyadjit Soegondo, Djoko Sujono, Aidit, Wikana, Suripno, Amir Sjarifuddin, and Alimin), with Musso serving as the chairman. The reappointments were made on legitimate grounds by FDR/PKI's enemies to launch an "anti-PKI campaign." The government prepared strategies to "eliminate the Communists." One of the government's biggest accusations was that Musso promoted "the Republic's involvement in a Soviet-American conflict." The unification of those political forces was a fatal mistake.

=== Toward revolt ===
The FDR leaders made propaganda tours through Central and East Java. Its main purpose was to promote Musso's political ideas. Other PKI leaders remained in Jogjakarta to try to negotiate with PNI and Masjumi leaders to form a new cabinet, which would include FDR's representatives. The situation in the FDR was still chaotic even after the unification of several political forces. For instance, some members of the PKI and the Partai Sosialis in Bojonegoro opposed the decision made during the meeting on August 26 and 27, 1948. As a new structure, the FDR was technically not strong enough to confront any challenges from the outside.

There were small clashes involving pro-Hatta military groups on the one side and pro-FDR armed groups on the other. After the murder of Colonel Sutarto, political development in Solo became more intense. The coming of the Siliwangi Division, which was "loyal to government and anti-leftist," was also one of the causes of political instability in Solo which was the base of the Senopati Division. FDR's power started to diminish after several cases of murdering and kidnapping of "leftist officers." Kreutzer provides examples of kidnapping and murdering cases in weeks before the Madiun Affair: "On September 1, two members of Solo's PKI were kidnapped and later interrogated about the activities and organization of PKI in Solo. On the same day, however, members of Pesindo kidnapped some pro-government leaders. They were accused of kidnapping PKI members. Six days later, on September 7, almost all officers and several lower-ranking soldiers of Commander Yadau's Tentara Laut Republik Indonesia (TLRI, Republican Navy) were kidnapped and brought to a base of Siliwangi Division, a pro-government military unit. On September 9, Suadi, Sutarto's successor as Commander of the Senopati Division, obtained official approval from Indonesian Army Commander Sudirman to investigate the murder and kidnapping of people in Yogyakarta and Solo. But shortly after the investigation had started, several officers, who were given orders to interrogate the suspects, were kidnapped, too. On September 13 in Blitar, south of Malang, government units arrested several Pesindo members."

On September 16, Pesindo's headquarters was attacked. Solo, the second city of the Republic after Jogjakarta, became the scene of a complex conflict between the government and leftist groups during the first two weeks of September.

Solo was now dominated by the pro-government rightists, which made Madiun the FDR's last important stronghold since Yogyakarta and Solo were controlled by the Indonesian Republic, and Surabaya was under Dutch control. However, anti-communist groups and the pro-Hatta government had already been infiltrating Madiun since early September.

== Revolt ==
Movement of the FDP across Republican-held territories following the Renville Agreement.

Alarmed by what happened in Solo, local FDR leaders in Madiun began to feel uneasy and reported that to FDR leaders in Kediri, more than 35 miles east of Madiun. He received an order to disarm the agitators in Madiun to avoid possible bloodshed in the area. At 3 am on September 18, 1948, FDR began to seize the local government officers, telephone exchange, and army headquarters, with Sumarsono and Djoko Sujono as the leaders of the operation. The brief fighting ended with two loyal officers being killed and four wounded. Within hours, Madiun was under the FDR's control. Two FDR members, Setyadjit and Wikana, took over the civil administration and established the Pemerintah Front National Daerah Madiun (Government of the National Front of the Region of Madiun). Sumarsono then announced on the local radio, "From Madiun victory begins."

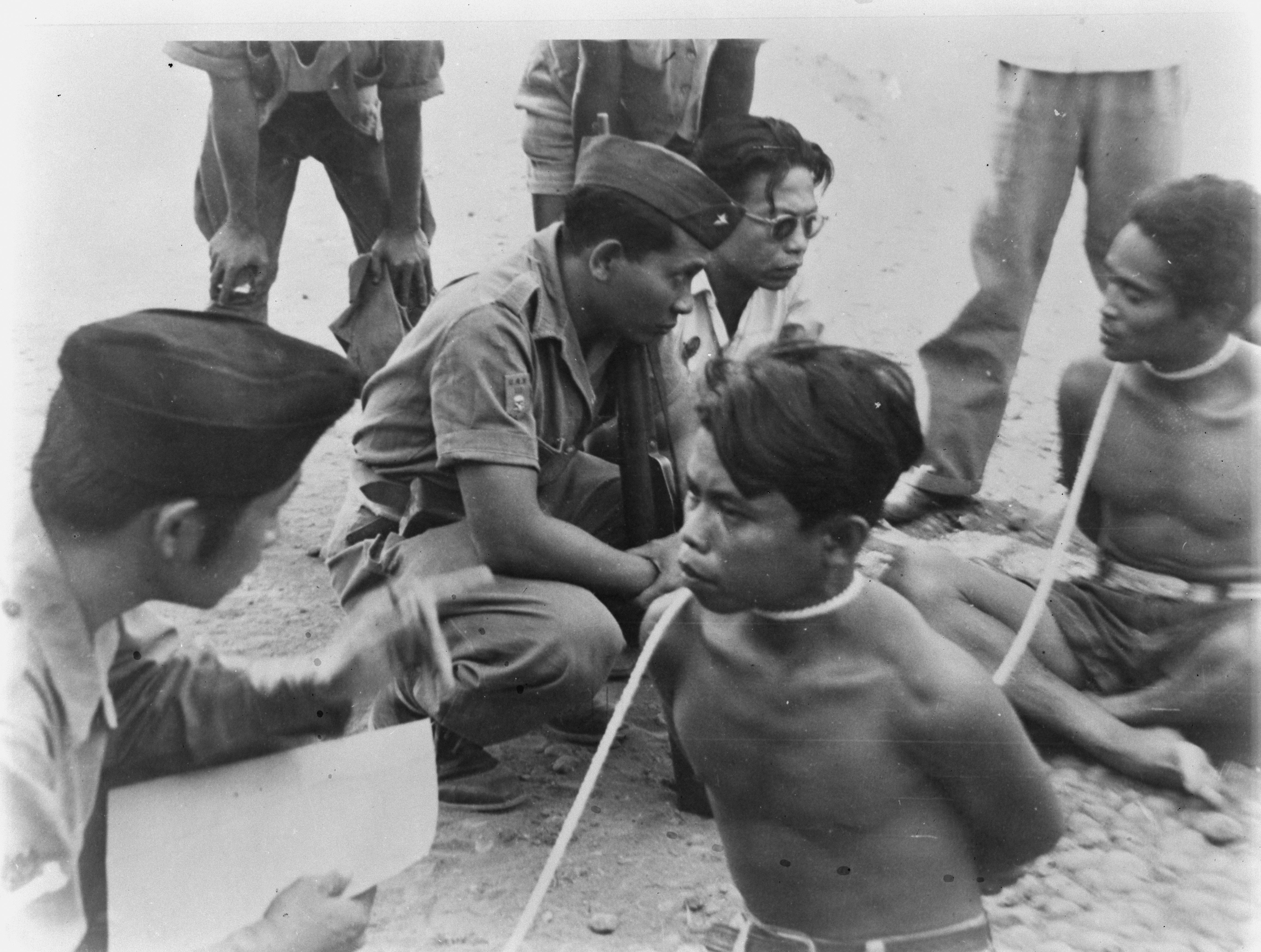
Two men with rope around their necks are handcuffed by TNI officers in September 1948 in Madiun, Indonesia

After hearing about what had happened on September 18, Musso and Sjarifuddin returned to Madiun. They immediately discussed the situation with Sumarsono, Setyadjit, and Wikana upon their arrival. At 10 pm on 19 September 1948, President Sukarno declared that the Madiun revolt was an attempt to overthrow the government of the Republic of Indonesia and that Musso had formed a Soviet government. He also stated that Indonesians had to choose between him and Hatta and Musso and his communist party. Sukarno's pronouncement was followed by an address by Sultan Hamengkubuwono IX, who had a very strong influence on Javanese society. In his speech, he asked people to help Sukarno and Hatta, and TP gave them a full mandate to crush the communist movement. At 11.30 pm the same day, Musso replied to Sukarno and declared war against the Indonesian government. He tried to convince Indonesian people that Sukarno and Hatta were the slaves of American Imperialism, "traitors," and "Romusha dealers." There was mounting tension between the Sukarno-Hatta and FDR leaders.

Some FDR leaders decided to be independent from Musso. On September 20, 1948, they declared their willingness to reconcile with the Indonesian government. In the evening, Colonel Djoko Sujono, Military Commandant in the Madiun, broadcasts over the radio that what happened in Madiun was not a coup but an attempt to correct the government's policy, which "led the revolution in a different direction." He was followed by Sumarsono, the original leader of the revolt, who made a similar public announcement that the Madiun event was not a coup but an attempt to correct the political aims of Hatta's government. In his attempt to convince the government, Amir Sjarifuddin stated on September 23 that FDR's constitution was that of the Republic of Indonesia, its flag remained red and white, and its national anthem was still Indonesia Raya.

== Aftermath ==
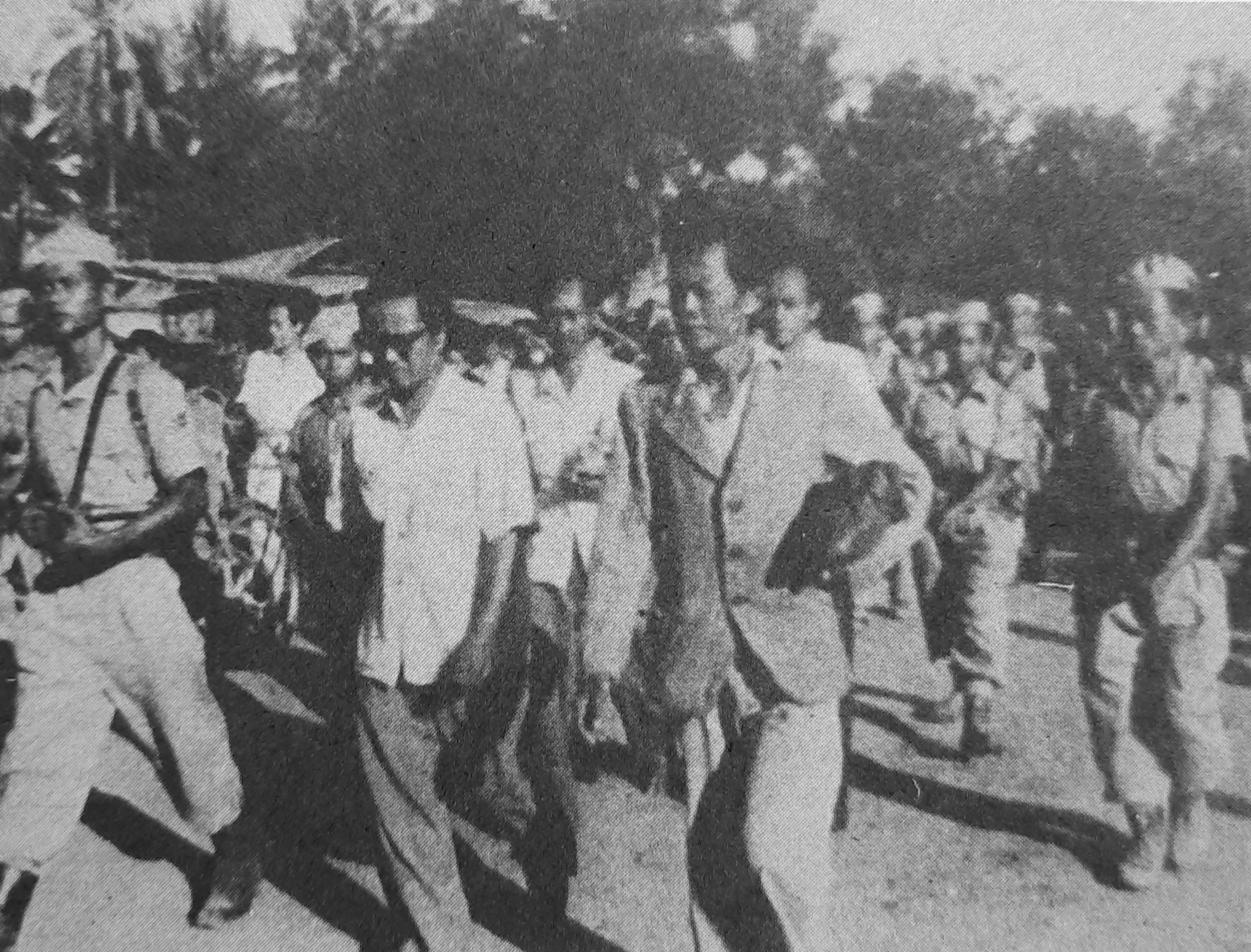
Former PM Amir Sjarifuddin (wearing glasses) was among those captured and executed for their parts in the rebellion.

The Indonesian government seemed to ignore some FDR leaders' attempt to end the conflict. They used the small revolt to "crack down the Indonesian left." The military operation was led by Colonel Gatot Soebroto and Nasution, and they promised to settle the mess within two weeks. Hatta insisted to curb the rebellion and seize Madiun as soon as possible before the Dutch started to intervene. The government started the anti-Communist purge from Jogjakarta and Solo. On September 30, the government sent Lieutenant Colonel Sadikin, of the Siliwangi Division brigade, to mobilize his troops and to control Madiun. To avoid conflicts with the Indonesian Armed Forces, FDR/PKI leaders began to retreat to mountainous areas. Under the command of Sjarifuddin, they fled Madiun and headed to the small village of Kandangan, where they could find munitions and arms (a store built up when Sjarifuddin was the Prime Minister and Minister of Defense). To their surprise, the village was already occupied by the battalion of the Sungkono Division led by Major Sabarudin.

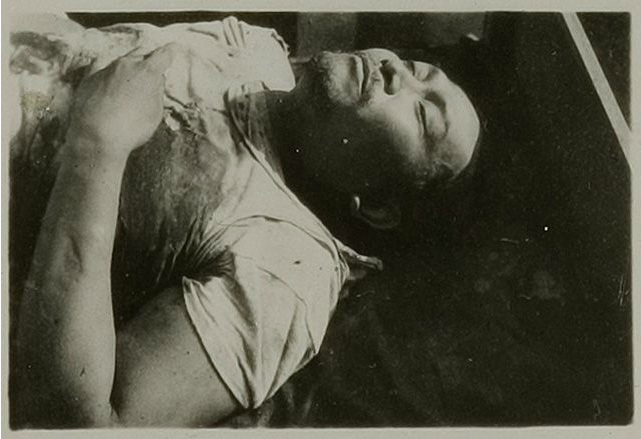
The body of Musso after being shot while fleeing on October 31, 1948, in Ponorogo, East Java

On October 28, the government arrested 1,500 men of the last rebel military unit. Musso was shot dead three days later when he hid in a restroom and refused to surrender. His body was brought to Ponorogo, set on display for public view, and set ablaze. A month later, on November 29, Djoko Sujono and Maruto Darusman were arrested. Sjarifuddin faced the same fate when he was captured on 4 December. Three days later, on December 7, 1948, "TNI headquarters announced the final extermination of the rebellion and stated that approximately 35,000 people, mostly troops, had been arrested. On December 19, Sjarifuddin, Maruto Darusman, Djoko Sujono, Suripno and other FDR leaders were executed. Estimated casualties were 24,000 in total (8,000 in Madiun, 4,000 in Cepu and 12,000 in Ponorogo, as the affair affected neighbouring areas).

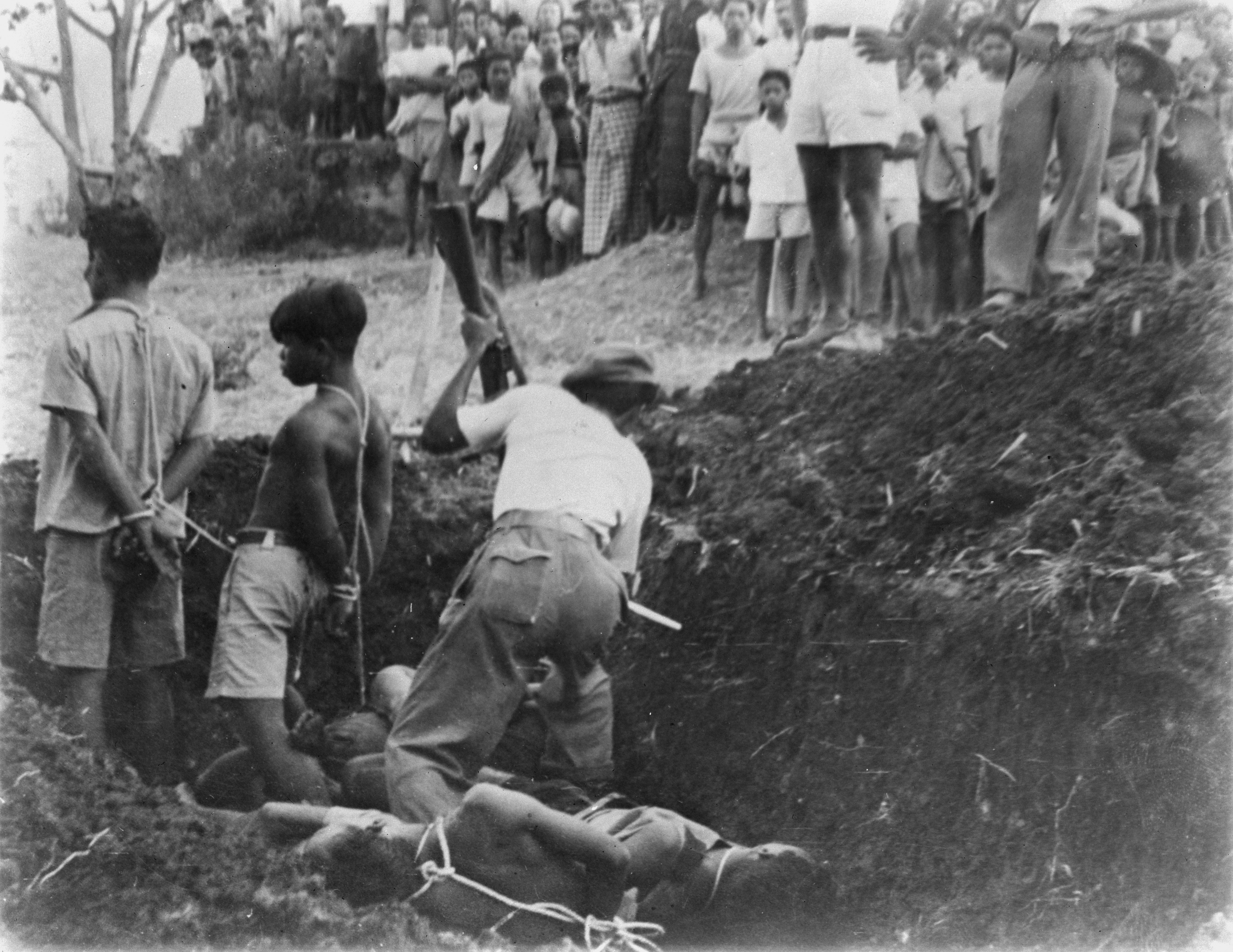
One of moment public execution during aftermath of Madiun Affair

Most of FDR leaders were detained and executed, Sumarsono managed to escape. He fled Madiun and headed north into Dutch territory. He was finally arrested by Dutch troops because of his illegal possession of gold and treasury. Although initially the Dutch authorities were suspicious of his involvement in the Madiun Affair, he managed to deceive them with a false identity. He was released on July 30, 1949, but was arrested again on October 29 for his identity fraud case. The Dutch kept investigating and on November 11 revealed Sumarsono's identity and his involvement in the Madiun Affair. The Dutch authorities decided to execute him in New Guinea. Before that happened, however, Sumarsono escaped from prison on December 13. He fled to North Sumatera and lived there as a teacher. He was arrested again during the anti-communist campaign launched by the Indonesian government under Suharto in 1965.

== See also ==
- 30 September Movement
- Indonesian killings of 1965–66

== Notes ==
=== References ===
- Kahin, George (1970). Nationalism and Revolution in Indonesia. Cornell University Press. ISBN 0-8014-9108-8.
- Kreutzer, Rudi (1981). The Madiun Affair: Hatta's Betrayal of Indonesia's First Revolution. James Cook University. ISBN 0-86443-027-2.
- Pinardi (1966). Peristiwa Coup Berdarah P.K.I. September 1948 di Madiun. Inkopak-Hazera.
- Poeze, Harry A. (2009). "The Cold War in Indonesia, 1948". Journal of Southeast Asian Studies. 40 (Special Issue 3: Asian Cold War Symposium): 497–517. doi:10.1017/S002246340999004X. S2CID 145172141.
- Soe, Hok Gie (1997). Orang-Orang di Persimpangan Kiri Jalan. Yayasan Bentang Budaya.
- Sugiyama, Akiko (October 2011). "Remembering and forgetting Indonesia's Madiun Affair: personal narratives, political transitions, and historiography, 1948–2008". Indonesia. 92 (92): 19–42. doi:10.5728/indonesia.92.0019. hdl:1813/54557. JSTOR 10.5728/indonesia.92.0019. On Jstor.
