= Central All-Indonesian Workers Organization =

Former trade union federation in Indonesia

SOBSI
- Founded: November 1946
- Dissolved: 1966
- Location: Indonesia
- Members: 2,732,909 (1960)
- Key people: Harjono, Setiadjit, Njono, Munir
- Affiliations: WFTU

The Central All-Indonesian Workers Organization (Indonesian: Sentral Organisasi Buruh Seluruh Indonesia, SOBSI) was the largest trade union federation in Indonesia. Founded during the period of the country's independence in the late 1940s, the federation grew rapidly in the 1950s. It was initially formed with loose connections to the Communist Party of Indonesia (PKI) and with members from other parties, but over time, the PKI became dominant in the organisation. With the introduction of President Sukarno's guided democracy in the late 1950s, SOBSI was formally recognised and given a place in the national decision-making structures. In the 1960s, SOBSI came into conflict with the Army, whose officers controlled the country's state enterprises. After the 1965 coup that subsequently produced Suharto's New Order regime, SOBSI was declared illegal, its members killed and imprisoned and most of the leadership executed.

== History ==
=== Founding ===
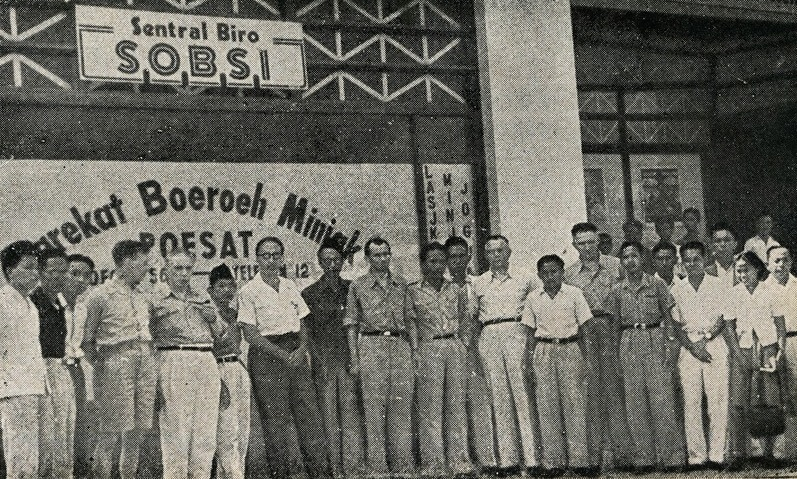
SOBSI congress in Malang, 1947

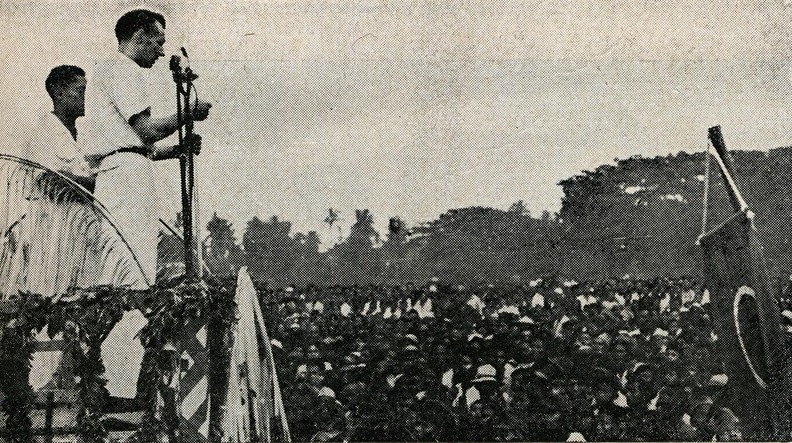
Dutch trade unionist Blokzijl addressing a meeting at the time of the 1947 congress

SOBSI was founded in Jakarta on November 29, 1946, the first trade union federation to emerge after the Second World War. The workers' movement was subsequently reorganized, largely into the Central All-Indonesian Workers Organization (SOBSI), which called for the unity of workers and the establishment of a socialist society. After the suppression of the Madiun Affair, many of SOBSI's leaders went underground, into exile, were imprisoned or killed. From May 1948, the SOBSI was reorganized and brought under the influence of the Communist Party. Between 1950 and 1952, the SOBSI attempted to mobilize militant actions for higher wages, increased social security and better workplace conditions, launching a nationwide strike that forced the government to increase the minimum wage, block plans for layoffs and institute a non-contributory pension scheme. However, this was followed by the Natsir Cabinet outlawing strikes in essential industries, forcing the SOBSI to turn to sabotage. After another government crackdown, the Communist Party forced the SOBSI to moderate its policies, taking a conciliatory line towards the capitalist class.

With the introduction of Guided Democracy, the SOBSI became the institutionalized representative of labor within the Sukarno government. It oversaw nationalization efforts, continuing the running of companies under state control. These nationalizations drove SOBSI into a conflict with the armed forces, fighting for influence over the state controlled companies. This conflict culminated in the Indonesian mass killings of 1965–66, in which the army massacred left-wing activists, feminists and ethnic and religious minorities, killing hundreds of thousands. The military leader Suharto rose to power, instituting a right-wing military dictatorship known as the New Order. The SOBSI was subsequently declared illegal by the new regime and many of its members and leaders were killed.

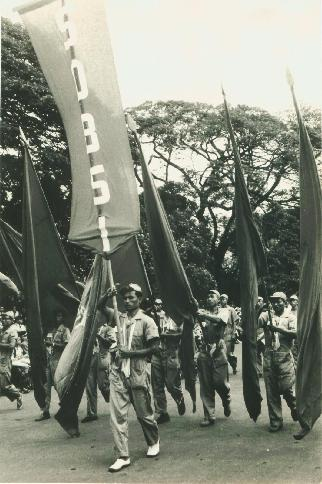
A demonstration by the Central All-Indonesian Workers Organization.

SOBSI held its first national congress in Malang on May 16–18, 1947. A constitution of the organization was adopted, which called for workers to unite and struggle for the creation of a socialist society. SOBSI was organized along industrial lines, but craft unions enjoyed equality within the organization. Amongst the sectors represented in SOBSI at the time of its foundation were teachers, printers, pawnshop employees, longshoremen, teamsters, miners, seamen, gas and electricity, oil workers, estate workers and railroad workers.

Around 600-800 delegates participated in the Malang congress. Most of them came from Java. One delegate represented the Indonesian Democratic Union from West Timor. Foreign guests at the Malang congress included two Australians, Ted Roach and Mike Healy, and two Dutch trade unionists, Blokzijl (of Eenheids Vakcentrale) and RKN Vijlbrief. J.G. Suurhof (of Nederlands Verbond van Vakvereenigingen) and Evert Kupers, in his capacity as the vice-chairperson of World Federation of Trade Union, were attending the congress as well. Rajkni Tomovic (Yugoslavia), Jean Lautissier (France) and Olga Tchetchekina (Russia) of the WFTU were also present.

The top leadership of the new organization consisted of the chairman Harjono, the vice chairman Setiadjit (chairman of the Labour Party of Indonesia and second Deputy Prime Minister in the Sjarifuddin cabinet) and general secretary Njono.

The Malang congress received significant attention from the Dutch press, both in the Netherlands and in Batavia. The Dutch press argued that the SOBSI congress indicated a strong communist influence in the Indonesian labour movement.

After the formation of SOBSI, the GSBI trade union centre dissolved itself and its member unions joined SOBSI. SOBSI became a member of the Sajap Kiri coalition of left-wing groups. After Sajap Kiri was superseded by the short-lived People's Democratic Front, SOBSI joined the new front.

=== Madiun Affair ===
Until the Madiun Affair, a communist uprising in September 1948, SOBSI was the sole relevant trade union force in the country. When the uprising broke out in the town of Madiun, several of the communist SOBSI leaders went underground. Many SOBSI leaders were killed or went into exile when the revolt was subsequently crushed. The SOBSI chairman Harjono and Sarbupri (estate workers union, the largest SOBSI union) chairman Maruto Darusman were imprisoned after the uprising and were killed by the Indonesian army in December 1948, as Dutch troops approached the prison site. SOBSI operations were shut down by the army. Nineteen out of 34 affiliated unions withdrew from SOBSI in protest against the role played by communist leaders in the rebellion. SOBSI was however not formally outlawed, as the organization as such had not supported the uprising.

=== Re-establishment ===
Trade unions temporarily stopped to function during the Dutch attack in December 1948. From May 1948 work began to reorganize SOBSI. SOBSI was re-established in September 1949. The new leadership was clearly dominated by the Communist Party. The acting chairman of SOBSI, Asrarudin, left the organization in protest against the communist dominance. In November 1949, SOBSI launched a campaign against the Round Table Conference agreement. The organization also called for a Lebaran festival bonus to be instituted. These demands became widely popular, and the organization rapidly expanded its base. By mid-1950 SOBSI had twenty-five vertical unions as well as many local affiliated unions. It claimed a membership of 2.5 million (although that figure was questioned by outsiders). In November 1950 Njono, then 28 years old, returned from a prolonged study trip to China and overtook the leadership of SOBSI as its chairman.

Notably, whilst no longer holding monopoly over the trade union sector, SOBSI was far better organized and financed than its rivals. Moreover, the SOBSI leadership had more experience than that of other unions. Non-SOBSI unions tended to have either a defensive approach towards SOBSI or merely mimicking SOBSI discourse.

=== Militant period ===
Between 1950 and early 1952, SOBSI attempted to mobilize militant actions, raising issues such as wages, social security and workplace conditions. SOBSI launched a wave of strikes in late 1950. In September 1950 Sarbupri launched a nationwide strike, which paralyzed most estates. The Sarbupri strike resulted in the first major victory for SOBSI, having forced the government to significantly increase the estate workers' minimum wage. Strikes by oil workers in the same year blocked plans for lay-offs and forces the government to institute a non-contributory pension scheme instead. In response to the SOBSI strike wave several regional commanders of the army outlawed strikes in essential industries. The policy was by the Natsir cabinet in February 1951. Following the issue of the ban, SOBSI turned to sporadic strikes and sabotage actions (such as destroying cargo at ports or crops at plantations).

In September 1951 an emergency law substituted the ban on strikes in vital industries, which stipulated mandatory arbitration (which SOBSI initially opposed) In August 1951 around 3,000 SOBSI activists and leaders were imprisoned in a government crackdown on opposition, in the wake of speculations about a possible leftist coup d'état. However, relatively few SOBSI branches and unions mobilized protests against the arrests.

=== National United Front line ===
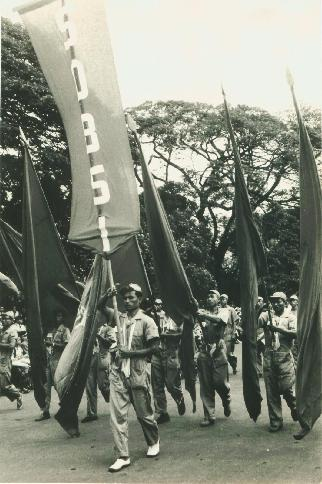
SOBSI manifestation

On March 1, 1952, the PKI Central Committee adopted a resolution labelling the activities of SOBSI as 'sectarian'. The PKI instructed SOBSI to align with the national united front line of the party; that SOBSI should seek cooperation with non-communist trade unions and mobilize the broadest section of workers.

SOBSI held a national conference between September 27 and October 12, 1952, which ratified the shift to the national united front line. The meeting adopted a new constitution for SOBSI, void of any mention of "socialism", "people's democracy", "class struggle" and "democratic centralism". Under the new orientation SOBSI sought to build alliances with the peasantry and non-comprador bourgeoisie for popular democratic revolution and to mobilize resistance against imperialism. From this point onwards, SOBSI was cautious of entering into direct conflicts with the government and national capitalists. In direct contradiction to its earlier line, SOBSI even pledged to help national capitalists and to increase productivity in industries. However, the Communist Party eventually intervened against the notion of productivity-increase at its 1956 congress. SOBSI began forming coordination committees with other unions in different sectors. In 1953 SOBSI, KBKI and four other trade union centres formed a joint May Day committee. From that point onwards, May Day rallies were held jointly.

However, in spite of the more moderate line of SOBSI its affiliated union remained more active in defense of the interests of their members than the rival unions. In July 1952 the sugar workers union SBG held a major strike demanding Lebaran bonus. In September 1953 a Sarbupri strike forced the government to increase wages for estate workers by 30%.

SOBSI held its second national congress in January 1955. At this point, the organization had 128 branch offices and claimed a membership of 2,661,970. The congress ratified the new constitution adopted in 1952. During 1955 SOBSI was able to achieve the implementation of some of its long-running demands, such as introduction of Lebaran bonus, new wage scale for workers and employees in the public sector and distribution of cheap essential goods in some enterprises.

On March 18, 1957 SOBSI organized a 24-hour general strike in south Sumatra, protest against the local take-over of power by a regional army commander. On the following day, SOBSI issued a warning to Suwirjo that SOBSI would organize a nationwide general strike if he formed a government cabinet with Masjumi and excluding PKI.

=== Guided Democracy ===
With the introduction of Guided Democracy, President Sukarno increasingly came to rely on SOBSI as the representative of labour. SOBSI was awarded status as a 'functional group' with representation at different levels. When Sukarno appointed a 45-member National Council on July 12, 1957, with the task of assisting the cabinet, SOBSI was awarded one seat (represented by Munir).

In July 1957, the SOBSI headquarters were attacked with grenades.

In September 1957 a reorganization took place inside SOBSI. The vertical and local unions were reorganized into 31 national unions. The organization had eight regional offices and 150 branches by this point.

SOBSI led struggles, both in the streets and inside parliament, demanding nationalizations of Dutch enterprises. When the Indonesian government nationalized Dutch companies in December 1957, SOBSI declared its willingness to keep the companies running. In the wake of the nationalizations, inter-island shipping services were disrupted and thousands of seamen and harbour workers were left unemployed. SOBSI demanded that government pay wages to these groups, a demand conceded to by the government as it accepted to pay wages to the unemployed seamen and harbour workers until mid-1959.

SOBSI representatives were included in the National Council of the National Front (represented by Munir from August 1960), the People's Consultative Assembly and provincial and local councils, appointed by Sukarno in July 1959. Moreover, on August 15, 1959 SOBSI obtained one seat in the National Advisory Council and the National Planning Council. Some eight SOBSI representatives were included in the appointed parliament formed in June 1960.

SOBSI held its third national congress in September–October 1960. In November 1960 the organization had 165 branches and five preparatory branches. At the time the organization claimed a membership of 2,732,909. The SOBSI headquarters had around 50 full-time staff members.

=== Conflict with the army ===
Eventually, the nationalizations resulted in increased antagonism between SOBSI and the army. In many instances Dutch-owned properties had been seized by SOBSI unions, but were later taken over by the military. Many high-ranking officers were included in the management boards of nationalized companies, and were hostile to the SOBSI influence in the state enterprises. Most of the rivals of SOBSI in the labour movement aligned with the army in challenging SOBSI dominance. Moreover, an army-backed trade union centre, SOKSI, was formed in 1961, a move SOBSI vehemently protested against.

The army and the Minister of Labour had plans of creating a sole trade union federation in the country, as a way of disarming SOBSI. SOBSI was however able to defeat the plan. In response to the attacks on SOBSI by army elements in state enterprises, PKI began denouncing them as 'bureaucratic capitalists'. SOBSI stepped up its militant opposition against the 'bureaucratic capitalists' in 1960, in response to the abolishing of various colonial-era benefits (such as the Lebaran bonus) in state enterprises.

=== Three-year plan ===
On January 1, 1961 SOBSI declared an ambitious three-year plan of action on organizing, education and culture. In particular SOBSI sought to strengthen its presence in agricultural and transport sectors. The campaign bore fruit, and the organization claimed to have gained half a million members in two years. As of late 1962, SOBSI claimed to have 3,277,032 members. In East Java alone, SOBSI claimed a membership exceeding 510,000. During this period 5,278 teachers had been trained to carry out base-level courses, 30,703 SOBSI activists had passed through training courses. During 1962, 19,964 workers completed literacy classes organized by SOBSI. 145 SOBSI sports teams and eleven revolutionary choirs were formed. SOBSI gathered around half of the unionized workers in the country at the time.

In December 1963 the United States decided to expand the area of operations of its Seventh Fleet to the Indian Ocean. PKI and SOBSI saw this move as a threat to Indonesia, and SOBSI demanded the nationalization of American companies in Indonesia as a retaliation.

Towards the mid-1960s, SOBSI began to diverge from the party line. The organization became increasingly dissatisfied with the policy of putting national interests ahead of class interests. The PKI leader Aidit condemned these tendencies as 'trade unionism'.

Njono left his post as SOBSI chairman in September 1964, as he was assigned to lead the Greater Jakarta organization of PKI.

SOBSI held its fourth national congress in 1965.

=== Suppression ===
Following the 1965 military coup d'état, the army wiped out SOBSI and its 62 affiliated unions. On October 10, the SOBSI office in Surabaya was taken over by the army. In West Kalimantan, the SOBSI office was ransacked by anti-communist protestors. At Solo and other cities in Central Java railway workers went on strike to prevent the arrival of RPKAD shock troops. The strike was broken only after the army used machine guns against the workers. There were claims by SOBSI envoys abroad that other strikes were being organized in Sumatra and North Sulawesi.

On November 3, 1965 the activities of SOBSI were declared 'frozen' by the government.

Njono was sentenced to death in February 1966. After March 1966, repression against SOBSI was stepped up. Many union members were killed or imprisoned, many of them on the island Buru. Prior to the crack-down, U.S.-trained trade unionists had gathered information about SOBSI members and sympathizers. Once the massacres and killings began, these lists were used to identify SOBSI followers. The organization was banned.

With the crushing of SOBSI, decades of tradition of Indonesian radical labour organizing died out. Under the New Order regime, government discourse would continue to argue that independent labour organizing and communism was intimately linked.

== Relations with the Communist Party ==
Albeit always nominally independent, SOBSI had close links with the Communist Party. Communist Party cadres had worked within SOBSI since the time of its foundation. Other groups influential inside SOBSI during its first years were the Socialist Party of Amir Sjarifuddin and the Labour Party of Indonesia. By 1951, the Communist Party loosely controlled the national leadership of SOBSI. In response to the PKI influence over SOBSI, non-communist sectors withdrew from the organization and established different trade union organizations of their own. In March 1952 the Communist Party launched a massive recruitment campaign amongst the SOBSI ranks, and large numbers of SOBSI members became party members. But the SOBSI leadership was not exclusively communist, the SOBSI leader Ahem Erningpradja was a member of the leadership of the Indonesian Nationalist Party.

Njono, the chairman of SOBSI, became a candidate member of the PKI Politburo at the 1956 party congress. Likewise, the nine-member central board of SOBSI elected consisted of eight parliamentarians elected on the Communist Party list (six declared Communist Party members whilst the other two were supposedly independents).

SOBSI played an active and important role in the electoral campaigns of the Communist Party, both ahead of the two national elections held 1955 and the local elections held 1957–1958. Local level SOBSI electoral action committees were formed throughout the country. SOBSI mobilized workers to participate in PKI election meetings.

== International cooperation ==
At the Malang congress in 1947, SOBSI decided to affiliate itself to the World Federation of Trade Unions. Two SOBSI delegates, Harjono and Oei Gee Hwat, participated in a WFTU meeting in Prague in June 1947, at which SOBSI was accepted as a member of the international organization.

As part of the new national united front line adopted in 1952, SOBSI began organizing frequent joint delegations with other Indonesian unions to countries of the Socialist Bloc.

Njono served as vice chairman of WFTU.

== Women's Bureau ==
SOBSI had a separate Women's Bureau, whose membership overlapped that of Gerwani (a women's movement connected to PKI). The SOBSI Women's Bureau and Gerwani led joint campaigns, demanding implementation of women's rights guaranteed by the 1951 Labour Law (such as rights to maternity and menstruation leave and breastfeeding breaks at the workplace).

== Publications ==
SOBSI issued various publications. The main publication of SOBSI was Bendera Buruh ('Workers Flag'). Bendera Buruh had been launched in March 1956, substituting the semi-monthly Buletin SOBSI (which had reached a circulation of 10,000). SOBSI also issued an English-language monthly publication called Indonesian Trade Union News.

SOBSI publications were, however, largely unprofitable. As of 1957, Bendera Buruh sales only compensated around 40% of its production costs. As of May 1957, circulation of Bendera Buruh stood at a meagre 5,500. In 1958 there was a decision that Bendera Buruh ought to be distributed to every base-level union organization of SOBSI, but this was never implemented fully. Bendera Buruh was closed down in October 1960.

== Unions affiliated to SOBSI ==
- Sarbupri (estate workers)
- Sarbuksi (forest workers)
- SEBDA (local government employees)
- PERBUM (oil workers)
- SBTI/SOBSI (miners)
- SBKA (railways)
- SBPP (sailors)
- SBKB (transport workers)
- SBPU (construction and general workers)
- SEPDA (municipal employees)
- SBG (sugar plantation workers)
- Sarbufis (film & theatre workers)
- Serbaud (aviation)
- SBIM (metal workers)
- SB Kependjaraan (prison employees)
- Serbuni (Unilever workers)
