= Communist Party of Indonesia =

Political party in Indonesia (1914–1966)

Communist Party of Indonesia Partai Komunis Indonesia
- Abbreviation: PKI
- Founder: Henk Sneevliet, Semaun
- Founded: 23 May 1914; 112 years ago (Note: As the Indies Social Democratic Association; 23 May 1920; 106 years ago (as the Communist Union of the Indies).)
- Banned: 5 July 1966; 60 years ago
- Headquarters: Jakarta
- Newspaper: Harian Rakjat
- Student wing: Consentrasi Gerakan Mahasiswa Indonesia
- Youth wing: People's Youth
- Women's wing: Gerwani
- Labour wing: Central All-Indonesian Workers Organization
- Peasant wing: Peasants Front of Indonesia
- Membership (1960): 3,000,000–4,000,000
- Ideology: Communism; Marxism–Leninism; Maoism
- Political position: Far-left
- National affiliation: People's Democratic Front (1948)
- International affiliation: Comintern (until 1943)
- Colours: Red
- Slogan: Para Buruh Seluruh Dunia, Bersatulah! (Workers of the world, unite!)
- Anthem: Pujaan Kepada Partai Internasionale (The Internationale)

Election symbol
- Hammer and sickle

Party flag

The Communist Party of Indonesia (Indonesian: Partai Komunis Indonesia, Indonesian pronunciation: ['partaɪ koˈmunɪs indo'nesija], PKI, [ˈpekai̯]) was a Marxist-Leninist and Maoist communist party in the Dutch East Indies and later Indonesia. It was founded in 1914 as the Indies Social Democratic Association, became the Communist Union of the Indies in 1920, and adopted the name PKI in 1924. The Dutch colonial government banned the party after failed uprisings in 1926 and 1927, but it re-emerged during the Indonesian National Revolution after the Japanese surrender in 1945.

Under D. N. Aidit, the PKI grew rapidly during the 1950s. It finished fourth in the 1955 Indonesian legislative election, receiving 16.35% of the vote and winning 39 out of 257 seats. By the mid-1960s, it had about three million members and was supported by large labour, peasant, youth, women's, and cultural organizations. The party supported President Sukarno's system of Guided Democracy and became the communist element in his Nasakom political formula. At its height, it was one of the largest communist parties outside China and the Soviet Union.

After the 30 September Movement in 1965, in which six senior army generals were killed, the army accused the PKI of organizing an attempted coup. Some PKI leaders and sympathizers were involved in the movement, but the extent of the party's responsibility remains disputed. Under General Suharto, the army and allied groups carried out a nationwide anti-communist purge in which at least 500,000 people are estimated to have been killed, including PKI members, alleged sympathizers, and others. The party's leadership and organization were destroyed, and the PKI was banned in 1966.

== History ==
=== Forerunners ===
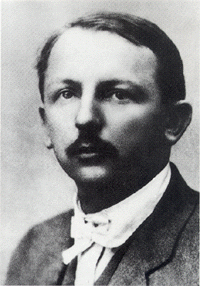
Henk Sneevliet

The Indies Social Democratic Association (Dutch: Indische Sociaal-Democratische Vereeniging, ISDV) was founded in 1914 by Dutch socialist Henk Sneevliet and fellow Indies socialist. The 85-member ISDV was a merger of the two Dutch socialist parties (the SDAP and the Socialist Party of the Netherlands), which would become the Communist Party of the Netherlands under Dutch East Indies leadership. The Dutch members of the ISDV introduced communist ideas to educated Indonesians looking for ways to oppose colonial rule.

The ISDV began a Dutch-language publication, Het Vrije Woord (The Free Word, edited by Adolf Baars), in October 1915. It did not demand independence when the ISDV was formed. At this point, the association had about 100 members; only three were Indonesians, and it rapidly took a radically anti-capitalist direction. When Sneevliet moved the ISDV's headquarters from Surabaya to Semarang, the ISDV began attracting many Indonesians from like-minded movements which had been growing throughout the Dutch Indies since 1900. The ISDV became increasingly incompatible with the SDAP leadership in the Netherlands, who distanced themselves from the association and began to equate them with Volksraad (People's Council). A reformist faction of the ISDV broke away and formed the Indies Social Democratic Party in 1917. The ISDV began Soeara Merdeka (The Voice of Freedom), its first Indonesian-language publication, that year.

After the Russian Revolution of 1917, Sneevliet's radicalism gained enough support amongst both the Indonesian population and Dutch soldiers and especially sailors that the Dutch authorities got nervous. Sneevliet was therefore forced to leave the Dutch East Indies in 1918. ISDV was repressed by the Dutch colonial authorities.

Around the same time, the ISDV and communist sympathizers began infiltrating other political groups in the East Indies in a tactic known as the "block within" strategy. The most apparent effect was the infiltration of a nationalist-religious organization Sarekat Islam (Islamic Union) which advocated a Pan-Islamist stance and freedom from colonial rule. Many members including Semaun and Darsono were successfully influenced by radical leftist ideas. As a result, communist thoughts and ISDV agents were successfully planted in the largest Islamic organization in Indonesia. After the involuntary departure of several Dutch cadres, combined with the infiltration operations, the membership shifted from majority-Dutch to majority-Indonesian.

=== Establishment ===
At its 23 May 1920 congress in Semarang, the ISDV changed its name to Perserikatan Komunis di Hindia (PKH; the Communist Union of the Indies). Semaun became party chairman, and Darsono the vice-chairman. Its highest committee members were predominantly Dutch.

During this time, communist sympathizers were still considered part of Sarekat Islam itself. In the period leading up to the Sarekat Islam's sixth congress in 1921, members affiliated with the central branch in Batavia decided to attempt to purge the organization of its communist members. Agus Salim, the organization's secretary, introduced a motion banning Sarekat Islam members from dual membership in other parties. The motion passed despite opposition from Tan Malaka and Semaun, forcing the communists to change tactics. The Dutch colonial authorities introduced more restrictions on political activity and Sarekat Islam decided to focus on religious matters, leaving the communists as the only active extremist organization.

In 1922, whilst Semaun was attending Far Eastern Labour Conference in Moscow, Tan Malaka tried to turn a strike by government pawnshop workers into a national strike by all Indonesian labor unions. The plot failed and Malaka was arrested, given a choice between internal or external exile; he chose the latter and left for the Soviet Union. In May, Semaun returned after seven months in the Soviet Union and began to organize the labor unions into a single organization. In September, the Union of Indonesian Labour Organizations (Persatuan Vakbonded Hindia) was formed.

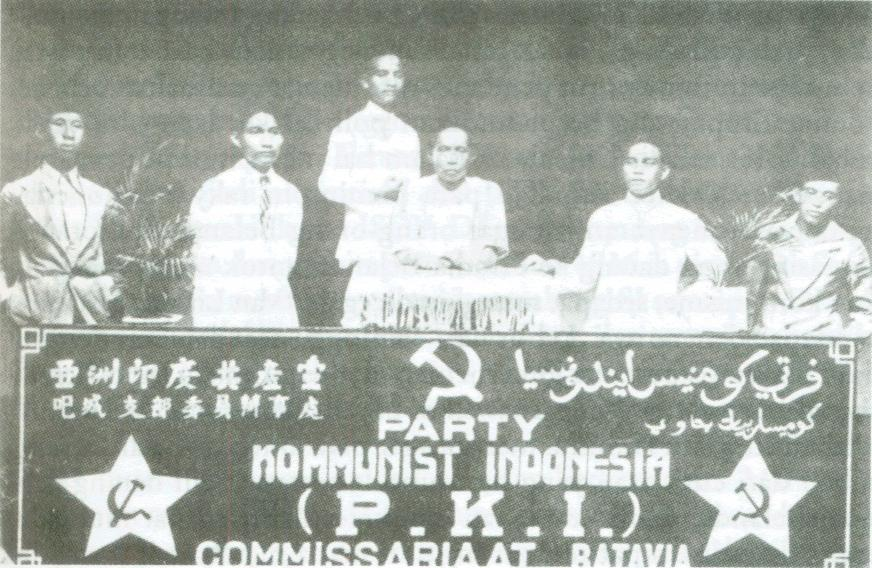
PKI meeting in Batavia (now Jakarta), 1925

At the Fifth Comintern Congress in 1924, it was emphasized that "the top priority of communist parties is to gain control of trades unions"; there could be no successful revolution without this. The PKH began to concentrate on unions, decided to improve discipline, and demanded the establishment of a Soviet Republic of Indonesia. The party name was changed again that year, to Partai Komunis Indonesia (PKI, Communist Party of Indonesia).

=== 1926–27 revolts ===
Main article: 1926 communist uprising in Java

==== Planning ====
In a May 1925 plenary session, the Comintern executive committee ordered the Indonesian communists to form an anti-imperialist coalition with non-communist, nationalist organizations; extremist elements led by Alimin and Musso called for a revolution to overthrow the Dutch colonial government. At a conference in Prambanan, Central Java, communist-controlled trade unions decided that the revolution would start with a strike by railroad workers which would then trigger a general strike; after that, the PKI would replace the colonial government.

The planned revolution would begin in Padang, but a government-security clampdown at the beginning of 1926 which ended the right to assembly and led to the arrest of PKI members forced the party to go deeper underground. Dissention among PKI leaders about the timing and course of the revolution resulted in poor planning. Tan Malaka, the Comintern's agent for Southeast Asia and Australia, did not agree with the plot (partly because he believed that the PKI had insufficient mass support). As a result of these divisions, the revolution was postponed in June 1926.

==== Revolt ====
However, a limited revolt in Batavia (as Jakarta was then known) began on 12 November; similar revolts took place in Padang, Bantam and Surabaya. The Batavia revolt was crushed in a day or two, and the others were quashed in a few weeks.

==== Aftermath ====
As a result of the failed revolution, 13,000 people were arrested, 4,500 imprisoned, 1,308 interned, and 823 exiled to the Boven-Digoel camp in the Digul region of Western New Guinea; several people died in captivity. Many non-communist political activists were also targeted by colonial authorities under the pretext of suppressing the communist rebellion, and the party was outlawed by the Dutch East Indies government in 1927. The PKI went underground, and Dutch (and, later, Japanese) surveillance ensured that it was never a disciplined or coherent organisation for the remainder of the pre-war period.

During the initial period of illegality, with much of its leadership imprisoned, the PKI kept a somewhat lower profile. Although PKI leader Musso returned from his Moscow exile in 1935 to reorganize the underground (or "illegal") PKI, his stay in Indonesia was brief, and the leadership of that illegal branch (such as Djokosoedjono) were soon arrested and exiled to Boven-Digoel. Remnants of the party worked on a variety of fronts, such as Gerindo and trade unions. It began working amongst Indonesian students in the Netherlands within the nationalist organization Perhimpunan Indonesia, which the party would soon control.

=== Resurgence ===
==== National revolution ====
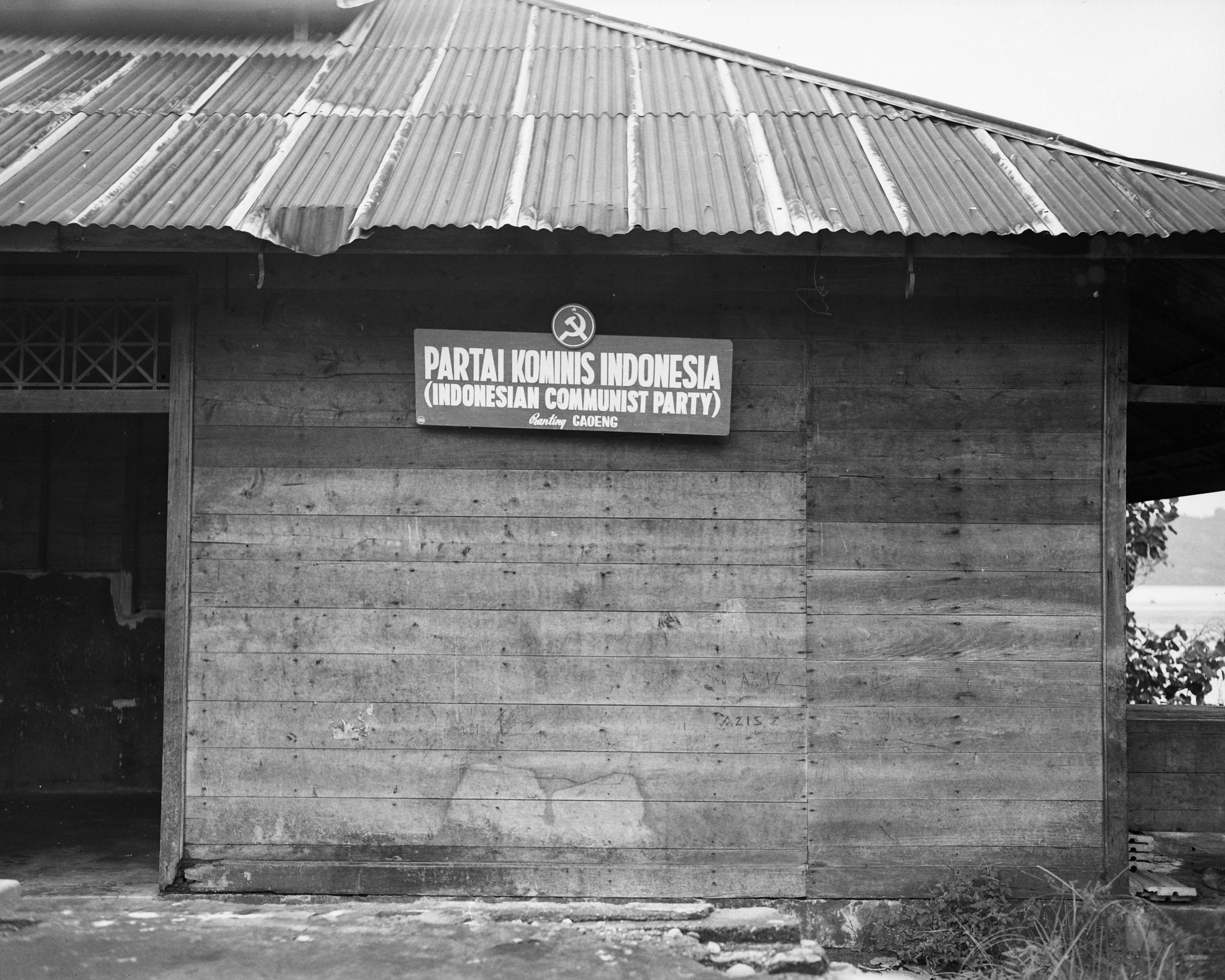
A building used as a branch office of the Indonesian Communist Party (Partai Komunis Indonesia, PKI) in Padang, 1946

The PKI re-emerged on the political scene after the 1945 surrender of Japan and actively participated in the Indonesian National Awakening; many armed units were under PKI control or influence. Although PKI militias played an important role in fighting the Dutch, President Sukarno was concerned that the party's growing influence would eventually threaten his position. Because the PKI's growth troubled the right-wing sectors of Indonesian society and some foreign powers (especially the vigorously anti-communist United States), its relationship with the other forces also fighting for independence was generally difficult.

The PKI and the Socialist Party (Partai Sosialis) formed a joint front, the People's Democratic Front, in February 1948. Although the front did not last, the Socialist Party later merged with the PKI; by this time, the Pesindo militias were under PKI control.

==== Madiun Affair ====
On 11 August 1948, Musso returned to Jakarta after twelve years in the Soviet Union. The PKI politburo was reconstructed, and included D. N. Aidit, M. H. Lukman, and Njoto. After signing the Renville Agreement in 1948, many of the republican armed units returned from zones of conflict; this gave the Indonesian republicans some confidence that they would be able to counter the PKI militarily. Guerrilla units and militias under PKI influence were ordered to disband.

In Madiun, a group of PKI military which refused to disarm were countered in September of that year; the confrontations sparked a violent uprising, which provided a pretext to clamp down on the PKI. It was claimed by army sources that the PKI had announced the proclamation of a Soviet Republic of Indonesia on 18 September, with Musso as president and Amir Sjarifuddin as prime minister. At the same time, however, the PKI had denounced the uprising and appealed for calm.

The uprising was suppressed by republican troops, and the party experienced another period of repression. On 30 September, Madiun was taken over by republican troops of the Siliwangi Division. Thousands of party members were killed, and 36,000 were imprisoned. Amongst the executed were several leaders, including Musso (who was killed on 31 October, allegedly while trying to escape from prison). Although Aidit and Lukman went into exile in China, the PKI was not banned after the Madiun Affair. It continued to operate legally and openly, and its reconstruction began in 1949.

==== Publishing ====
During the 1950s, the party began publishing again; its main publications were Harian Rakyat and Bintang Merah, as well as quarterly journal PKI dan Perwakilan.

=== Leadership of D. N. Aidit ===
In January 1951, during the meeting of the Central Committee, D. N. Aidit was chosen General Secretary. Under Aidit, the PKI grew rapidly—from 3,000–5,000 in 1950 to 165,000 in 1954 and 1.5 million in 1959. The PKI led a series of militant strikes in August 1951 which were followed by clamp-downs in Medan and Jakarta, and the party leadership briefly went underground. Also under Aidit, the PKI began to consider the possibility of cooperation with the Indonesian National Party (PNI) to overthrow the Masyumi-led cabinet of Mohammad Natsir.

=== 1955 legislative election ===
Vote share for the PKI by city/regency in the 1957 Indonesian local elections

The PKI favoured Sukarno's plans for Guided Democracy before the 1955 election, and actively supported him.

The party finished fourth in the election, with 16% of the vote and nearly two million members. It won 39 seats (out of 257), and 80 out of 514 in the Constituent Assembly. Almost 30% of the votes in East Java were cast for the PKI.

=== Struggle against capitalism ===
Opposition to continued Dutch control of Irian Jaya was often raised by the party during the decade, and the PKI office in Jakarta experienced a grenade attack in July 1957. The party made advances in municipal elections that month, and in September the Islamist Masyumi Party demanded that the PKI be banned.

On 3 December, trade unions largely under PKI control began seizing Dutch-owned companies. These seizures paved the way for the nationalization of foreign-owned businesses. The struggle against foreign capitalism gave the PKI an opportunity to profile itself as a national party.

By the mid 1950s, the PKI had a reputation of being one of the least corrupt parties in Indonesia. Officials in the US were becoming concerned that it might be difficult to defeat the PKI in elections, as they were well organized and spoke to the needs of the people. Said Richard Nixon, vice president at the time: "a democratic government was [probably] not the best kind for Indonesia."

=== PRRI rebellion ===
A coup attempt was made by pro-US forces in the military and the political right wing in February 1958. The rebels, based in Sumatra and Sulawesi, proclaimed a Revolutionary Government of the Republic of Indonesia (Pemerintah Revolusioner Republik Indonesia) on 15 February. The revolutionary government immediately began arresting thousands of PKI members in areas under their control, and the party supported Sukarno's efforts to quell the rebellion (including the introduction of martial law). The rebellion was eventually defeated.

=== Nasakom ===
In August 1959, there was an attempt on behalf of the military to prevent the PKI's party congress. The congress was held as scheduled, however, and was addressed by Sukarno. In 1960, Sukarno introduced "Nasakom": an abbreviation of nasionalisme (nationalism), agama (religion) and komunisme (communism). The PKI's role as a junior partner in the Sukarno policy was institutionalized; the PKI welcomed Nasakom, seeing it as a multi-class united front.

=== Guided democracy ===
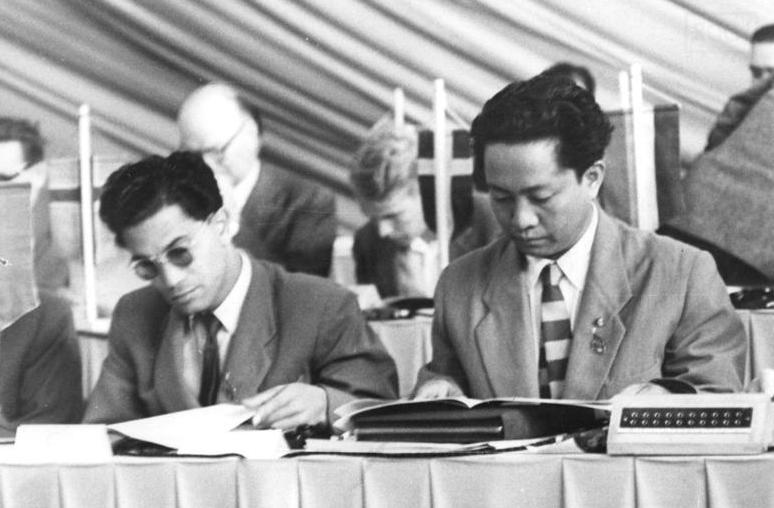
Aidit (right) and Revang at the Fifth Congress of the Socialist Unity Party of Germany in East Berlin, 11 July 1958

Although the PKI supported Sukarno, it retained its political autonomy; in March 1960, the party denounced the president's undemocratic handling of the budget. On 8 July of that year, Harian Rakyat carried an article critical of the government. The PKI leadership was arrested by the army, but was later released in accordance with Sukarno's orders. When an independent Malaysia was conceived, it was rejected by the PKI and the Malayan Communist Party.

With growing popular support and a membership of about three million by 1965, the PKI was the largest communist party outside China and the republics of the Soviet Union. The party had a firm base in mass organizations such as the Central All-Indonesian Workers Organization (Sentral Organisasi Buruh Seluruh Indonesia), People's Youth (Pemuda Rakjat), the Indonesian Women's Movement (Gerakan Wanita Indonesia), the Peasants Front of Indonesia (Barisan Tani Indonesia), the Institute of People's Culture (Lembaga Kebudajaan Rakjat) and the Association of Indonesian Scholars (Himpunan Sardjana Indonesia). At its peak, the total membership of the party and its front organizations was claimed to be one-fifth of the Indonesian population.

In March 1962, the PKI joined the government; party leaders Aidit and Njoto were appointed advisory ministers. The following month, the PKI held its party congress. In 1963, the governments of Malaysia, Indonesia and Philippines discussed territorial disputes and the possibility of a Maphilindo confederation (an idea introduced by Philippine president Diosdado Macapagal. The PKI rejected Maphilindo; party militants entered Malaysian Borneo, fighting the British, Malaysian, Australian, and New Zealand forces there. Although some groups reached the Malay Peninsula, planning to join the struggle there, most were captured on arrival. Most PKI combat units were active in the border regions of Borneo.

In January 1964, the PKI began confiscating British property owned by British companies in Indonesia. During the mid-1960s, the United States Department of State estimated party membership at about two million (3.8% of Indonesia's working-age population).

Sukarno's balancing act with the PKI, the military, nationalist factions, and Islamic groups was threatened by the party's rise. The growing influence of the PKI concerned the United States and other anti-communist Western powers. The political and economic situation had become more volatile; annual inflation reached over 600%, and living conditions for Indonesians worsened.

In December 1964, Chairul Saleh of the Murba Party (formed by former PKI leader Tan Malaka) claimed that the PKI was preparing a coup. The PKI demanded a ban on the Murba Party, which was imposed by Sukarno in early 1965. In the context of Konfrontasi with Malaysia, the PKI called for arming the people. Large sectors of the army were opposed to this, and Sukarno remained officially noncommittal. In July, about 2,000 PKI members began military training near Halim Air Force Base; the concept of arming the people had won support among the Air Force and the Navy. On 8 September, PKI demonstrators began a two-day siege of the U.S. consulate in Surabaya. Aidit addressed a PKI rally on 14 September, urging members to be alert for things to come. On 30 September, Pemuda Rakyat and Gerwani (both PKI-associated organizations) held a mass rally in Jakarta to protest the inflation crisis.

=== 30 September Movement ===
During the night of 30 September and 1 October 1965, six of Indonesia's top army generals were killed and their bodies thrown down a well. The generals' killers announced the following morning that a new Revolutionary Council had seized power, calling themselves the "30 September Movement" ("G30S"). With much of the army's top leadership dead or missing, General Suharto took control of the army and put down the abortive coup by 2 October. The army quickly blamed the coup attempt on the PKI, and began an Indonesia-wide anti-Communist propaganda campaign. Evidence linking the PKI to the generals' assassinations is inconclusive, leading to speculation that their involvement was very limited or that Suharto organised the events (in whole or in part) and scapegoated the communists. In the ensuing violent anti-communist purge, an estimated 500,000 communists (real and suspected) were killed and the PKI effectively eliminated. General Suharto outmaneuvered Sukarno politically and was appointed president in 1968, consolidating his influence on the military and government.

On 2 October, the Halim base was recaptured by the army. Although Harian Rakyat carried an article in support of the G30S coup, the official PKI line at the time was that the attempted coup was an internal affair within the armed forces. On 6 October, Sukarno's cabinet held its first meeting since 30 September; the PKI minister Njoto was in attendance. A resolution denouncing G30S was passed, and Njoto was arrested immediately after the meeting.

A mass demonstration was held in Jakarta two days later demanding a ban on the PKI, and the party's main office was burned down. On 13 October, Ansor Youth Movement (the youth wing of Nahdlatul Ulama) held anti-PKI rallies across Java. Five days later, Ansor killed about a hundred PKI members.

=== Mass killings ===
Between 100,000 and two million Indonesians were killed in the mass killings that followed. The victims included non-Communists who were slain because of mistaken identity or guilt by association. Although a lack of information makes it impossible to pinpoint an exact casualty figure, many scholars today suggest that the figure is at least 500,000. According to a CIA study of the events in Indonesia, "In terms of the numbers killed the anti-PKI massacres in Indonesia rank as one of the worst mass murders of the 20th century".

The United States played a significant role in the killings, supplying economic, technical and military aid to the Indonesian military when the killings began and providing "kill lists" (via the U.S. embassy in Jakarta) with the names of thousands of suspected high-ranking members of the PKI. A tribunal held in the Hague in 2016 concluded the massacres were crimes against humanity, and the U.S. backed the Indonesian military "knowing well that they were embarked upon a programme of mass killings". Declassified U.S. diplomatic cables released in 2017 corroborate this. According to UCLA historian Geoffrey B. Robinson, the Indonesian army's campaign of mass killings would not have occurred without the support of the US and other powerful Western governments. Documentary filmmaker Joshua Oppenheimer, director of The Act of Killing and The Look of Silence, said:

We know that U.S. embassy officials were compiling lists of thousands of names of public figures in Indonesia and handing these to the army and saying, 'Kill everybody on these lists and check off the names as you go, and give the lists back to us when you’re done'.

Time magazine presented the following account on 17 December 1965:

Communists, red sympathizers and their families are being massacred by the thousands. Backlands army units are reported to have executed thousands of communists after interrogation in remote jails. Armed with wide-bladed knives called parangs, Moslem bands crept at night into the homes of communists, killing entire families and burying their bodies in shallow graves. The murder campaign became so brazen in parts of rural East Java, that Moslem bands placed the heads of victims on poles and paraded them through villages. The killings have been on such a scale that the disposal of the corpses has created a serious sanitation problem in East Java and Northern Sumatra where the humid air bears the reek of decaying flesh. Travelers from those areas tell of small rivers and streams that have been literally clogged with bodies.

Although the motive for the killings seemed political, some scholars argue that the events were caused by panic and political uncertainty. Part of the anti-Communist force responsible for the massacres consisted of members of the criminal underworld who were given permission to engage in acts of violence.

Among the worst-affected areas was the island of Bali, where the PKI had grown rapidly before the crackdown. Approximately 80,000 people - 5% of the island's population - are estimated to have been killed. As in Java, it was the military that incited and organized the killings, despite since-discredited claims that the military actually had to restrain local people.

On 22 November, Aidit was captured and summarily executed by the army. The military announced that Aceh had been cleared of communists in December, and special military courts were set up to try jailed PKI members. The party was banned by Suharto on 12 March, and the pro-PKI Central All-Indonesian Workers Organization was banned in April. Some of the events were fictionalized in the 1982 film, The Year of Living Dangerously.

== After 1965 ==
After initial sporadic resistance, the PKI was paralyzed after the 1965–1966 killings. The party's leadership was crippled at all levels, leaving many of its former supporters and sympathizers disillusioned, leaderless and disorganized. The remnants of the party politburo issued a September 1966 statement of self-criticism, criticizing the party's previous cooperation with the Sukarno regime. After Aidit and Njoto were killed, Sudisman (the fourth-ranking PKI leader before October 1963) took over the party's leadership. He attempted to rebuild the party on a base of interlocking groups of three members but made little progress before he was captured in December 1966 and sentenced to death in 1967.

During the early 1960s, the PKI had grown rapidly under the able leadership of Said Achmad Sofyan. At the time of the military seizure of power in 1965, the party had an estimated 3,500 "members/sympathizers." During 1966 and early 1967, the PKI built an extensive underground organization, culminating in April 1967 with the establishment of a "city committee" (komite kota) in Singkawang.

In April 1967, Sofyan and his PKI colleagues met with members of the PGRS/Paraku in Sanggau Ledo to plan a joint military offensive. Most sources claim that Sofyan sought out the much stronger PGRS/Paraku and joined their struggle. But there is reason to believe that the opposite is the case. According to Pelita 1975 (a book published by Kodam XH/Tanjungpura), sometime after the military seizure of power in Jakarta, PGRS forces then in Singkawang split over questions of strategy, some arguing for a frontal military attack against Sarawak, others for increased work and recruitment among the local population. As a result of this split, about thirty PGRS members under the leadership of Huang Han and Lim Yen Hwa left Singkawang to join with Sofyan’s PKI in Sanggau Ledo.

Previously, there were four groups consisting of the PKI, Volunteers, TNKU (PARAKU), and twelve young Chinese supporters of the Sarawak Communist Party (PGRS). Then PGRS and PARAKU merged into PGRS/PARAKU, then they attacked the airfields in Singkawang and Sanggau Ledo, and succeeded in seizing 150 weapons from the military. The TNI then wiped them out with operations Sapu I, Sapu II, Sapu III. This military operation was to crush PGRS/PARAKU and PKI who were affiliated with the Chinese ethnic group in West Kalimantan, and as a result, many Chinese people who were unaware of the political problems in West Kalimantan also became victims of this incident. Some even suspect that this incident also involved ethnic cleansing against the Chinese ethnic group in the interior of Kalimantan.

Some PKI members took refuge in an isolated region south of Blitar in East Java after the crackdown on the party. Among the leaders in Blitar were the Politburo member Rewang, the party theorist Oloan Hutapea and the East Java leader Ruslan Widjajasastra. Blitar was an underdeveloped area where the PKI had strong peasant support, and the military was unaware that the PKI had consolidated there. The PKI leaders were joined by Lieutenant Colonel Pratomo, the former commander of the Pandeglang military district in West Java, who helped provide military training for the local communists. Violence erupted in Blitar in March 1968, as local peasants attacked leaders and members of Nahdlatul Ulama (NU) in retaliation for the role it had played in anti-communist persecution; about 60 NU members were killed. According to Australian political scientist Harold Crouch, it was unlikely that the killings of NU members in Blitar had been ordered by the PKI leaders. The military became aware of the PKI enclave and crushed it by mid-1968.

Some party members were outside Indonesia at the time of the 30 September events; a sizeable delegation had traveled to the People's Republic of China to participate in the anniversary celebration of the Chinese Communist Revolution. Others had left Indonesia to study in Eastern Europe, particularly Albania. Although the party apparatus continued to function in exile, it was largely isolated from political developments in Indonesia. In Java, some villages that were known refuges for members (or suspected sympathizers) were identified by authorities and closely watched for a long time.

As of 2004, former PKI members remained blacklisted from many occupations (including government jobs). During his presidency, Abdurrahman Wahid invited PKI exiles to return to Indonesia in 1999 and proposed the removal of restrictions on the open discussion of communist ideology. In arguing for the removal of the ban, Wahid cited Indonesia's original 1945 constitution (which did not prohibit, or specifically mention, communism). Wahid's proposal was vigorously opposed by some sectors of Indonesian society, especially conservative Islamic groups. In an April 2000 protest, the Indonesian Islamic Front rallied ten thousand people in Jakarta against Wahid's proposal. The army did not immediately reject the proposal, promising a "comprehensive and meticulous study" of the idea.

== Election results ==
=== People's Representative Council ===
Election	Leader	Seats		Total votes	Share of votes	Status
Election	Leader	No.	±	Total votes	Share of votes	Status
1955	D. N. Aidit	39 / 257		6,176,914	16.35%	Opposition

=== Constitutional Assembly ===
Election	Leader	Seats	Total votes	Share of votes	Bloc					
Election	Leader	1955	Total votes	Share of votes	Bloc	D. N. Aidit	80 / 514	6,232,512	16.47%	Pancasila Bloc

== See also ==
- Communism in Sumatra
- Indonesian communist exiles in Tirana
- Indonesian National Revolution
- Kehidupan Partai
