= Special Bureau of the Communist Party of Indonesia =

The Special Bureau was a largely underground arm of the Partai Komunis Indonesia (PKI), the Communist Party of Indonesia, that operated around the time of the 30 September Movement. Although it is unknown exactly who led the coup attempt against President Sukarno, many relevant individuals and facts support the hypothesis that the PKI, particularly the Special Bureau, played a large role. Many details about PKI involvement in the 30th September Movement and consequent Indonesian mass killings of 1965–66 still remain unclear.

== Background ==
According to testimony by Special Bureau leader Kamaruzaman Sjam, the Special Bureau began operating officially as an entity in 1964, but secretly operated since the early 1950s under D. N. Aidit's command. It was previously known as the "Military Section of the Organizational Department", and functioned to recruit military sympathizers to the PKI's cause. Nearing the time of the coup attempt, the Special Bureau began to have more of an influence within the PKI under the leadership of Sjam.

== Role in coup attempt ==
Although it is not exactly clear how much of a role the Special Bureau played in the actual coup attempt, it is undisputed that the agency had an impact. Evidence as explored by John Roosa suggests that Aidit approved of Sjam's collaboration with military officers in staging a preemptive strike against the army high command. According to the Supardjo document, a reliable piece of testimonial evidence from the era, Sjam was the primary organizer of the movement. However it is unclear whether Aidit initiated the movement and ordered Sjam to carry it out, or if Aidit allowed Sjam to work with the military officers on the assumption that the officers were leading the movement. In other words, the main question is whether Aidit was the mastermind of the movement, or was merely a misunderstood supporter of the movement. It is difficult to assess Aidit's involvement due to a lack of reliable and conclusive evidence. Many historians have investigated the coup, yet even in the case of Roosa, no single analysis has provided a conclusive and undisputed storyline.

=== Key players ===
The five main leaders of the Special Bureau were: • Untung • Latief • Soejono • Sjam - Appointed Karto's replacement after he died, it was rumored that Karto didn’t want Sjam because he was known to be boisterous • Pono - Sjam's assistant

=== Aidit ===
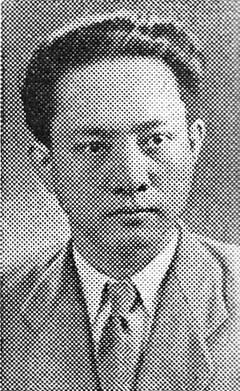
PKI Head DN Aidit

D. N. Aidit was the head of the PKI from the mid-1950s until his death on November 22, 1965. He was executed by the army before given the chance to report his actions. The party died with Aidit, as PKI members had to hide their identity to avoid being rounded up or killed. While he was alive, he was a prolific political leader within the Indonesian political community, especially within the PKI. In the historical study Pretext for Mass Murder, John Roosa explains how he has a reliable source who worked with the PKI and knew of information about the Special Bureau. Roosa's source, Hasan (pseudonym as Roosa could not disclose his source), confirms that even under Sjam's tenure, Aidit truly directed the Special Bureau. Sjam, Aidit's right hand man, was known to be loyal towards Aidit and was personally depended upon for information about military officers and affairs. Aidit and Sjam lived close together in Jakarta and held meetings that looked like regular social visits to avoid suspicion. Since Aidit was a prolific political leader searching for opinions of others, his meetings with Sjam looked typical and aroused minimal suspicion. Whether or not Aidit initiated the movement, Aidit's role in the movement, and how much knowledge he had about the movement all remain indeterminate. Hasan claims that Aidit changed the original plan, and instead of the Special Bureau waiting for the coup d'etat, the Special Bureau took action to prevent it.

=== Sjam ===
Kamaruzaman Sjam, born in Tuban in 1924, and was appointed head of the Special Bureau by Aidit in 1963 when formed head Karto died. Though it is known that Sjam took Karto's place after Karto's death, it is not certain exactly when Sjam's leadership in the Special Bureau officially started. While Karto was an experienced, well-known, and well-liked party member who combined above-ground work with secret military networking, Sjam was an anonymous figure in the party who stuck to the shadows. In his courtroom testimony, he claims to have joined the Communist Party in 1949, yet many testimonies of the time were induced by torture so it is unclear whether this is factually true. Shortly after, he was appointed to a position in the PKI. His exact role is unclear, but by his former colleague's best guess, his responsibility in the PKI was to oversee military affairs. Sjam then joined the Military Section of the PKI under Karto sometime in the 1950s and claims to have worked in the Communist Party's Organization Department in 1960. Within the Special Bureau, Pono was Sjam's assistant, Bono the Secretary, Wandi the Treasurer, and Hamim the trainer of the bureau’s cadre. Among these individuals, Sjam was the only one trusted to contact military personnel for the purposes of intelligence gathering by Aidit.

"Sjam was unwaveringly loyal to Aidit. He viewed Aidit as the Indonesian version of Stalin or Mao...Sjam felt proud to serve as Aidit's righthand man." -Roosa

At the time of the movement Sjam was neither an officially recognized high-ranking military officer nor a prominent civilian politician. No one had even contemplated the idea that this apparent nobody was the leader of an ambitious military operation to seize "all power" until Sjam himself testified to it in 1967. Sjam was ultimately executed in 1986 for his role as a leader in the PKI.
