= Kubah =

Book by Ahmad Tohari

- Cover (first edition)
- Author: Ahmad Tohari
- Language: Indonesian
- Genre: Novel
- Publisher: Pustaka Jaya (1980–1993); Gramedia (1995–present)
- Publication date: 1980
- Publication place: Indonesia
- Media type: Print (paperback)
- Pages: 184
- OCLC: 7561241

Kubah (lit. 'Cupola or Dome') is an Indonesian novel written by Ahmad Tohari. It follows a poor man named Karman who becomes a member of the Indonesian Communist Party, only to find himself a victim of the ongoing political struggles in 1950s Indonesia. After the Party's destruction he spends twelve years as a prisoner at Buru before returning to his hometown and becoming a devout Muslim.

Tohari's second novel, Kubah was written in two months and based on the events surrounding the Communist Party and the 30 September Movement coup in 1965. Published in 1980 by Pustaka Jaya, Kubah came at a time when literary works with similar themes – the victimisation of Communist Party members – were scarce. The novel has also been characterised as dawah (Islamic preaching). Reception of Kubah was mostly mixed; critics praised the novel for its subject matter and criticised it for its predictability. It received a literary award in 1981, and in 1986 it was translated into Japanese.

== Plot ==
After twelve years imprisoned at Buru Island, the former Communist Party of Indonesia (Partai Komunis Indonesia, or PKI) member Karman returns to Central Java. During his time at Buru, his wife Marni has remarried and the area has modernised considerably, rendering him uncertain where to go. He decides to stay at his cousin's home for a while. Meanwhile, Marni has heard of Karman's release and realises that she still loves him, and would thus feel uncomfortable if he returned to their hometown of Pegaten. However, their grown daughter Tini wishes to meet her father.

In a series of flashbacks, Karman's life is told. He lost his pro-Dutch father during the Indonesian National Revolution and was raised in poverty before going to work for the rich merchant Haji Bakir as a child, babysitting his daughter Rifah. In the two years Karman lived with them, the family raised him to be a devout Muslim; Karman, for his part, was a diligent worker and cared deeply for Rifah. When his uncle returned from the front, Karman was brought back home and educated until junior high school, dropping out for a lack of funds. When he was in his twenties Karman found a job at the local village chief's office with the help of a civil employee named Triman and a teacher named Margo.

Unknown to Karman, both men were PKI members and intent on making him join the party. They gave him communist pamphlets and indoctrinated him in Party philosophy. When Karman was late in telling Rifah his feelings, losing her to another man, the PKI manipulated his emotions to make him leave Islam and hate Haji Bakir. Ultimately this was successful: Karman abandoned his mandatory prayers and began to espouse the Party's politics. After Karman was refused marriage to Rifah a second time, following her husband's death, he had Haji Bakir imprisoned. In this time Karman married Marni, intending to convert her family to communism.

By 1965 Karman had become a respected member of the PKI, although the public knew him as a member of Partindo. However, following the failure of the 30 September Movement (Gerakan 30 September, or G30S) coup in the national capital at Jakarta – orchestrated by the PKI – Karman realised that his position was unsound. He and his fellow PKI members began praying regularly, but many were ultimately killed – including Triman and Margo. Karman escaped from Pegaten hours before soldiers came to arrest him and managed to avoid capture for nearly two months, generally hiding in cemeteries. After his capture Karman was exiled to Buru.

In the present day, Karman has returned to Pegaten to a warm reception. Marni, although she admits that she still loves Karman, insists that she will stay with her new husband; Haji Bakir, Karman's uncle, and Karman's mother have likewise forgiven him. Tini and Haji Bakir's grandson Jabir are betrothed as planned, and, when the villagers renovate the dilapidated mosque, Karman makes the cupola. He receives much praise for his work and finds a sense of belonging in the mosque.

== Background and writing ==
Kubah was inspired by Indonesian history, beginning in the 1940s and continuing until the 1980s. Following the national revolution from 1945 to 1949, the country was set in a state of political turmoil and abject poverty which became increasingly severe towards the end of the 1950s. By the early 1960s the PKI and other leftist parties had the support of President Sukarno, giving them greater power; PKI membership grew quickly in this period, aided by a hyperinflation and widespread poverty.

On 1 October 1965, a group of Indonesian National Armed Forces members calling themselves the 30 September Movement killed six Army generals and announced that the president was under their power; the coup was quashed the following day. Contemporary reports indicated that the PKI had been behind the G30S, a position endorsed by the Indonesian government. (Note: Kubah accepts the government's stance that the PKI was behind G30S, but several alternative theories have been put forward. McGlynn & Sulistyo (2007, pp. 6–8) record four alternative theories which render the coup as an internal Army affair, or masterminded by Sukarno, Suharto, or Indonesian intelligence.) As a result, hundreds of thousands (Note: Most estimates put the total at 500,000 dead, although numbers vary and the actual total may never be known (Ricklefs 1993, pp. 288–290).) of registered and suspected PKI members were killed or exiled over the following decade, effectively destroying the Party. By 1974 Buru held some 10,000 prisoners, while others were held elsewhere or forced to stay abroad. Political prisoners began to be released by the 1970s, but saw systematic discrimination at all levels of society: they found themselves under surveillance and with little hope of employment.

Kubah was the second novel written by Ahmad Tohari, who had been in senior high school when the G30S announced its coup. A devout Muslim who had trained as a doctor and ran a pesantren (Islamic boarding school) in Central Java, Tohari began to focus on writing when his first novel, Di Kaki Bukit Cibalak (On the Foothill of Cibalak; 1978), won a prize from the Jakarta Arts Council. He finished Kubah in two months, first making a thematic overview for each chapter and then developing it further while writing. He deliberately left the novel's ending open to interpretation, intending for readers to think for themselves.

== Themes ==
Kubah is an early example of literature dealing with the G30S and PKI, although earlier examples exist. Former Indonesian president Abdurrahman Wahid described it as the first to deal with reconciliation between PKI members and general Indonesian society after G30S, an issue which was "hyper-sensitive" at the time. The historian Anna-Greta Nilsson Hoadley writes that Kubah explored why a person would be motivated to join the party, emphasizing poverty, cultural pressure, and active propaganda by the PKI. In the end, Karman is ultimately an "innocent victim", who only joined the Party to improve his own standing. Even after his release Karman remains in a state of fear, "marked by a prisoner's vulnerability." The literary critics Maman S. Mahayana, Oyon Sofyan, and Achmad Dian wrote that, in this sense, Karman becomes representative of all PKI members who were arrested following G30S.

Mahayana, writing elsewhere, sees Karman as undergoing an existential quest to establish his identity, seemingly finding an answer in the PKI but ultimately becoming trapped by them. Mahayana indicates that a religious message is evident beginning with the novel's opening, in which Tohari provides a four-line quote from an old Javanese text regarding faith and becoming more explicit later on. He finds Karman's dealing with the raftsman Kastagethek while escaping from the government the most explicit expression of Tohari's intent; unlike Karman, Kastagethek is a devout yet simple man who is happy in his poverty, leading Karman to question his own views before ultimately finding his identity in Islam. Mahayana thus argued that Kubah was meant as dawah, or Islamic preaching, with its message that humans should recognise their status as creatures of God conveyed through characters' dialogue and actions.

== Release and reception ==
Kubah was originally published by the Jakarta-based Pustaka Jaya in 1980; unlike Di Kaki Bukit Cibalak and most of Tohari's later novels, it had not been serialised first. Since 1995 it has been published by Gramedia, seeing four printings as of 2012. The work was translated into Japanese by Shinobu Yamane in 1986, under the title Shinsei.

The novel's reception was mixed. It was awarded the Buku Utama Prize in 1981 for "increasing knowledge, spreading manners, and maturing Indonesian culture," (Note: Original: "... meningkatkan pengetahuan, memperluas budi pekerti, dan mematangkan kebudayaan masyarakat Indonesia.") an award which included a trophy and Rp. 1 million in prize money. Mahayana found it worthy of this prize, praising Kubah's use of flashback and the complicated issues it raised. Wahid, at the time an active Islamic intellectual with the Nahdlatul Ulama, wrote in 1980 that Kubah had poorly realised its potential; he characterised it as a beginner's work: lacking suspense, overly moralistic, and predictable.

Tohari's trilogy Ronggeng Dukuh Paruk (The Dancer of Paruk Village; 1981–1985), which has proven to be his most famous, also dealt with the G30S and the PKI. However, unlike Kubah, parts of Ronggeng Dukuh Paruk remained censored until 2003. Numerous novels dealing with G30S and the PKI, written by other authors, have also been published since Kubah.

== Works cited ==
- "Buku Utama, Hadiah". Encyclopedia of Jakarta (in Indonesian). Jakarta City Government. Archived from the original on 5 September 2013.
- Crouch, Harold (2007). The Army and Politics in Indonesia (Revised ed.). Jakarta: Equinox. ISBN 978-979-3780-50-4.
- Hoadley, Anna-Greta Nilsson (2005). Indonesian Literature Vs New Order Orthodoxy: The Aftermath of 1965–1966. Copenhagen: NIAS Press. ISBN 978-87-91114-61-8.
- Mahayana, Maman S. (2007). Ekstrinsikalitas Sastra Indonesia [Extrinsic Events in Indonesian Literature] (in Indonesian). Jakarta: RajaGrafindo Persada. ISBN 978-979-769-115-8.
- Mahayana, Maman S.; Sofyan, Oyon; Dian, Achmad (1995). Ringkasan dan Ulasan Novel Indonesia Modern [Summaries and Commentary on Modern Indonesian Novels] (in Indonesian). Jakarta: Grasindo. ISBN 978-979-553-123-4.
- Maryono, Agus (21 June 2009). "Ahmad Tohari: 'If only our leaders read literary works'". The Jakarta Post. Archived from the original on 7 December 2012.
- McGlynn, John H; Sulistyo, Hermawan (2007). Indonesia in the Soeharto Years: Issues, Incidents and Images. Jakarta: Lontar Foundation. ISBN 978-9971-69-358-9.
- Ricklefs, M. C. (1993). A History of Modern Indonesia since c.1300 (2nd ed.). MacMillan. ISBN 978-0-333-57689-2.
- Tohari, Ahmad (2012). Kubah [Cupola] (in Indonesian). Jakarta: Gramedia. ISBN 978-979-22-8774-5.
- Tohari, Ahmad (2009). "Tanpa Dicitakan, Saya Jadi Pengarang" [Without Knowing It, I Had Become a Writer]. In Eneste, Pamusuk (ed.). Proses Kreatif: Mengapa dan Bagaimana Saya Mengarang [Creative Process: Why and How I Write] (in Indonesian). Vol. 4. Jakarta: Kepustakaan Populer Gramedia. pp. 113–126. ISBN 978-979-91-0208-9.
