= Ahmad Tohari =

Indonesian author (born 1948)

- Born: Ahmad Tohari; June 13, 1948 (age 78); Tinggarjaya, Jatilawang, Banyumas
- Writing career
- Language: Indonesian
- Genre: Fiction
- Notable work: Ronggeng Dukuh Paruk

Ahmad Tohari (born 13 June 1948) is an Indonesian author.

== Early life ==
Ahmad Tohari was born in the village of Tinggarjaya, Jatilawang, Banyumas, the fourth of twelve children. Although Tohari's parents were both from farming backgrounds, his father had received an education and, while employed as director of the regional office for the Ministry of Religious Affairs, was responsible for the establishment of the pesantren in Tinggarjaya. Tohari's father has been described as a "progressive intellectual" and under his guidance Tohari developed a deep understanding of Indonesian politics and a strong sense of social and environmental responsibility. Tohari has described himself as a mischievous child who often visited a neighboring abangan village (i.e., one that practices a less orthodox version of the Islamic faith). This experience, plus his mother's tolerance, gave Tohari the opportunity to experience lifestyles different to his own. His mother maintained good relations with a ronggeng dancer from a neighboring village, and it was this that later provided Tohari with the background for the Ronggeng Dukuh Paruk trilogy. Although Tohari's education in the pesantren developed by his parents left him with deep religious convictions, as an adult his progressive interpretation of Indonesian Islam has been criticized by some as being out of step with the status quo. Tohari has described himself as a "progressive religious intellectual" whose aim is to nurture a modern Islam that honors Indonesia's diverse indigenous culture and traditions while following the teaching of the Koran. Tohari's formal education ended with high school in Purwokerto. He explored several faculties of economics, social and political studies and medicine, but did not graduate from any of them. Tohari didn't initially plan to become a novelist, preferring instead to study medicine at the school of medicine of the Jakarta Islamic Hospital Foundation, but was forced to leave for economic reasons.

== Career ==
Tohari moved to Jakarta in the early 1970s and worked briefly Bank Negara Indonesia (BNI) (1970–72), was editor of the newspaper Harian Merdeka (1979-1981) and editor of the magazine Amanah (1986 - 1993). He began writing short stories, poems and essays in the early 1970s while working for the BNI. Initial recognition came in 1975 when he was named favorite short story writer in a Dutch Radio Hilversum contest. Further success came in 1978 when his novel, Di Kaki Bukit Cibalak (On the Foothill of Cibalak), won a novel writing contest organized by the Jakarta Arts Council. In 1980, he published his novel, Kubah (Dome). This was followed in 1981 with publication of the first book of Tohari's famous trilogy, Ronggeng Dukuh Paruk, in series in the publication Kompas daily. The second and third books, Lintang Kemukus Dini Hari (A Shooting Star at Dawn) and Jentera Bianglala (The Rainbow's Arc), were published in 1985 and 1986 respectively. The trilogy and Kubah discussed in some detail the fate of those accused of collaborating with the Communist Party after the 30 September Movement. This did affect publication. Although the trilogy was serialized in Kompas, several sections of the final in the trilogy, Jentera Bianglala, had to be rewritten as the daily feared publishing them in their original form. The complete trilogy was later published with the previously removed sections restored.

Having spent most of the 1970s and 1980s working in Jakarta, Tohari decided to return to his village because he felt he did not belong in the city. In interviews, Tohari has explained how his ideas for books, including Ronggeng Dukuh Paruk, have often been inspired by things around his home village. Tohari still lives in the Banyumas area and his experience of growing up in a small village continues to color his literary works. Tohari is married with five children.

Tohari is a prolific writer. Besides the aforementioned works he has published a number of works, including eleven novels, three anthologies of political and religious essays, two collection of short stories, and numerous individual short stories and essays. Notable works include Bekisar Merah, Belantik, Mas Mantri Gugat, Lingkar Tanah Lingkar Air. Many of the short stories that were originally published in newspapers and magazines have been collected into the compilations Senyum Karyamin and Nyanyian Malam. He is one of only a few Indonesian writers who have written stories set against the background of the Indonesian killings of 1965-66.

His books have been published in Japanese, Chinese, Dutch and German. An English edition of Ronggeng Dukuh Paruk was published in 2003 by the Lontar Foundation in Jakarta.

In 2011, the second film version of Tohari's novel Sang Penari (The Dancer), produced by Shanty Harman and directed by Ifa Isfansyah, was screened in Jakarta. Tohari has voiced his approval of this latest screen version of his work, having previously expressed his disappointment in the 1983 version, Darah dan Mahkota Ronggeng (Blood and Crown of the Dancing Girl), made by filmmaker Yazman Yazid.

He has received several national and international awards for his work, including the S.E.A. Write Award (Southeast Asian Writers Award) in 1995, and a Fellowship through the International Writing Program in Iowa City, Iowa. He has often written for the national newspaper Suara Merdeka and the famous weekly Tempo. He was staff editor for the Jakarta newspaper, Merdeka from 1979 until 1981, and General Editor for Amanah, a political and religious magazine, from 1986 to 1993.

In 2009, Tohari set up a magazine called Ancas (Vision) in his home town. Initially run by just 10 people, the aim of the magazine is to preserve and promote the local Banyumasan language. The venture is proving to be a successful one, with circulation growing from 2,000 to 3,500 in just two years. With his family, he runs an Islamic school (pesantren), and is a well-known export of Javanese folk arts, and a consultant for the regional office of the Indonesian Ministry of Culture and Education. In addition, Tohari has given his support to young writers in his recent endorsement of three new short story compilations, and in the encouragement he has given to a group of writers planning to set up an independent publishing house. Tohari continues to write, and has stated his desire to write one more novel to match Ronggeng Dukuh Paruk.

== List of works ==
=== Short stories ===
- Senyum Karyamin, Jakarta: Gramedia, 73p., 1989.
- Nyanyian Malam, Jakarta: Grasindo, 94p., 2000.
- Mata yang Enak Dipandang, Jakarta: Gramedia, 216p., 2013.

=== Novels ===
- Kubah, Jakarta: Pustaka Jaya, 1980.
- Ronggeng Dukuh Paruk, Jakarta: Gramedia, 174p., 1982.
- Lintang Kemukus Dini Hari, Jakarta: Gramedia, 211p., 1985
- Di Kaki Bukit Cibalak, Jakarta: Pustaka Jaya, 191p., 1986
- Bekisar Merah, Jakarta: Gramedia, 312p., 1993—Jakarta: Gramedia, 358p., 2011.
- Lingkar Tanah Lingkar Air, Purwokerto: Harta Prima, 151p., 1995
