= Abangan =

Ethnic group

The Abangan are Javanese people who are Muslims and practice a much more syncretic version of Islam than the more orthodox santri. The term, apparently derived from the Javanese language word for red, abang, was first developed by Clifford Geertz, but the meaning has since shifted. Abangan are more inclined to follow a local system of beliefs called adat and Kebatinan than pure Sharia (Islamic law). Their belief system integrates Hinduism, Buddhism and animism. However, some scholars hold that what has classically been viewed as Indonesian variance from Islam is often a part of that faith in other countries. For example, Martin van Bruinessen notes similarity between adat and historical practice among Muslims in Egypt as described by Edward Lane.

== Indonesian mass killings of 1965–66 ==
Many Abangans were supporters of the Communist Party of Indonesia (PKI), and their interests were thus supported by the PKI. They subsequently made up most of the people who were slaughtered in the anti-Communist Indonesian mass killings of 1965–66. Abangans were targeted for attacks by Ansor, the youth wing of Nahdlatul Ulama and the Santri, with help from the Indonesian Army. To avoid being classified as atheists and communists, Abangan Muslims were forced by the Indonesian government to convert to Hinduism and Christianity in the aftermath of the slaughter.

== See also ==
- Islam Nusantara
- Kejawèn
