= Indonesian mass killings of 1965–66 =

Anti-communist killings and unrest in Indonesia

- Part of the Cold War in Asia and transition to the New Order
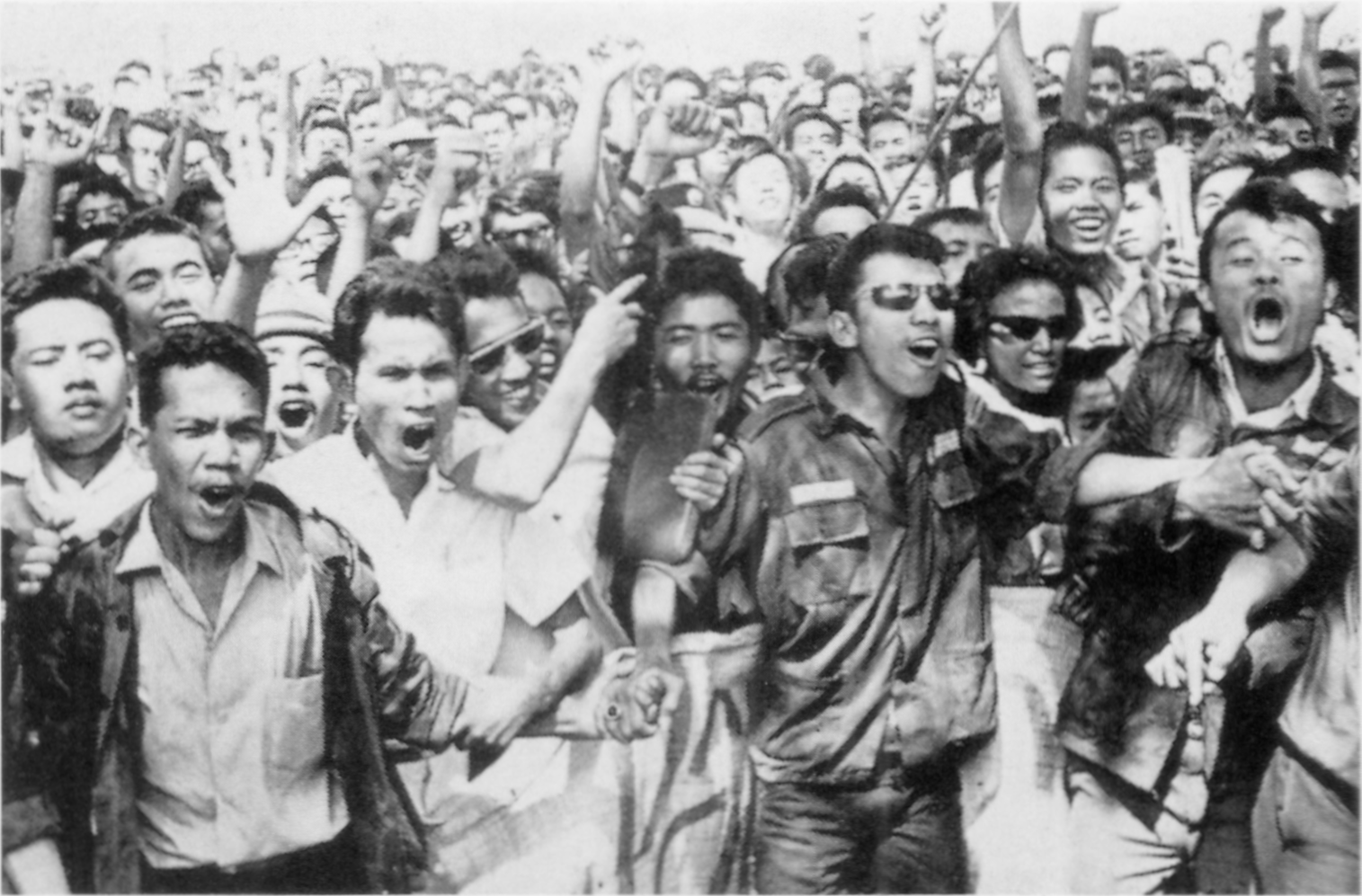
- Anti-Sukarno demonstration organized by the military-backed student group KAMI
- Location: Indonesia
- Date: October 1965– c. March 1966
- Target: PKI members, alleged PKI sympathisers, Gerwani members, ethnic Buginese bissu, ethnic Javanese Abangan, atheists, and ethnic Chinese
- Attack type: Politicide, mass murder, genocide
- Deaths: 500,000–1,000,000+
- Perpetrators: Indonesian Army and various paramilitary death squads including the Pancasila Youth, gangs and vigilante mobs, supported by the United States, the United Kingdom and other allied governments
- Motive: Anti-communism, Indonesian nationalism, revenge for the 30 September movement, Sinophobia, anti-atheism

From October 1965 to March 1966, a series of large-scale killings and civil unrest primarily targeting members and supposed sympathizers of the Communist Party of Indonesia (PKI) took place in Indonesia. Other affected groups included alleged communist sympathisers, Gerwani women, trade unionists, ethnic Javanese Abangan, ethnic Chinese, atheists and other non-Muslims, and leftists in general. According to the most widely published estimates, at least 500,000 to 1 million people were killed. Some of the higher estimates reach figures as much as 2 to 3 million people killed.

The killings, sometimes described as a politicide and occasionally as a genocide, were instigated by the Indonesian Army under Suharto. Research and declassified documents demonstrate the Indonesian authorities received support from foreign countries such as the United States and the United Kingdom.

The killings began as an anti-communist purge following an attempted coup d'état by the 30 September Movement, which they self-proclaimed over media and communication outlets. It was a pivotal event in the transition to the "New Order" and the elimination of the PKI as a political force, with impacts on the global Cold War. The Army, after banning all independent news sources from publishing for a week, almost immediately pinned the abortive coup attempt to the PKI.

Concurrently, the intelligence agencies of the United States, United Kingdom, and Australia engaged in black propaganda campaigns against Indonesian communists. During the Cold War, the U.S. government and its Western allies had the goal of halting the spread of communism in addition to bringing countries into the sphere of Western Bloc influence. Separately, Britain had reasons for seeking Sukarno's removal, as his non-communist government was involved in an undeclared war with neighboring Malaysia, a Commonwealth federation of former British colonies.

Communists were purged from political, social, and military life in Indonesia, and the PKI itself was disbanded and banned. Mass killings began in October 1965, in the weeks following the coup attempt, and reached their peak over the remainder of the year before subsiding in the early months of 1966. They started in the capital, Jakarta, and spread to Central and East Java, and later Bali. Thousands of local vigilantes and army units killed actual and alleged PKI members, as well as members of other marginalized groups. Killings occurred across the country, with the most intense in the PKI strongholds of Central Java, East Java, Bali, and northern Sumatra. The upheavals led to the fall of Sukarno, who had been granted the title "President for life", and ushering in Suharto's three decades of pro-West authoritarian militaristic presidency.

The killings are skipped over in most Indonesian history textbooks and have received little attention by Indonesians due to their suppression under the Suharto regime, as well as lack of international attention. The search for satisfactory explanations for the scale and frenzy of the violence has challenged scholars from all ideological perspectives. The possibility of returning to similar upheavals is cited as a factor in the "New Order" administration's political conservatism and tight control of the political system. Vigilance and stigma against a perceived communist threat remained a hallmark of Suharto's doctrine, and it is still in force even today.

Despite a consensus at the highest levels of the U.S. and British governments that it would be necessary "to liquidate Sukarno", as related in a Central Intelligence Agency (CIA) memorandum from 1962, and the existence of extensive contacts between anti-communist army officers and the U.S. military establishment – including the training of over 1,200 officers, "including senior military figures", and providing weapons and economic assistance – the CIA denied active involvement in the killings. Declassified U.S. documents in 2017 revealed that the U.S. government had detailed knowledge of the mass killings from the beginning and was supportive of the actions of the Indonesian Army. U.S. complicity in the killings, which included providing extensive lists of PKI officials to Indonesian death squads, has been established by historians and journalists.

A top-secret CIA report from 1968 stated that the massacres "rank as one of the worst mass murders of the 20th century, along with the Soviet purges of the 1930s, the Nazi mass murders during the Second World War, and the Maoist bloodbath of the early 1950s."

== Background ==
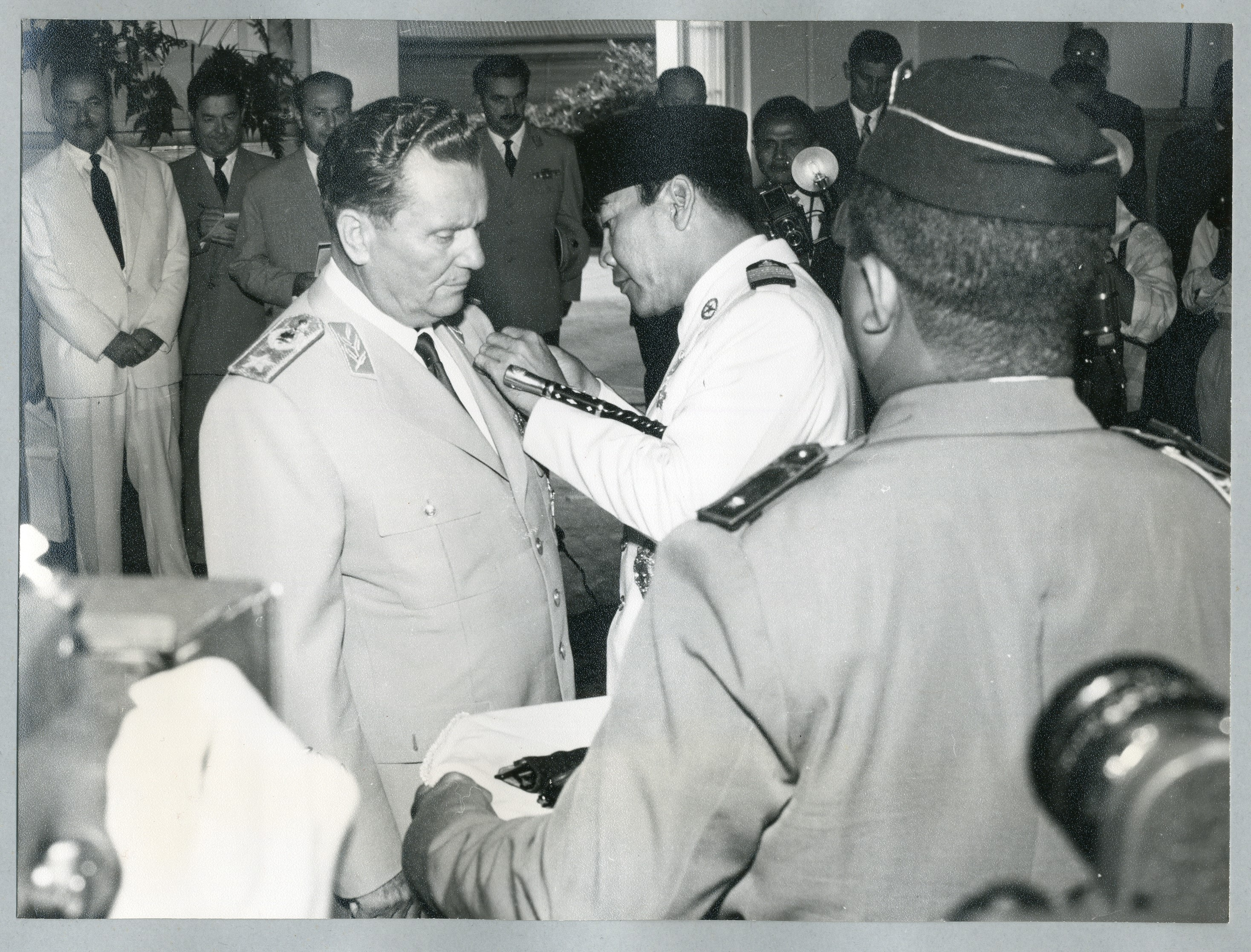
Sukarno with Yugoslav president Josip Broz Tito during a 1958–59 state visit. Tito would become the founding chair of the Non-Aligned Movement in 1961.

Support for Sukarno's presidency under his "Guided Democracy" depended on his forced and unstable "Nasakom" coalition between the military, religious groups, and communists. The rise in influence and the increasing militancy of the Communist Party of Indonesia (PKI), and Sukarno's support of it, was a source of serious concern for Muslims and the military, and tension grew steadily in the early and mid-1960s. The third-largest communist party in the world, the PKI had approximately 300,000 cadres and full membership of around two million. The PKI largely aimed for its efforts to be non-violent, partially due to the party's political popularity in the country and established role in the Sukarno government. The party's assertive efforts to speed up land reform frightened those who controlled the land and threatened the social position of Muslim clerics. Sukarno required government employees to study his Nasakom principles as well as Marxist theory. He had met with Zhou Enlai, Premier of the People's Republic of China, and after this meeting had decided to create a militia, called the Fifth Force, which he intended to control personally. Sukarno ordered weapons from China to equip this Fifth Force. He declared in a speech that he favoured revolutionary groups whether they were nationalist, religious, or communist, stating, "I am a friend of the Communists because the Communists are revolutionary people." He said at a Non-Aligned Movement summit meeting in Cairo in October 1964 that his current purpose was to drive all of Indonesian politics to the left and thereby to neutralise the "reactionary" elements in the Army that could be dangerous for the revolution. Sukarno's international policies increasingly reflected his rhetoric.

Sukarno hosted the Bandung Conference in 1955 (in Bandung, Indonesia). It was a conference of mostly former colonised countries throughout Asia and Africa (including China, North Vietnam, Laos, and Cambodia). The conference was the predecessor to the Non-Aligned Movement and was not a communist convention. However, this was enough for the U.S. to be very suspicious of Sukarno and suspect him of deep communist sympathies.

Domestically, the PKI experienced rising popularity in Indonesia, with its performance increasing in elections throughout the 1950s. However, this also meant that tensions also increased when some communist party sympathizers attacked religious people in the villages, and accused landowners of being capitalists akin to the Dutch colonialists, increasing hatred towards the communists amongst the majority of conservative Indonesians. The PKI gained popularity amongst Indonesians because of their relatively low corruption and its accomplishment of its political goals. Rural polarization further increased after the PKI launched what it called "unilateral action" (aksi sepihak) to enforce at its own hands the earlier land reform laws of 1959 and 1960 that had gone unimplemented, resulting in clashes between militant peasants and militias affiliated with the landowners.

As early as 1958, Western powers—in particular, the U.S. and the U.K.—pushed for policies that would encourage the Indonesian Army to forcefully act against the PKI and the Left, policies which included a covert propaganda campaign which was designed to damage the reputation of Sukarno and the PKI, and secret assurances along with military and financial support to anti-communist leaders within the Army. As approved by President Kennedy, the U.S. government supported the Army with its Territorial Management program, in which it gained inroads in local Indonesian communities by contributing to development. During Permesta and the West New Guinea dispute, the army gained a corrupt reputation because it hoarded rural resources. Local involvement allowed the army to re-establish itself, giving it basis to later carry out the killings.

The U.S. Central Intelligence Agency (CIA) considered assassinating Sukarno and selected an "asset" to do the job, but instead produced a pornographic film with an actor portraying Sukarno and a Soviet flight attendant to delegitimise him and paint him as a communist. However, the video was not released because the agency could not put together a convincing enough film.

== 30 September ==
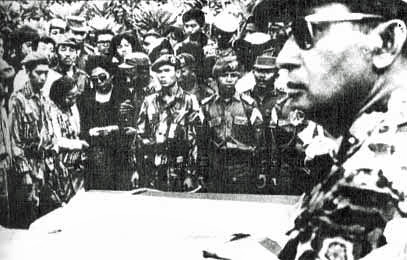
Major General Suharto (at right, foreground) attends a funeral for generals assassinated on 5 October 1965

On the evening of 30 September 1965, a group of militants, known as the 30 September Movement, captured and executed six of Indonesia's top military generals. The movement proclaimed itself as Sukarno's protectors, issuing a pre-emptive strike to prevent a possible coup by the "anti-Sukarno", pro-Western Council of Generals.

Following the execution, the movement's forces occupied Merdeka Square in Jakarta and the presidential palace. Shortly afterwards, however, President Sukarno refused to commit to the movement, for it had captured and assassinated many of his top generals. As the night continued, its poor leadership began to show, starting with a series of incoherent radio messages. The movement mainly aimed to occupy the main telecommunications building; however, it ignored the east side of the square, which was the location of Kostrad, the armed forces strategic reserve. At the time, Major General Suharto was in control of the reserve, and upon hearing the news of the takeover, he quickly capitalised on the movement's weaknesses, regaining control of the square without resistance. Following the surrender, the movement's troops did not take further action. At the same time, the Indonesian military slowly gained influence as Sukarno's waned, and within days, the government was under the control of Suharto. He immediately deployed troops and dispersed the movement while trumpeting the movement's actions as a "danger" to the nation.

A military propaganda campaign to link the coup attempt with the PKI, masterminded by Suharto and the military, began to sweep the country on 5 October (the Armed Forces Day and the day of the six generals' state funeral). Graphic images and descriptions of the murdered, tortured, and even castrated generals began to circulate the country. The campaign was successful despite falsified information, convincing both Indonesian and international audiences that the murders were a PKI attempt to undermine the government under President Sukarno. Though the PKI denied involvement, pent-up tension and hatred that had built up over the years were released.

Even though the 30 September Movement killed 12 people, Suharto ultimately presented it as a nationwide conspiracy to commit mass murder. Millions of people associated with the PKI, even illiterate peasants from remote villages, were presented as murderers and accomplices of the movement. Already in early 1966, two Indonesian specialists at Cornell University, Benedict Anderson and Ruth McVey, observed in their Cornell Paper that Suharto's Army began the anti-communist campaign well after the 30 September Movement had collapsed. Between the moment that the movement ended and the moment that the Army's mass arrests began, three weeks had elapsed in which no violence or trace of civil war occurred, even according to the Army itself. Sukarno constantly protested the purge, stating that the Army was "burning down a house to kill a rat", but he was powerless as Suharto commanded a firm hold on the armed forces.

== Political purge ==
The Army removed top civilian and military leaders who it believed were sympathetic to the PKI in the weeks that followed. Slowly, the parliament and cabinet were purged of Sukarno loyalists and those linked to the PKI were stripped of their positions. Leading PKI members were immediately arrested, some summarily executed. Army leaders organised demonstrations in Jakarta during which on 8 October, the PKI Jakarta headquarters was burned down. Anti-Communist youth groups were formed, including the Army-backed Indonesian Students' Action Front (KAMI), the Indonesian Youth and Students' Action Front (KAPPI), and the Indonesian University Alumni Action Front (KASI). In Jakarta and West Java, over 10,000 PKI activists and leaders were arrested, including famed novelist Pramoedya Ananta Toer.

The initial deaths occurred during organised clashes between the Army and the PKI, including some Indonesian armed forces and police units who were sympathetic to communism and were resisting General Suharto's crackdown. For example, much of the Indonesian Marine Corps, the Air Force, and the Police Mobile Brigade Corps had many servicemen and even commanding officers holding PKI or affiliate organization membership cards due to a huge party-led effort to recruit from these. In early October, forces of the Strategic Command (Suharto's Kostrad) and the RPKAD para-commandos led by Colonel Sarwo Edhie Wibowo were sent to Central Java, a region with strong PKI support, while Army servicemen whose loyalty was uncertain were ordered to be discharged from the ranks. At the same time, the Siliwangi Division was deployed to guard Jakarta and West Java, both of which, unlike Central and East Java, remained relatively immune to the mass killings. Early fighting in the Central Java highlands and around Madiun suggested the PKI might be able to establish a rival regime centred on these regions. However, widespread fears of a civil war between factions supported by the United States and China, respectively, quickly evaporated as the forces sent by Suharto took control. Many rebel commanders chose not to fight as Suharto-deployed forces arrived, although resistance came from some, like General Supardjo, for a few more weeks.

As the Sukarno presidency began to unravel and as Suharto began to assert his control following the coup attempt, the PKI's top national leadership was hunted down and arrested, and some were summarily executed. In early October, PKI chairman D. N. Aidit had flown to Central Java, where the coup attempt had been supported by leftist armed forces and police officers in Yogyakarta and in Salatiga and Semarang in Central Java. Fellow senior PKI leader Njoto was shot around 6 November, Aidit was shot on 22 November, and First Deputy PKI Chairman M. H. Lukman was killed shortly afterward.

== Massacres ==
Communists, red sympathizers and their families are being massacred by the thousands. Backlands army units are reported to have executed thousands of communists after interrogation in remote jails. Armed with wide-bladed knives called parangs, Moslem bands crept at night into the homes of communists, killing entire families and burying their bodies in shallow graves ... The murder campaign became so brazen in parts of rural East Java, that Moslem bands placed the heads of victims on poles and paraded them through villages. The killings have been on such a scale that the disposal of the corpses has created a serious sanitation problem in East Java and Northern Sumatra where the humid air bears the reek of decaying flesh. Travelers from those areas tell of small rivers and streams that have been literally clogged with bodies.

— Time, 17 December 1965.

The killings started in October 1965 in Jakarta, spread to Central and Eastern Java and, later, to Bali. Smaller outbreaks occurred in parts of other islands, including Sumatra. The communal tensions and bitter hatreds that had built up were played upon by the Army leadership, which characterised communists as villains, and many Indonesian civilians took part in the killings. The worst massacres were in Aceh, Central and East Java, and Bali, where PKI support was at its strongest. The situation varied across the country, and the role of the Army has never been fully explained. In some areas, the Army organised, encouraged, trained, and supplied civilian groups and local militias. In other areas, communal vigilante action preceded the Army, although in most cases, killings did not commence before military units had sanctioned violence by instruction or example. It was in the earlier stages of the killings that the Army's direct involvement in clashes with the PKI occurred. By the end of October, groups of devout Muslims joined the purge of communists, claiming it was their duty to cleanse Indonesia of atheism.

In some areas, civilian militia knew where to find known communists and their sympathisers, while in others, the Army demanded lists of communists from village heads. There was no disguise associated with PKI membership, and most suspects were easy to identify within communities. The U.S. Embassy in Jakarta supplied the Indonesian military with lists of up to 5,000 suspected communists. Although some PKI branches organised resistance and reprisal killings, most went passively to their deaths. Not all victims were PKI members. Often the label "PKI" was used to include anyone to the left of the Indonesian National Party (PNI). In other cases, victims were suspected or simply alleged communists or were victims of grievance settling with little or no political motive. Anti-communist killings were then instigated with youths, assisted by the Army. Most of the victims were not major political figures and were mostly among the poor and the lower middle-class such as farmers, plantation labourers, factory workers, students, teachers, artists, and civil servants. They were often targeted because they or someone they knew, such as a friend or family member, had joined the PKI or an affiliated organisation.

With very few exceptions, the killings were not spontaneous but carried out with a high degree of organisation. Most of the victims were also detainees of the Indonesian Army, making the killings summary executions. Initially, many leftists willingly turned themselves in to the military and the police, believing they would be the safe and, therefore, the reasonable thing to do. The killings were carried out 'face to face' as in Rwanda or Cambodia, unlike the systemized methods of killing used by Nazi Germany. The methods of non-mechanised violence and killing included shooting, dismembering alive, stabbing, disembowelment, castration, impaling, strangling, and beheading with Japanese-style samurai swords. Firearms and automatic weapons were used on a limited scale, with most of the killings being carried out with knives, sickles, machetes, swords, ice picks, bamboo spears, iron rods and other makeshift weapons. Islamic extremists often paraded severed heads on spikes. Corpses were often thrown into rivers, and at one point, officials complained to the Army of congested rivers that run into the city of Surabaya due to the bodies. In areas such as Kediri in East Java, Nahdlatul Ulama youth wing (Ansor Youth Movement) members lined up communists, cut their throats and disposed of the bodies in rivers. Rows of severed penises were often left behind as a reminder to the rest. The killings left whole sections of villages empty, and the houses of victims or the interned were looted and often handed over to the military.

Local Chinese Indonesians were killed in some areas, and their properties looted and burned as a result of anti-Chinese racism, on the excuse that D. N. Aidit had brought the PKI closer to China. Ita Fatia Nadia, an Indonesian historian of Chinese descent, stated in The Jakarta Post that her father was one of the Pemuda Pathuk and a Socialist Party of Indonesia member, who disappeared in October 1965 after Indonesian Army soldiers came by and inspected her house in Yogyakarta when she was seven years old. She remembers when she saw bodies on her way to school and realized that family members and neighbors who went missing were killed; her mother later told her to ignore it. In the predominantly Christian islands of Nusa Tenggara, Christian clergy and teachers suffered at the hands of Muslim youth.

Although there were occasional and isolated flare-ups until 1969, the killings mostly subsided by March 1966, when there were no more suspects or authorities intervened. Solo residents said that exceptionally high flooding in March 1966 of the Solo River, considered mystical by the Javanese, signalled the end of the killings.

=== Java ===
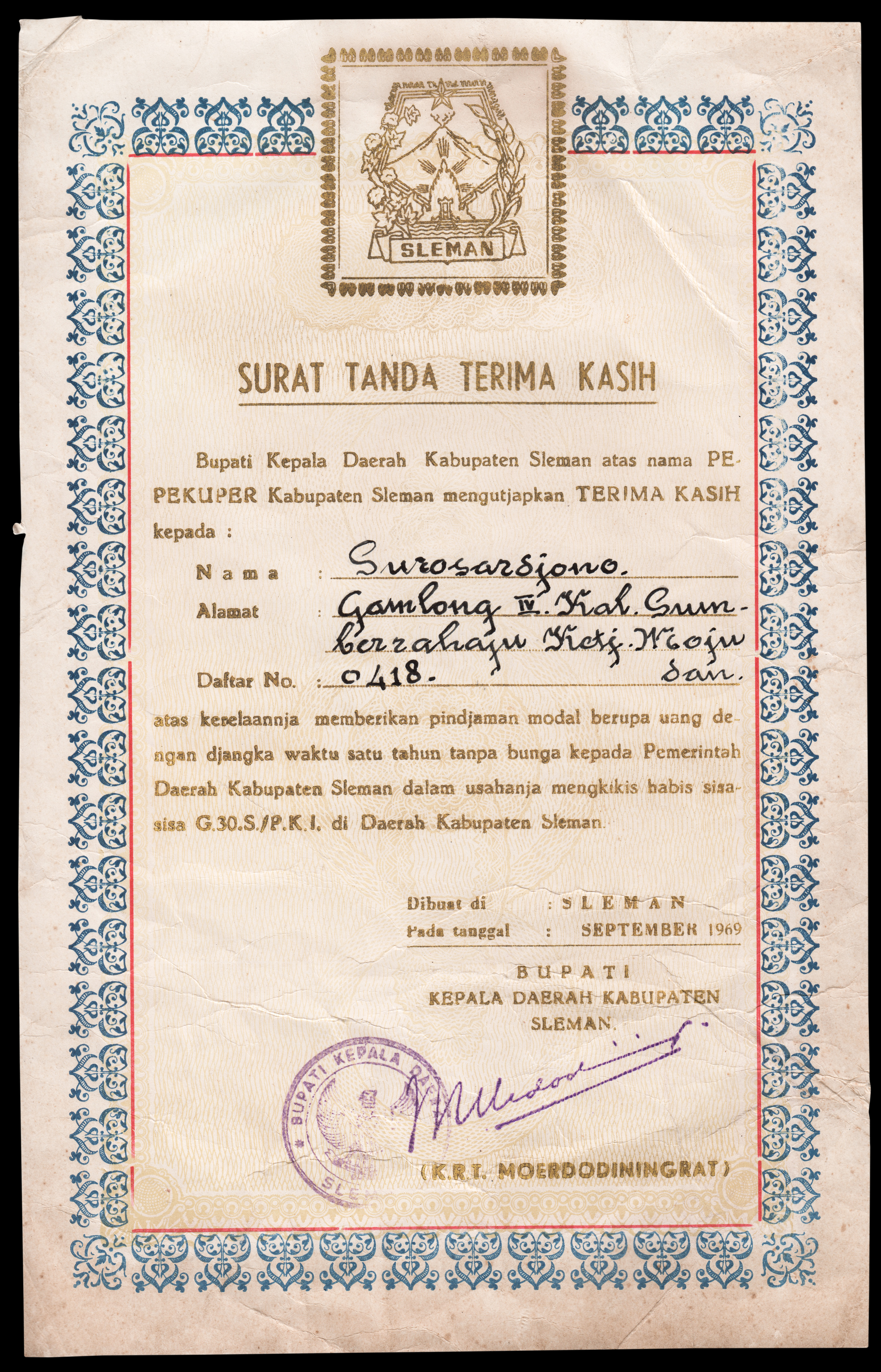
A certificate of gratitude from the Regent of Sleman for financial donations to the elimination of the PKI

In Java, much of the killing was along aliran (cultural stream) loyalties; the Army encouraged santri (more devout and orthodox Muslims) among the Javanese to seek out PKI members among the abangan (less orthodox) Javanese. The conflict that had broken out in 1963 between the Muslim party Nahdlatul Ulama (NU) and the PKI turned into killings in the second week of October. The Muslim group Muhammadiyah proclaimed in early November 1965 that the extermination of "Gestapu/PKI" constituted Holy War ("Gestapu" being the military's abbreviation for the 30 September Movement, Gerakan September Tiga Puluh), a position that was supported by other Islamic groups in Java and Sumatra. For many youths, killing communists became a religious duty. Where there had been communist centres in Central and East Java, Muslim groups portraying themselves as victims of communist aggression justified the killings by evoking the Madiun Affair of 1948. Catholic students in the Yogyakarta region left their hostels at night to join in the execution of truckloads of arrested communists.

Although the killings subsided in early 1966 for most of the country, they went on for years in parts of East Java. In Blitar, guerrilla action was maintained by surviving PKI members until they were defeated in 1967 and 1968. The mystic Mbah Suro, along with devotees of his communist-infused traditional mysticism, built a pro-PKI following in Blora Regency, but he and his 80 followers were killed in an operation by the Indonesian Army.

In West Java the battalions of Indonesian forces launched the military operations at Karawang, the operation captured many of the PKI members and sympathisers. by the investigation of the captured PKI members the Indonesian battalions received an information that the Karawang was prepared by the PKI as the centre of PKI activities at West Java by the investigation of Gatot Kotjo (Chairman of Pemuda Rakyat), Mas Mira Subahadi (Candidate of Karawang Regent), and Saidi Sugito (Candidate of Headpolice resorts). Meanwhile, PKI weapons during the 30 September Movement were located at Bekasi Regency.

=== Bali ===
Mirroring the widening of social divisions across Indonesia in the 1950s and early 1960s, the island of Bali saw conflict between supporters of the traditional Balinese caste system and those rejecting these traditional values, particularly the PKI. Communists were publicly accused of working towards destroying the island's culture, religion, and character, and the Balinese, like the Javanese, were urged to destroy the PKI. Government jobs, funds, business advantage and other spoils of office had gone to the communists during the final years of Sukarno's presidency. Disputes over land and tenants' rights led to land seizures and killings when the PKI promoted "unilateral action". As Indonesia's only Hindu-majority island, Bali did not have the Islamic forces involved in Java, and it was upper-caste PNI landlords who instigated the elimination of PKI members. High Hindu priests called for sacrifices to satisfy spirits angered by past sacrilege and social disruption. Balinese Hindu leader Ida Bagus Oka told Hindus: "There can be no doubt [that] the enemies of our revolution are also the cruellest enemies of religion, and must be eliminated and destroyed down to the roots." Like parts of East Java, Bali experienced a state of near civil war as communists regrouped.

The balance of power was shifted in favour of anti-communists in December 1965, when personnel from both the Army Para-commando Regiment and 5th Brawijaya Military Region units arrived in Bali after having carried out killings in Java. Led by Suharto's principal troubleshooter, Colonel Sarwo Edhie Wibowo, Javanese military commanders permitted Balinese squads to kill until reined in. In contrast to Central Java, where the Army encouraged people to kill the "Gestapu", Bali's eagerness to kill was so tremendous and spontaneous that, having provided logistic support initially, the Army eventually had to step in to prevent chaos. Sukarno's choice of Bali's provincial governor, Suteja, was removed from his post and was later accused of planning a communist uprising of Balinese, and his relatives were tracked down and killed. A series of killings similar to those in Central and East Java were led by black-shirted PNI youth. For several months, militia death squads went through villages capturing suspects and taking them away. Hundreds of houses belonging to communists and their relatives were burnt down within one week of the reprisal crusade, with occupants being butchered as they ran from their homes. An early estimate suggested that 50,000 people, including women and children, were killed in this operation alone. The population of several Balinese villages were halved in the last months of 1965. All the Chinese shops in the towns of Singaraja and Denpasar were destroyed, and many of their owners who were alleged to have financially supported the "Gestapu" killed. Between December 1965 and early 1966, an estimated 80,000 Balinese were killed, roughly 5% of the island's population at the time, and proportionally more than anywhere else in Indonesia.

=== Other islands ===
PKI-organised movements and campaigns against foreign businesses in Sumatra's plantations provoked quick reprisals against communists following the coup attempt. In Aceh, as many as 40,000 were killed, part of the possibly 200,000 deaths across Sumatra. Ethnic Javanese migrants were slaughtered en masse in South Sumatra. The regional revolts of the late 1950s complicated events in Sumatra as many former rebels were forced to affiliate themselves with communist organisations to prove their loyalty to the Indonesian Republic. The quelling of the 1950s revolts and 1965 killings were seen by most Sumatrans as a "Javanese occupation". In Lampung, another factor in the killings seems to have been Javanese immigration. In West Kalimantan, after the killings ended in 1967, indigenous pagan Dayaks expelled 45,000 ethnic Chinese from rural areas, killing as many as 2,000 to 5,000. The Chinese refused to fight back since they considered themselves "a guest on other people's land" with the intention of trading only. In Flores, between 800 and 2,000 people were killed, with an estimated death toll of 3,000 people for the whole province of East Nusa Tenggara. Local Catholics were both the main victims and perpetrators of the killings in Flores.

=== Religious and ethnic factors ===
Islam in Java was divided between Abangan, who mixed Islam with other religions like Hinduism and native religious practices, and the Santri, who adhered to Sunni Islam. Many Abangans were supporters of the Communist Party, and thus, their interests were supported by the PKI. They subsequently made up most of the people who were slaughtered in the killings. Abangans were targeted for attacks by Ansor, the youth wing of Nahdlatul Ulama and the Santri with help from the Indonesian Army. To avoid being classified as atheists and communists, Abangan Muslims were forced to convert to Hinduism and Christianity by the Indonesian government in the aftermath of the slaughter.

Ansor also targeted gender minorities, including the Bugis third-gender bissu population, deeming their culture to be against Islam, and the bissu and those who shared their belief system were accused of being communists or PKI members. The heads of some bissu were forcibly shaved, and many of them were reportedly given the option of conforming to exclusively masculine gender roles or they would be killed. Ansor decapitated Sanro Makgangke, a bissu leader in Bone, and publicly displayed their head as a warning to others. In Sumatra, anti-Javanese Sumatran youths massacred the ethnic Javanese plantation labourers and PKI members throughout North Sumatra. In Lombok, natives slaughtered mostly ethnic Balinese all across the region.

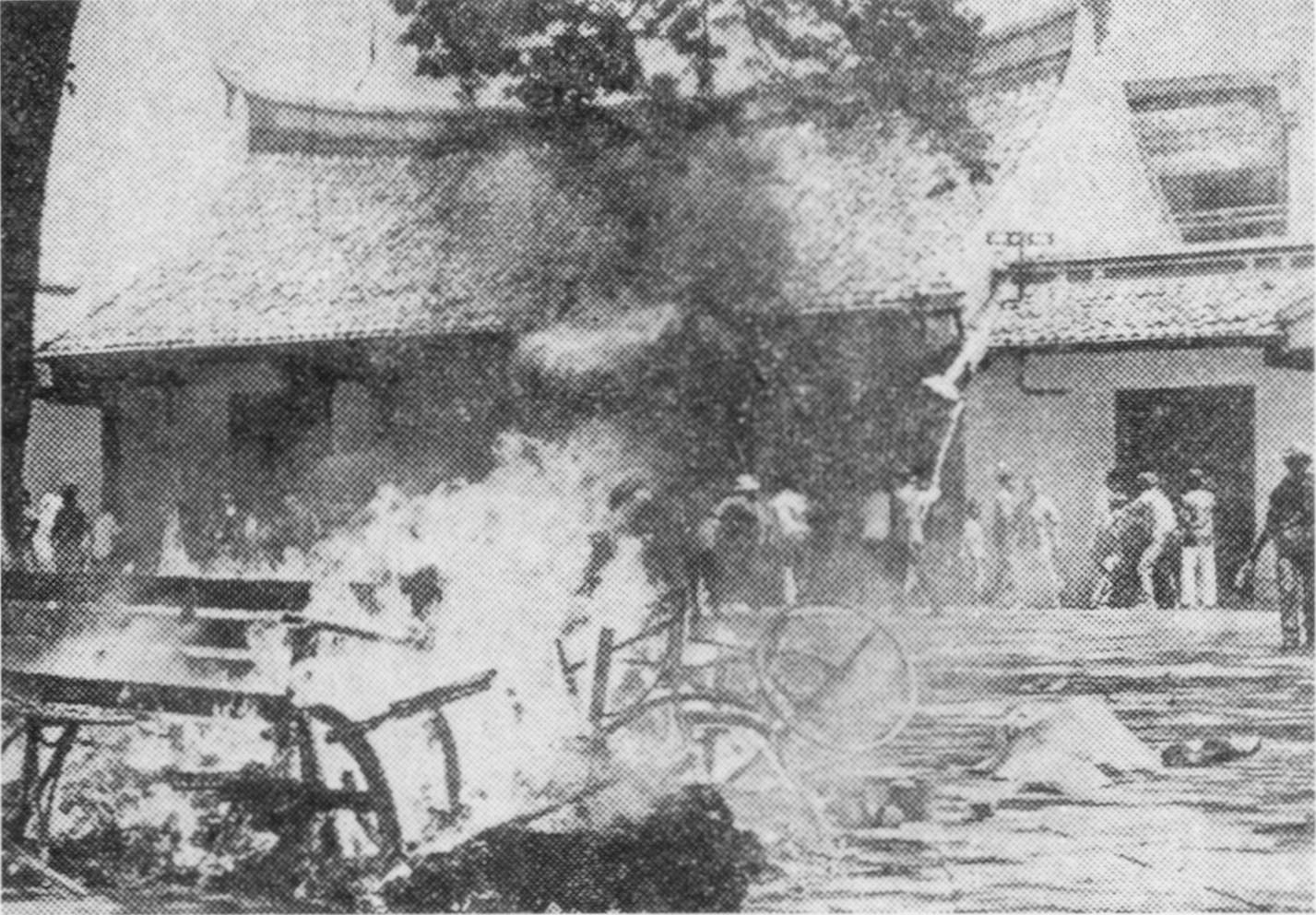
Arson attack against the Chinese embassy to Indonesia

The targeting of ethnic Chinese played an important role in the killings in Sumatra and Kalimantan, which have been called genocide. Charles A. Coppel is sharply critical of this characterisation, in which he sees a western media and academics unwilling to face the consequences of an anti-communist agenda that they endorsed, instead scapegoating Indonesian racism and indulging in extravagant and false claims of hundreds of thousands or millions of Chinese killed. Charles Coppel wrote of the distorted coverage in an article titled: "A genocide that never was: explaining the myth of anti-Chinese massacres in Indonesia, 1965–1966". Coppel sees the same bias in coverage of the May 1998 riots, where the Volunteer Team for Humanity noted non-Chinese looters made up the majority of those who were killed. His thesis continues to inspire debate, most notably in Jess Melvin's analysis of historical documents she uncovered from Army Archives in Indonesia about the massacres of 1965/66 in the province of Aceh ("the Indonesian genocide files"): "These documents provide the first documentary evidence that systematic race-based killings did occur in Aceh during the genocide. [...] while I agree ethnic Chinese who were murdered in Aceh during the time of public and systematic killings (7 October – 23 December 1965) were killed primarily because of their alleged relationship with the PKI, this does not mean race was absent as a motivating factor behind the violence."

An estimate is that around 2,000 Chinese Indonesians were killed (out of a total estimated death toll of between 500,000 and 3 million people), with documented massacres taking place in Makassar, Medan and Lombok island. Robert Cribb and Charles A. Coppel noted that "relatively few" Chinese were actually killed during the purge while most of the dead were native Indonesians. The death toll of the Chinese was in the thousands, while the death toll of native Indonesians was in the hundreds of thousands. Ethnic Balinese and Javanese made up the vast majority of people who were massacred.

In 1967 in West Kalimantan, Dayaks were manipulated by the Indonesian military into massacring the Chinese. The land the Chinese fled from was taken by Dayaks as well as by other groups, including the Madurese, who were later also massacred by the Dayaks.

== Deaths and imprisonment ==
Lt. Col. Untung Syamsuri, participant in the 30 September Movement, being prepared for execution in September 1967

Although the general outline of events is known, much of the information about the killings is unknown, and an accurate and verified count of the dead is unlikely ever to be known. There were few Western journalists or academics in Indonesia at the time; the military was one of the few sources of information, travel was difficult and dangerous, and the regime that approved and oversaw the killings remained in power for three decades. The Indonesian media at the time had been undermined by restrictions under "Guided Democracy" and by the "New Order's" takeover in October 1966. With the killings occurring at the height of Western fears over communism during the Cold War, there was little investigation internationally, which would have risked complicating the West's preference for Suharto and the "New Order" over the PKI and the "Old Order".

In the first 20 years following the killings, 39 serious estimates of the death toll were attempted. Before the killings had finished, the Indonesian Army estimated 78,500 had been killed, while the PKI put the figure at two million. The Indonesian Army later estimated the number killed to be one million. In 1966, Benedict Anderson had set the death toll at 200,000. By 1985 he concluded that a total of 500,000 to 1 million people had been killed. Most scholars now agree that at least half a million were killed, thus more than in any other event in Indonesian history. An armed forces security command estimate from December 1976 put the number at between 450,000 and 500,000. Robert Cribb suggests the most accurate figure is 500,000, though he notes it is incredibly difficult to determine the precise number of people killed. However, Jan Walendouw, one of Suharto's confidants, cited a number of 1.2 million victims. Vincent Bevins estimates the numbers killed at up to a million or perhaps more.

Arrests and imprisonment continued for ten years after the purge. A 1977 Amnesty International report suggested "about one million" PKI cadres and others identified or suspected of party involvement were detained. Between 1981 and 1990, the Indonesian government estimated that there were between 1.6 and 1.8 million former prisoners "at large" in society. It is possible that in the mid-1970s, 100,000 were still imprisoned without trial. It is thought that as many as 1.5 million were imprisoned at one stage or another. Those PKI members not killed or imprisoned went into hiding while others tried to hide their past. Those arrested included leading politicians, artists and writers such as Pramoedya Ananta Toer, and peasants and soldiers.

People who were incarcerated in the vast network of prisons and concentration camps were subjected to "extraordinarily inhumane conditions." Many did not survive this first period of detention, dying from malnutrition and beatings.

As people revealed the names of underground communists, frequently under torture, the number of people who were imprisoned rose from 1966 to 1968. Methods of torture included severe beatings with makeshift materials like electric cables and large pieces of wood, breaking fingers and crushing toes and feet under the legs of tables and chairs, pulling out fingernails, electric shocks, and burning skin with molten rubber or cigarettes. Detainees were sometimes forced to watch or listen to the torture of others, including relatives such as spouses or children. Men and women were both subjected to sexual violence while they were in detention, with methods including rape and electric shocks to their genitals. In particular, women were subjected to brutal gender-based violence; many were forced to ingest the urine of their captors and their genitals and breasts were mutilated. Myriad instances of torture and rape were reported to Amnesty International, including female victims who were younger than 13. People who were released were frequently placed under house arrest and regularly had to report to the military. Or, they were banned from government employment, a ban which was extended to their children.

== Aftermath ==
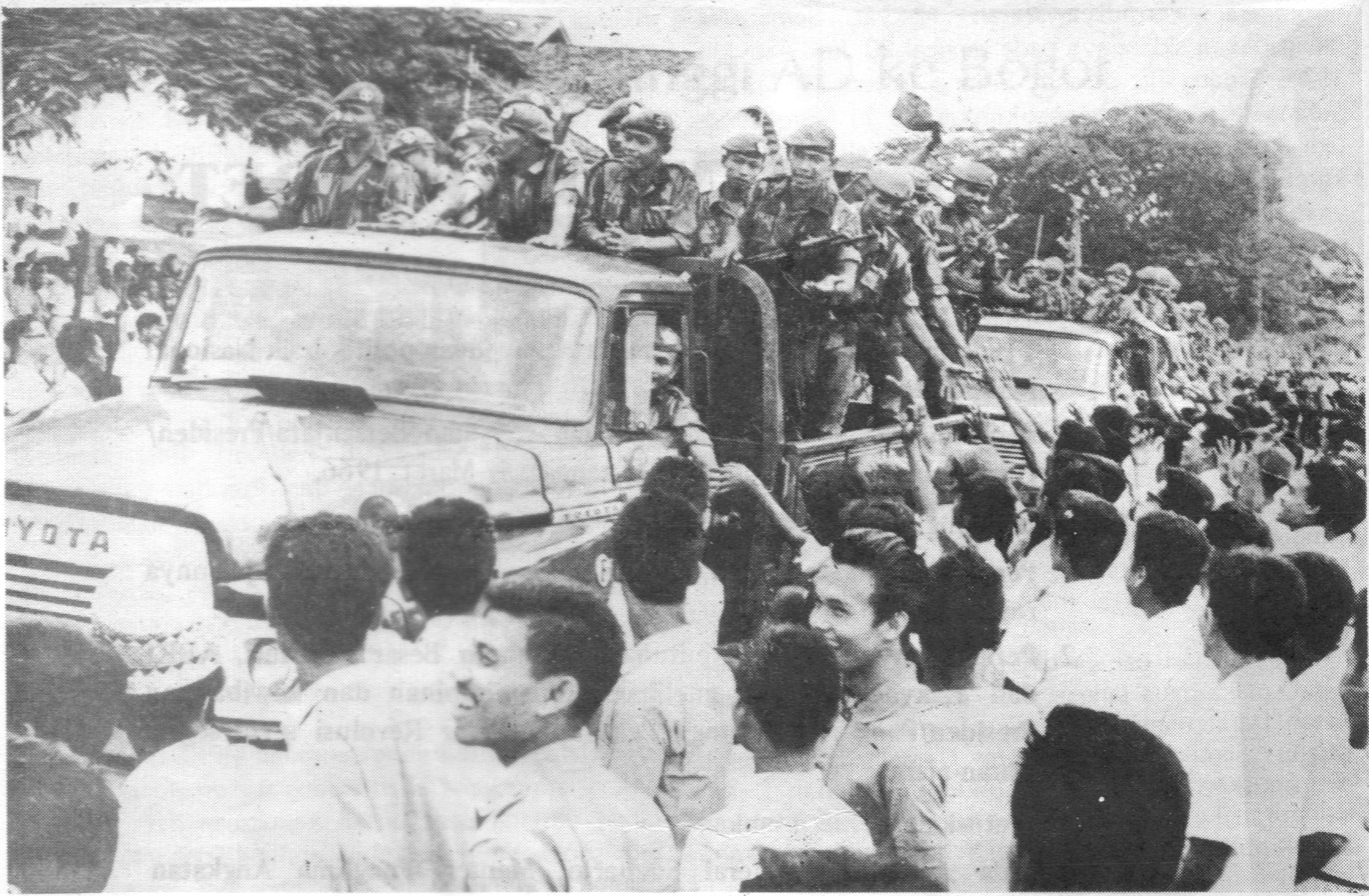
Military parade on 12 March, the day after Supersemar

=== Impact ===
Sukarno's balancing act of "Nasakom" (nationalism, religion, communism) had been unravelled. His most significant pillar of support, the PKI, had been effectively eliminated by the other two pillars—the Army and political Islam; and the Army was on the way to unchallenged power. Many Muslims no longer trusted him, and by early 1966, Suharto began to openly defy Sukarno, a policy that Army leaders had previously avoided. Sukarno attempted to cling to power and mitigate the Army's new-found influence, although he could not bring himself to blame the PKI for the coup as demanded by Suharto. On 1 February 1966, Sukarno promoted Suharto to the rank of lieutenant general. The Supersemar decree of 11 March 1966 transferred much of Sukarno's power over the parliament and Army to Suharto, ostensibly allowing Suharto to do whatever was needed to restore order. On 12 March 1967, Sukarno was stripped of his remaining power by Indonesia's provisional parliament, and Suharto named acting president. On 21 March 1968, the same parliament formally elected Suharto as president.

Several hundred or thousand Indonesian leftists who were travelling abroad were unable to return to their homeland. For example, Djawoto, the ambassador to China, refused to be recalled and spent the rest of his life outside of Indonesia. Some of these exiles, writers by trade, continued writing. This Indonesian exile literature was full of hatred for the new government and written simply, for general consumption, but necessarily published internationally.

In late 1968, the National Intelligence Estimate for Indonesia reported: "An essential part of the Suharto government's economic program ... has been to welcome foreign capital back to Indonesia. Already about 25 American and European firms have recovered control of mines, estates, and other enterprises nationalized under Sukarno. Liberal legislation has been enacted to attract new private foreign investment. ... There is substantial foreign investment in relatively untapped resources of nickel, copper, bauxite, and timber. The most promising industry ... is oil." The killings served as a direct precedent for the genocidal invasion and occupation of East Timor. The same generals oversaw the killing in both situations and encouraged equally brutal methods—with impunity.

The killings in Indonesia were so effective and enjoyed such prestige among Western powers that they inspired similar anti-communist purges in countries such as Chile and Brazil. Vincent Bevins found evidence that indirectly linked the metaphor "Jakarta" to eleven countries.

=== Global reaction ===
To Western governments, the killings and purges were seen as victory over communism at the height of the Cold War. Western governments and much of the West's media preferred Suharto and the "New Order" to the PKI and the increasingly leftist "Old Order". The British ambassador, Andrew Gilchrist, wrote to London: "I never concealed from you my belief that a little shooting in Indonesia would be an essential preliminary to effective change." News of the massacre was carefully controlled by Western intelligence agencies. Journalists, prevented from entering Indonesia, relied on the official statements from Western embassies. The British embassy in Jakarta advised intelligence headquarters in Singapore on how the news should be presented: "Suitable propaganda themes might be: PKI brutality in murdering Generals, ... PKI subverting Indonesia as agents of foreign Communists. ... British participation should be carefully concealed."

A headline in U.S. News & World Report read: "Indonesia: Hope... where there was once none". Australian Prime Minister Harold Holt commented in The New York Times, "With 500,000 to 1 million Communist sympathizers knocked off, I think it is safe to assume a reorientation has taken place." The nationalist oil tycoon H. L. Hunt proclaimed Indonesia the sole bright spot for the United States in the Cold War and called the ouster of Sukarno the "greatest victory for freedom since the last decisive battle of World War II." Time described the suppression of the PKI as "The West's best news for years in Asia," and praised Suharto's regime as "scrupulously constitutional." "It was a triumph for Western propaganda," Robert Challis, a BBC reporter in the area, later reflected. Many Western media reports repeated the Indonesian Army's line by downplaying its responsibility for and the rational, organised nature of the mass killing. They emphasised the role of civilians instead, invoking the orientalist stereotype of Indonesians as primitive and violent. A New York Times journalist wrote an article titled "When a Nation Runs Amok" explaining that the killings were hardly surprising since they occurred in "violent Asia, where life is cheap."

U.S. government officials were "almost uniformly celebratory" of the mass killings. In recalling their attitudes regarding the killings, State Department intelligence officer Howard Federspiel said that "no one cared, as long as they were Communists, that they were being butchered." Within the United States, Robert F. Kennedy was one of the only prominent individuals to condemn the massacres. He said in January 1966: "We have spoken out against the inhuman slaughters perpetrated by the Nazis and the Communists. But will we speak out also against the inhuman slaughter in Indonesia, where over 100,000 alleged Communists have not been perpetrators, but victims?" U.S. economic elites were also pleased with the outcome in Indonesia. Following Suharto's consolidation of power in 1967, many companies, including Freeport Sulphur (see Grasberg mine), Goodyear Tire and Rubber Company, General Electric, American Express, Caterpillar Inc., StarKist, Raytheon Technologies and Lockheed Martin, went to explore business opportunities in the country.

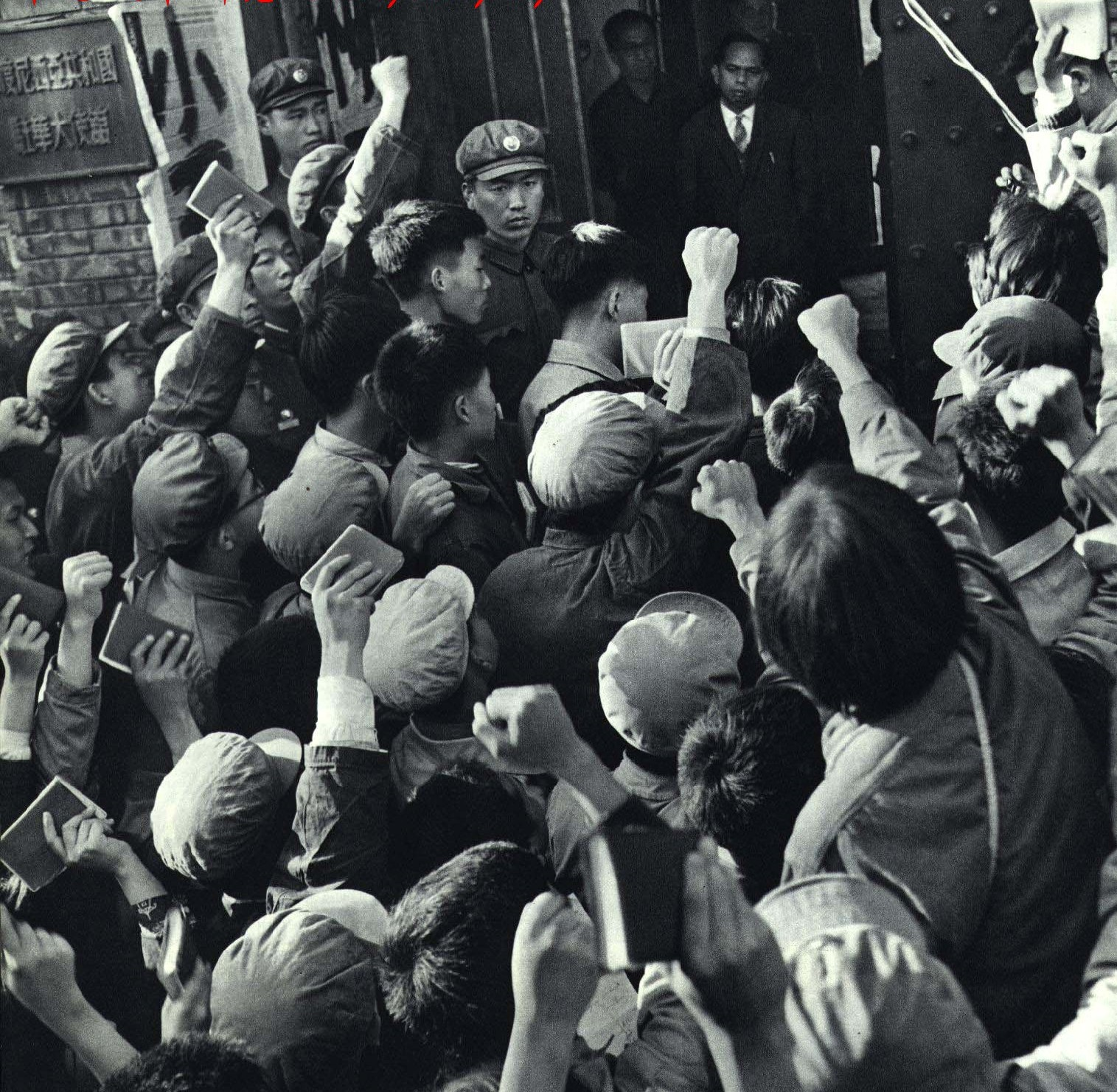
Protest at the Indonesian embassy in Beijing in April 1967 following Suharto's assumption of presidential power

The Soviet physicist Andrei Sakharov called the killings a 'tragic event' and described it as "an extreme case of reaction, racism and militarism", but otherwise, the official Soviet response was relatively muted, likely due to the PKI siding with China in the Sino-Soviet split. Other Communist states issued sharp criticism of the killings. The Chinese government stated they were "heinous and diabolical crimes ... unprecedented in history." China also offered refuge to Indonesian leftists fleeing the violence. One Yugoslav diplomat commented that "even assuming the guilt of the politburo [PKI leadership], which I do not, does this justify genocide? Kill the Central Committee, but do not kill 100,000 people who do not know and had no part in it [the 30 September Plot]." The killings perhaps provided a justification for the Cultural Revolution in China, as Chinese communist leaders were fearful that "hidden bourgeois elements" could infiltrate or destroy leftist movements and organisations, and it was built around this narrative. The Suharto government was condemned as a "military fascist regime" by the government of North Korea.

The United Nations avoided commenting on the killings. When Suharto returned Indonesia to the UN, the People's Socialist Republic of Albania was the only member state to protest.

== Foreign involvement ==
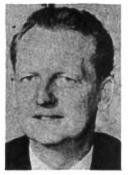
US ambassador to Indonesia Marshall Green was alleged to have approved the supply of names of communists to the Indonesian military

At the time of the killings, the Cold War between the Western powers, in particular, the Cold War between the United States and the communist powers, was at its height. The U.S. government and the rest of the Western Bloc had the goal of halting the spread of communism and bringing countries into its sphere of influence; the eradication of the PKI and Suharto's taking power would be a major turning point in the Cold War. The United Kingdom had an additional, direct, motive to want Sukarno out of power: he opposed the Malayan federation, formed from former states of British Malaya neighbouring Indonesia; since 1963 there had been conflict and armed incursions by the Indonesian army across the border, following communist insurgency from 1948 to 1960 in British Malaya and then independent Commonwealth member Malaya.

Geoffrey B. Robinson, professor of history at UCLA, posits that, based on documentary evidence, powerful foreign states, in particular the United States, the United Kingdom and their allies, were instrumental in facilitating and encouraging the Indonesian Army's campaign of mass killing, and without such support, the killings would not have happened. He elaborates in his 2018 book The Killing Season:

The United States and other Western states have steadfastly denied any responsibility for the terrible violence that followed the alleged coup of October 1, 1965. That violence, they have maintained, was the product of domestic political forces over which outside powers had little, if any, influence. That claim is untrue. There is now clear evidence that in the crucial six months after the alleged coup, Western powers encouraged the army to move forcefully against the Left, facilitated widespread violence including mass killings, and helped to consolidate the political power of the army, In doing so, they helped to bring about the political and physical destruction of the PKI and its affiliates, the removal of Sukarno and his closest associates from political power, their replacement by an army elite led by General Suharto, and a seismic shift in Indonesia's foreign policy towards the West and the capitalist model it advanced.

It really was a big help to the army. They probably killed a lot of people, and I probably have a lot of blood on my hands, but that's not all bad. There's a time when you have to strike hard at a decisive moment.

— Robert J. Martens, political officer at the U.S. Embassy in Jakarta, who provided lists of communists to the Indonesian military.

While the exact role of the U.S. government during the massacres remains obscured by still-sealed government archives on Indonesia for this period, it is known that "at a minimum," the U.S. government supplied money and communications equipment to the Indonesian Army that facilitated the mass killings, gave fifty million rupiah to the KAP-Gestapu death squad, and provided targeted names of thousands of alleged PKI leaders to the Indonesian Army. Robert J. Martens, political officer at the U.S. Embassy in Jakarta from 1963 to 1966, told journalist Kathy Kadane in 1990 that he led a group of State Department and CIA officials who drew up the lists of roughly 5,000 Communist Party operatives, which he provided to an Army intermediary. Kadane asserts that approval for the release of names came from top U.S. Embassy officials, including U.S. Ambassador to Indonesia Marshall Green, deputy chief of mission Jack Lydman and political section chief Edward Masters, who all later denied involvement. Martens claimed he acted without approval to avoid red tape at a critical time. The State Department volume Foreign Relations of the United States, 1964–1968, which the CIA attempted to suppress in 2001, acknowledges that the U.S. Embassy provided lists of communist leaders to Indonesians involved in the purges, and notes that Marshall Green stated in a 1966 airgram to Washington, which was drafted by Martens and approved by Masters, that the lists of communists were "apparently being used by Indonesian security authorities who seem to lack even the simplest overt information on PKI leadership." Scholars have also corroborated the claim that U.S. Embassy officials provided lists of communists to Suharto's forces, who, according to Mark Aarons, "ensured that those so named were eliminated in the mass killing operations." Geoffrey B. Robinson asserts that U.S. government officials, among them Marshall Green, "published memoirs and articles that sought to divert attention from any possible U.S. role, while questioning the integrity and political loyalties of scholars who disagreed with them."

Vincent Bevins writes that this was not the first instance of U.S. officials providing lists of suspected communists to members of a foreign government to be rounded up and killed, as they had done so in Guatemala in 1954 and Iraq in 1963. Besides U.S. officials, managers of U.S.-owned corporate plantations also provided the Indonesian Army with lists of "troublesome" communists and union leaders who were subsequently hunted down and killed.

Robert Cribb, writing in 2002, claims "there is considerable evidence that the U.S. encouraged the killings, by both providing funds to anti-communist forces and supplying the Indonesian Army with the names of people whom it believed were PKI members. There is no evidence, however, that U.S. intervention significantly increased the scale of the killings." Vincent Bevins says that the Indonesian military bears "prime responsibility for the massacres and concentration camps," but adds that "Washington was the prime mover" of the operation and "shares guilt for every death." Mark Aarons contends that Marshall Green is "long seen as one of the principal officials involved in encouraging the slaughter." Kai Thaler asserts that declassified documents show that "U.S. officials were accessories to this mass murder" and "helped create the conditions for the killings." Bradley Simpson, Director of the Indonesia/East Timor Documentation Project at the National Security Archive, contends that "Washington did everything in its power to encourage and facilitate the Army-led massacre of alleged PKI members, and U.S. officials worried only that the killing of the party's unarmed supporters might not go far enough, permitting Sukarno to return to power and frustrate the Johnson administration's emerging plans for a post-Sukarno Indonesia." He claims that documents show "the United States was directly involved to the extent that they provided the Indonesian Armed Forces with assistance that they introduced to help facilitate the mass killings," which included the CIA providing small arms from Thailand, and the U.S. government providing monetary assistance and limited amounts of communications equipment, medicine and a range of other items, including shoes and uniforms, to the Indonesian military.

Western support for the Indonesian Army solidified as it demonstrated its "resolve" through the mass killing campaigns. U.S. President Lyndon B. Johnson's National Security Advisor McGeorge Bundy reported to the president that the events since 1 October had been "a striking vindication of U.S. policy towards Indonesia in recent years: a policy of keeping our hand in the game for the long-term stakes despite recurrent pressure to pull out" and that it was made clear to the Indonesian Army via U.S. Embassy's deputy chief of mission, Francis Joseph Galbraith, that "Embassy and the USG generally sympathetic with and admiring of what Army doing." The primary concerns of U.S. officials by December 1965 were that Sukarno had yet to be removed and that plans to nationalise U.S. oil companies had yet to be reversed and warned the emerging Indonesian leadership that Washington would withhold support if threats to U.S. investments were not halted. Professor Ruth Blakeley writes "the case of Indonesia reveals the extent to which the U.S. state prioritised its elite interests over the human rights of hundreds of thousands of Indonesians."

The United States, along with the United Kingdom and Australia, also played an active role in "black propaganda operations" during the killings, which included clandestine radio broadcasts being transmitted into the country that repeated Indonesian Army propaganda as part of a psychological warfare campaign designed to encourage support for the killings and to discredit the PKI. British Foreign Office documents declassified in 2021 revealed that British propagandists secretly incited anti-communists including army generals to eliminate the PKI, and used black propaganda, due to Sukarno's hostility to the formation of former British colonies into the Malayan federation from 1963. Harold Wilson's government had instructed propaganda specialists from the Foreign Office to send hundreds of inflammatory pamphlets to leading anti-communists in Indonesia, inciting them to kill the foreign minister, Subandrio, and claiming that ethnic Chinese Indonesians deserved the violence which was meted out to them.

Of all countries, Swedish arms supplies seem to have been the most substantial. According to a report by an Indonesian refugee in Japan, from early December 1965, Indonesia signed "a contract with Sweden for an emergency purchase of $10,000,000 worth of small arms and ammunition to be used for annihilating elements of the PKI." The Swedish Embassy's concerns about the slaughter did grow some months later, with Sweden's ambassador openly critical of the campaign of violence, but apparently after the fact.

Documentary filmmaker Joshua Oppenheimer, director of The Act of Killing (2012) and The Look of Silence (2014), called on the U.S. to account for its role in the killings during a screening of the former for U.S. Congress members. On 10 December 2014, the same day The Look of Silence was released in Indonesia, Senator Tom Udall introduced a "Sense of the Senate Resolution" which condemned the killings and called for the declassification of all documents on U.S. involvement in the events, noting that "the U.S. provided financial and military assistance during this time and later, according to documents released by the State Department."

Declassified documents released by the U.S. Embassy in Jakarta in October 2017 show that the U.S. government had detailed knowledge of the massacres from the start and specifically refer to mass killings ordered by Suharto. The documents also reveal that the U.S. government actively encouraged and facilitated the Indonesian Army's massacres to further its geopolitical interests in the region and that U.S. officials and diplomats at the embassy kept detailed records of which PKI leaders were being killed. U.S. officials, dismayed at Indonesia's shift towards the left, were "ecstatic" over the seizure of power by right-wing generals who proceeded to exterminate the PKI, and were determined to avoid doing anything that might thwart the efforts of the Indonesian Army. The U.S. also withheld credible information which contradicted the Indonesian Army's version of events regarding the abortive coup by junior officers on 30 September 1965, which triggered the killings. On 21 December 1965, the Embassy's first secretary, Mary Vance Trent, sent a cable to the State Department which provided an estimate of 100,000 people killed, and referred to the events as a "fantastic switch which has occurred over 10 short weeks." Bradley Simpson said these previously secret cables, telegrams, letters, and reports "contain damning details that the U.S. was willfully and gleefully pushing for the mass murder of innocent people."

=== British psyops ===
The role of the Foreign Office and MI6 intelligence service of United Kingdom, then Indonesia's colonial neighbor on the island of Borneo, has also come to light, in a series of exposés by Paul Lashmar and James Oliver in The Independent newspaper in December 1998, as well as their book, Britain's Secret Propaganda War.

The revelations included an anonymous Foreign Office source stating that the decision to unseat President Sukarno was made by Prime Minister Harold Macmillan then executed under Prime Minister Harold Wilson. According to the exposés, the United Kingdom had already become alarmed with the announcement of the Konfrontasi policy. It has been claimed that a CIA memorandum of 1962 indicated that Prime Minister Macmillan and President John F. Kennedy were increasingly alarmed by the possibility of the confrontation with Malaysia spreading, and agreed to "liquidate President Sukarno, depending on the situation and available opportunities." However, the documentary evidence does not support this claim.

To weaken the regime, the Foreign Office's Information Research Department (IRD) coordinated psychological operations in concert with the British military, to spread black propaganda casting the Communist Party of Indonesia (PKI), Chinese Indonesians, and Sukarno in a bad light. These efforts were to duplicate the successes of British Psyop campaign in the Malayan Emergency.

Of note, these efforts were coordinated from the British High Commission in Singapore where the British Broadcasting Corporation (BBC), Associated Press (AP), and The New York Times filed their reports on the Indonesian turmoil. According to Roland Challis, the BBC correspondent who was in Singapore at the time, journalists were open to manipulation by IRD because of Sukarno's stubborn refusal to allow them into the country: "In a curious way, by keeping correspondents out of the country Sukarno made them the victims of official channels, because almost the only information you could get was from the British ambassador in Jakarta."

These manipulations included the BBC reporting that communists were planning to slaughter the citizens of Jakarta. The accusation was based solely on a forgery planted by Norman Reddaway, a propaganda expert with the IRD. He later bragged in a letter to the British ambassador in Jakarta, Sir Andrew Gilchrist that it "went all over the world and back again," and was "put almost instantly back into Indonesia via the BBC." Gilchrist himself informed the Foreign Office on 5 October 1965: "I have never concealed from you my belief that a little shooting in Indonesia would be an essential preliminary to effective change."

In April 2000, Sir Denis Healey, Secretary of State for Defence at the time of the war, confirmed to The Independent that the IRD was active during this time. He officially denied any role by MI6, and denied "personal knowledge" of the British arming the right-wing faction of the Army, though he did comment that if there were such a plan, he "would certainly have supported it."

Although MI6 is strongly implicated in this scheme by its use of the Information Research Department (seen as an MI6 office), any role by MI6 itself is officially denied by the UK government, and papers relating to it had yet to be declassified by the Cabinet Office. (The Independent, 6 December 2000)

Upon declassification, the documents were used to contend that the British had supported the slaughter and that this was done in three ways: encouragement of the killing; giving the Indonesian military a free hand by furnishing assurances that there would be no British intervention while PKI was being crushed; and propaganda operations.

In October 2021, further light was shed on the United Kingdom's role when declassified documents revealed that the government had covertly deployed black propaganda in order to urge prominent Indonesians to "cut out [the] communist cancer". As the atrocities began in October 1965, British spooks called for "the PKI and all communist organisations [to] be eliminated". The nation, they warned, would be in danger "as long as the communist leaders are at large and their rank and file are allowed to go unpunished".

== Legacy ==
=== Historiography ===
"Almost overnight, the Indonesian government went from being a fierce voice for cold war neutrality and anti-imperialism to a quiet, compliant partner of the US world order".

— John Roosa, Department of History, University of British Columbia

Discussion of the killings was heavily tabooed in Indonesia and, if mentioned at all, usually called peristiwa enam lima, the incident of '65. Inside and outside Indonesia, public discussion of the killings increased during the 1990s and especially after 1998 when the New Order government collapsed. Jailed and exiled members of the Sukarno regime, as well as ordinary people, told their stories in increasing numbers. Foreign researchers began to publish increasingly more on the topic, with the end of the military regime and its doctrine of coercing such research attempts into futility.

The killings are skipped over in most Indonesian histories and have been scarcely examined by Indonesians, and have received comparatively little international attention. Indonesian textbooks typically depict the killings as a "patriotic campaign" that resulted in less than 80,000 deaths. In 2004, the textbooks were briefly changed to include the events, but this new curriculum was discontinued in 2006 following protests from the military and Islamic groups. The textbooks which mentioned the mass killings were subsequently burnt by order of Indonesia's Attorney General. John Roosa's Pretext for Mass Murder (2006) was initially banned by the Attorney General's Office. The Indonesian parliament set up a truth and reconciliation commission to analyse the killings, but it was suspended by the Supreme Court of Indonesia. An academic conference regarding the killings was held in Singapore in 2009. A hesitant search for mass graves by survivors and family members began after 1998, although little has been found. Over three decades later, great enmity remains in Indonesian society over the events.

The Supardjo Document is a copy of the personal notes of General Supardjo regarding the 30 September Movement. It is one of the few primary sources of this event and gives insight into the movement from a military perspective, including Supardjo's opinion on what may have caused the movement to fail.

Satisfactory explanations for the scale and frenzy of the violence have challenged scholars from all ideological perspectives. One view attributes the communal hatred behind the killings to the forcing of parliamentary democracy onto Indonesian society, claiming that such changes were culturally unsuitable and unnecessarily disruptive in the post-independence 1950s. A contrasting view is that when Sukarno and the military replaced the democratic process with authoritarianism, competing interests—i.e., the Army, political Islam, and Communism—could not be openly debated. They were suppressed instead and could only be expressed through violence. A breakdown in conflict resolution methods led to Muslim groups and the military adopting an "us or them attitude" and when the killings were over, many Indonesians dismissed the event as something the communists had deserved. The possibility of returning to similar upheavals was cited as a factor in the New Order administration's political conservatism and tight control of the political system. Vigilance against an alleged communist threat remained a hallmark of Suharto's three-decade presidency.

Although they were mostly unknown in the West compared to the Vietnam War and various right-wing coups in Latin America, the massacres and Suharto's rise to power are considered by historians to be a significant turning point in the Cold War. The massacres were also crucial to the expansion of capitalism in Indonesia, with Suharto rapidly implementing economic policies that his administration modeled on those of the "Berkeley Mafia" to liberalise the economy. Given U.S. foreign policy goals of stopping the spread of communism and bringing nations into its sphere of influence, the bloody purge which decimated the PKI, the third-largest Communist Party in the world at the time, was considered a huge victory. After viewing declassified documents released in 2017, historian John Roosa notes that much "of the U.S. foreign policy establishment viewed it as a great victory that they were able to sort of 'flip' Indonesia very quickly." He also states that the U.S. did not simply "stand by" and allow the killings to happen, claiming that "it's easy for American commentators to fall into that approach, but the U.S. was part and parcel of the operation, strategising with the Indonesian Army and encouraging them to go after the PKI."

In surveying the most recent histories of the events, along with declassified documents and witness statements, Vincent Bevins posits that the mass killings in mid-1960s Indonesia were not necessarily an isolated incident and serves as the apex of "a loose network of U.S.-backed anti-communist extermination programs" which emerged around the world from 1945 to 1990 (such as Operation Condor), and "carried out mass murder in at least 22 countries." He argues that, unlike the violence unleashed by communist leaders such as Joseph Stalin and Pol Pot, the violence of the anti-communist crusade of the United States has deeply shaped the world we live in today, a "worldwide capitalist order with the United States as its leading military power and center of cultural production." He argues that contrary to the popular notion that much of the developing world peacefully and willingly adopted the capitalist system advocated by the United States and its allies, it's possible that without this violence, "many of these countries would not be capitalist at all."

Geoffrey B. Robinson asserts that while there is no consensus on the matter, some scholars have described the mass killings as "genocide". Jess Melvin claims the 1965–1966 massacre constitutes genocide under the legal definition as particular religious and ethnic groups were targeted collectively for their relations to the PKI. She cites Matthew Lippman and David Nersessian stating atheists are covered under the genocide convention and argues the Indonesian military prescribed the elimination of "atheists" and "unbelievers" collectively for their association with communism and the PKI, and thus these killings would constitute genocide. Melvin also asserts that the extermination of the PKI was an act of genocide by pointing out that the PKI themselves identified with a particular religious denomination known as "Red Islam" that mixed Islam with communism. She further argues the killings constitute genocide, rather than politicide, "because the PKI constitute an ideologically-based national group." This interpretation has been rejected by other scholars on the grounds that the United Nations definition of genocide does not mention the targeting of political groups. Historian Charles Coppel argues that the killings were politicide rather than genocide, because the victims "were overwhelmingly Javanese and Balinese, not Chinese".

In January 2024, President Joko Widodo acknowledged human rights violations committed during the mass killings that took place, being the second president to do so after Abdurrahman Wahid made an apology in 2000.

=== International People's Tribunal 1965 ===
In November 2015, the International People's Tribunal on 1965 Crimes Against Humanity in Indonesia, presided over by seven international judges, was held in The Hague, Netherlands. It was formally established in 2014 by human rights activists, academics, and Indonesian exiles in response to an "absence of an official domestic process of transitional justice based on truth finding." In July 2016, chief judge Zak Yacoob publicly read the tribunal's findings, which called the state of Indonesia directly responsible for the events and guilty of crimes against humanity, blamed Suharto for spreading false propaganda and laying the grounds for the massacres, and concluded that the massacres "intended to annihilate a section of the population and could be categorised as genocide"; the report also highlighted other allegations which the panel found to be well-founded, including enslavement in labour camps, ruthless torture, systematic sexual violence, and forced disappearance. Indonesia rejected the tribunal's ruling; Security Minister Luhut Pandjaitan said the killings were "none of their business, they are not our superiors and Indonesia has its own system." The court has no legal authority to issue binding decisions or rulings.

Judge Yacoob stated that "the United States of America, the United Kingdom and Australia were all complicit to differing degrees in the commission of these crimes against humanity." The judges concluded that the U.S. supported the Indonesian military "knowing well that they were embarked upon a programme of mass killings", which included providing lists of alleged Communist Party officials to the Indonesian security forces with a "strong presumption that these would facilitate the arrest and/or the execution of those that were named", whereas the UK and Australia repeated false propaganda from the Indonesian Army, even after it became "abundantly clear that killings and other crimes against humanity were taking place." Australia's foreign affairs ministry rejected the tribunal's conclusion, which it described as a "human rights NGO", and denies the country was in any way complicit in the killings. The U.S. and the U.K. have not responded to the tribunal's findings. Indonesian human-rights lawyer Nursyahbani Katjasungkana called on all three countries to admit their complicity, stating that it had been proved from their various diplomatic communications and could no longer be denied.

=== Films, documentaries, and museums ===
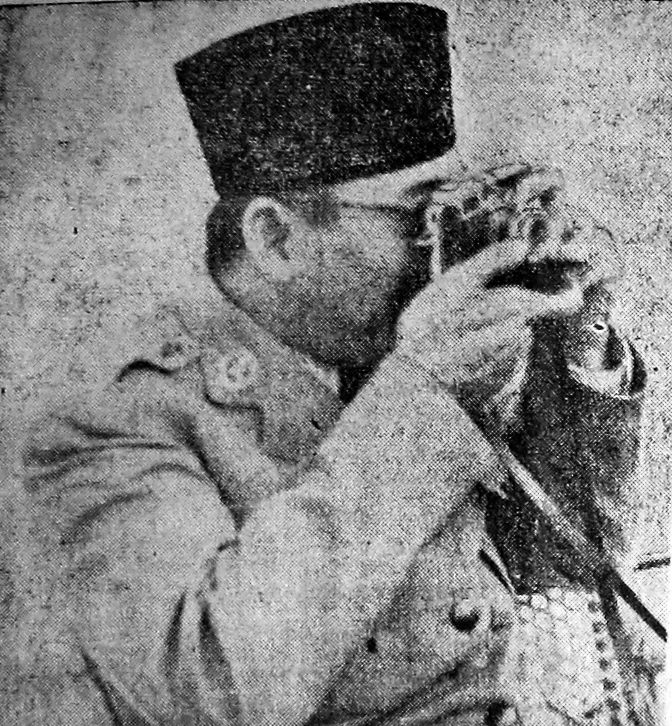
Sukarno filming

During the New Order period, the media was heavily influenced and censored to show a 'certain' history of the 1965 incident: a history which purely and undoubtedly blamed the PKI for this political tragedy. However, in recent articles such as by The Jakarta Post, a more in-depth and complex story is recognised by the media offering conflicting views on whom the blame should really fall. A film supporting the New Order's version of events, Pengkhianatan G30S/PKI (Betrayal by the Communist Party of Indonesia) was broadcast annually on the government television station TVRI every 30 September. This version was the only one allowed in open discourse in the country. After Suharto's removal from power, many people, including those involved, told other versions of the events in various books and films. One, the documentary film The Act of Killing, included interviews with individuals who had participated in the mass killings, and its companion piece The Look of Silence follows one grieving family trying to understand why it happened and exposes how those behind the massacres still revel in their crimes 50 years on, including boasting on camera how they dismembered, eviscerated, castrated and beheaded alleged communists.

We shoved wood in their anus until they died. We crushed their necks with wood. We hung them. We strangled them with wire. We cut off their heads. We ran them over with cars. We were allowed to do it. And the proof is, we murdered people and were never punished.

— Adi Zulkadry, death squad leader quoted in The Act of Killing.

The film The Year of Living Dangerously, based around events leading up to the killings, internationally released in 1982, was banned in Indonesia until 2000.

A museum called the Museum Pengkhianatan PKI (Komunis), the "Museum of Communist Betrayal", was established in Jakarta to buttress the narrative that the PKI were traitors and deserved to be eradicated.

=== Books and novels ===
The killings inspired many novelists to write their own rendition of the event, either on a more local, socio-cultural level, or on a national, political level. Books that were written in Indonesia during the New Order often faced censorship of certain concepts, while books written and published abroad were banned from the country.

John Roosa's Pretext for Mass Murder traces a historical path through the 1965 event, painting a scenario of explanations for what preceded, caused and followed the coup. It focuses on several aspects of the coup such as the incoherence of facts and the incompetence of coup organisers to provide four main interpretations of the coup:(1) the movement as an attempted coup d'état by the PKI, (2) the movement as a mutiny of junior officers, (3) the movement as an alliance of Army officers and the PKI, and (4) the movement as a frame-up of the PKI. It also looks at material previously left unexplored in traditional discussions of the incident to give a reconstruction of the chaos that surrounds this period in Indonesian history.

Ahmad Tohari's trilogy novel The Dancer (Ronggeng Dukuh Paruk) depicts a village community caught in a revolution, giving readers a perspective less acknowledged in the more popular account of the massacres. By having its two main characters, Srintil and Rasus, on opposite ends of the revolution, the novel sketches not only the circumstances that could have drawn the greater rural public into communist practices but also the mindset of the people who were tasked with carrying out the killings. As the novel was published in 1981, certain aspects were censored by the New Order, but all the same, the trilogy provides valuable insight into the grass-root level of the anti-communist coup and the tragedies that followed.

The nights at the beginning of the dry season of 1966 were very cold, and there was widespread anxiety amongst the people. Wild dogs roamed the area, savage, aroused by the smell of blood and corpses that had not been buried properly. The southeasterly breeze carried the smell of rotting carrion. The stillness of the nights was broken by the sounds of the heavy footfalls of boots and the occasional reports of gunshots.

— Ahmad Tohari in his novel The Dancer

Eka Kurniawan's Beauty is a Wound (2002) weaves history into satire, tragedy and the supernatural to depict the state of the nation before, during and after 1965. There is less focus on the military aspect of the coup, but a good deal of focus on the communists themselves through the form of interpersonal relationships and communist ghosts who could not find peace. Without meaning to, perhaps, the novel also gives readers a glimpse of the economy of Indonesia at the time using the example of a flourishing prostitute business and a temporary swimsuit business, among others. Kurniawan projects his feelings about the revolution and coup by constructing a story of theatrical characters around it and delivers a history of the nation all the way from Dutch occupation to Suharto.

Revolution is nothing more than a collective running amok, organized by one particular party.

— Eka Kurniawan in his novel, Beauty is a Wound

Louise Doughty's Black Water (2016) deals with the 1965 event by exploring them from a European viewpoint. Shifting between California and Indonesia as settings for the novel, the book is written from the perspective of a single man working as an operative for an international company. The novel focuses more on foreign reactions to the coup rather than the coup itself, especially from the foreign journalist community.

The Jakarta Method (2020) by Vincent Bevins builds upon his writing for The Washington Post employing recently declassified records, archival probes, and primary eye-witness interviews gathered from one dozen countries to further examine and bring to greater public acknowledgement of the legacy of the killings.

== See also ==
- 1740 Batavia massacre
- 1918 Kudus riot
- 40 Years of Silence: An Indonesian Tragedy, a 2009 documentary film
- Anti-communist mass killings
- Banjarmasin riot of May 1997
- Communism in Sumatra
- Gerwani
- Human rights in Indonesia
- Indonesian invasion of East Timor
- Indonesian occupation of East Timor
- East Timor genocide
- List of massacres in Indonesia
- May 1998 Indonesia riots
- Mergosono massacre (1947)
- Papua conflict
- Petrus killings
- Political cleansing of population
- Politics of Indonesia
- United States and state terrorism
- United States and state-sponsored terrorism
- United States atrocity crimes
- United States involvement in regime change

== References and further reading ==
- Alham, Asahan, ed. (2002). Di Negeri Orang: Puisi Penyair Indonesia Eksil [In Another Person's Country: Poems By Exiled Indonesian Poets] (in Indonesian). Jakarta: Lontar Foundation. ISBN 978-979-8083-42-6.
- Allan, Stuart; Zeilzer, Barbie (2004). Reporting War: Journalism in Wartime. London and New York: Routledge.
- Bellamy, Alex J. (2012). Massacres and Morality: Mass Atrocities in an Age of Civilian Immunity. Oxford University Press. ISBN 0-19-928842-9.
- Bevins, Vincent (2020). The Jakarta Method: Washington's Anticommunist Crusade and the Mass Murder Program that Shaped Our World. PublicAffairs. ISBN 978-1-5417-4240-6.
- Blakeley, Ruth (2009). State Terrorism and Neoliberalism: The North in the South. Routledge. ISBN 0-415-68617-2
- Blumenthal, David A. and McCormack, Timothy L. H. (2007). The Legacy of Nuremberg: Civilising Influence or Institutionalised Vengeance? (International Humanitarian Law). Martinus Nijhoff Publishers. ISBN 90-04-15691-7
- Crouch, Harold (1978). The army and politics in Indonesia, Ithaca, NY: Cornell University Press ISBN 0-8014-1155-6 (A revision of the author's thesis, Monash University, Melbourne, 1975, titled The Indonesia Army in politics, 1960–1971.) pp. 65–66. Cited in Cribb (1990).
- Cribb, Robert (1990), "Introduction: Problems in the historiography of the killings in Indonesia", in Cribb, Robert (ed.), Monash papers on Southeast Asia – No 21. The Indonesian killings of 1965–1966: studies from Java and Bali, Clayton, VIC: Monash University, Centre of Southeast Asian Studies, pp. 1–43
- Cribb, Robert; Coppel, Charles (2009). "A genocide that never was: explaining the myth of anti-Chinese massacres in Indonesia, 1965–66". Journal of Genocide Research. 11 (4). Taylor & Francis: 447–465. doi:10.1080/14623520903309503. ISSN 1469-9494. S2CID 145011789.
- Curtis, Mark (2003), Web of Deceit: Britain's Real Role in the World, London: Vintage, ISBN 978-0-099-44839-6
- Friend, T. (2003). Indonesian Destinies. Harvard University Press. ISBN 0-674-01137-6.
- Gerlach, Christian; Six, Clemens, eds. (2020). The Palgrave Handbook of Anti-Communist Persecutions. Palgrave Macmillan. ISBN 978-3-030-54965-7.
- Hill, David (2008). Knowing Indonesia from Afar: Indonesian Exiles and Australian Academics (PDF) (Paper delivered at the 17th Biennial Conference on the Asian Studies Association of Australia). Archived from the original (PDF) on 27 March 2012.
- Hindley, Donald. The Communist Party of Indonesia, 1951–1963 (University of California Press, 1966).
- McDonald, Hamish (1980). Suharto's Indonesia. Melbourne: Fontana Books. ISBN 0-00-635721-0.
- McGregor, Katharine; Melvin, Jess; Pohlman, Annie, eds. (2018). The Indonesian Genocide of 1965: Causes, Dynamics and Legacies (Palgrave Studies in the History of Genocide). Palgrave Macmillan. doi:10.1007/978-3-319-71455-4. ISBN 978-3-319-71454-7.
- Mehr, Nathaniel (2009). Constructive Bloodbath in Indonesia: The United States, Great Britain and the Mass Killings of 1965–1966. Spokesman Books. ISBN 0-85124-767-9
- Melvin, Jess (2018). The Army and the Indonesian Genocide: Mechanics of Mass Murder. Routledge. ISBN 978-1-138-57469-4.
- Oey Hong Lee, (1971) Indonesian government and press during Guided Democracy Hull: University of Hull, Hull monographs on South-East Asia; no. 4. Zug, Switzerland: Inter Documentation Co.
- Ricklefs, M. C. (1991). A History of Modern Indonesia since c.1300, Second Edition. MacMillan. ISBN 0-333-57689-6.
- Robinson, Geoffrey (1995). The Dark Side of Paradise: Political Violence in Bali. Ithaca: Cornell University Press. pp. Chapter 11. cited here from Friend (2003).
- Robinson, Geoffrey B. (2018). The Killing Season: A History of the Indonesian Massacres, 1965–66. Princeton University Press. ISBN 978-1-4008-8886-3.
- Roosa, John (2006). Pretext for Mass Murder: The September 30th Movement and Suharto's Coup d'État in Indonesia. Madison, WI: University of Wisconsin Press. ISBN 978-0-299-22034-1.
- Roosa, John (2020). Buried Histories: The Anticommunist Massacres of 1965–1966 in Indonesia. University of Wisconsin Press. ISBN 978-0-299-32730-9.
- Schaefer, Bernd; Wardaya, Baskara T., eds. (2013), 1965: Indonesia and the World, Jakarta: Gramedia Pustaka Utama, ISBN 978-9-792-29872-7
- Schwarz, A. (1994). A Nation in Waiting: Indonesia in the 1990s. Westview Press. ISBN 1-86373-635-2.
- Simpson, Bradley (2010). Economists with Guns: Authoritarian Development and U.S.–Indonesian Relations, 1960–1968. Stanford University Press. ISBN 0-8047-7182-0
- Tan, Mely G. (2008). Etnis Tionghoa di Indonesia: Kumpulan Tulisan [Ethnic Chinese in Indonesia: A Collection of Writings] (in Indonesian). Jakarta: Yayasan Obor Indonesia. ISBN 978-979-461-689-5.
- Taylor, Jean Gelman (2003). Indonesia: Peoples and Histories. New Haven and London: Yale University Press. ISBN 0-300-10518-5.
- Vickers, Adrian (2005). A History of Modern Indonesia. Cambridge University Press. ISBN 0-521-54262-6.
- Vickers, Adrian (1995), From Eric Oey, ed. (1995). Bali. Singapore: Periplus Editions. pp. 26–35. ISBN 962-593-028-0.
- Vittachi, Tarzie (1967). The Fall of Sukarno. Andre Deutsch Ltd.
- Weiner, Tim (2007). Legacy of Ashes – The History of the CIA. Penguin Books. ISBN 978-1-84614-064-8.
- Westad, Odd Arne (2005). The Global Cold War: Third World Interventions and the Making of Our Times. Cambridge: Cambridge University Press. ISBN 978-1-139-64382-5.
