= Charles Coppel =

Australian historian and former barrister

Charles Antony Coppel (born in 1937 in Melbourne) is an Australian historian and former barrister.

Coppel became a barrister for five years after completing his degree in law from the University of Melbourne. He received his doctorate in political science from Monash University in 1975 with a dissertation titled Indonesian Chinese in Crisis. Coppel's dissertation was published in 1983 and became one of the most widely read titles on Chinese Indonesian politics.

== Personal life ==
Charles Coppel is the son of the late Dr Elias Godfrey Coppel QC and Marjorie Jean Coppel. Charles lives in Melbourne and is married to Suzy Nixon. He was previously married to Tania Coppel. Charles has three children, Louisa, Patrick and Len, and a granddaughter Zara.
