= Mustafa Soepardjo =

Indonesian military officer

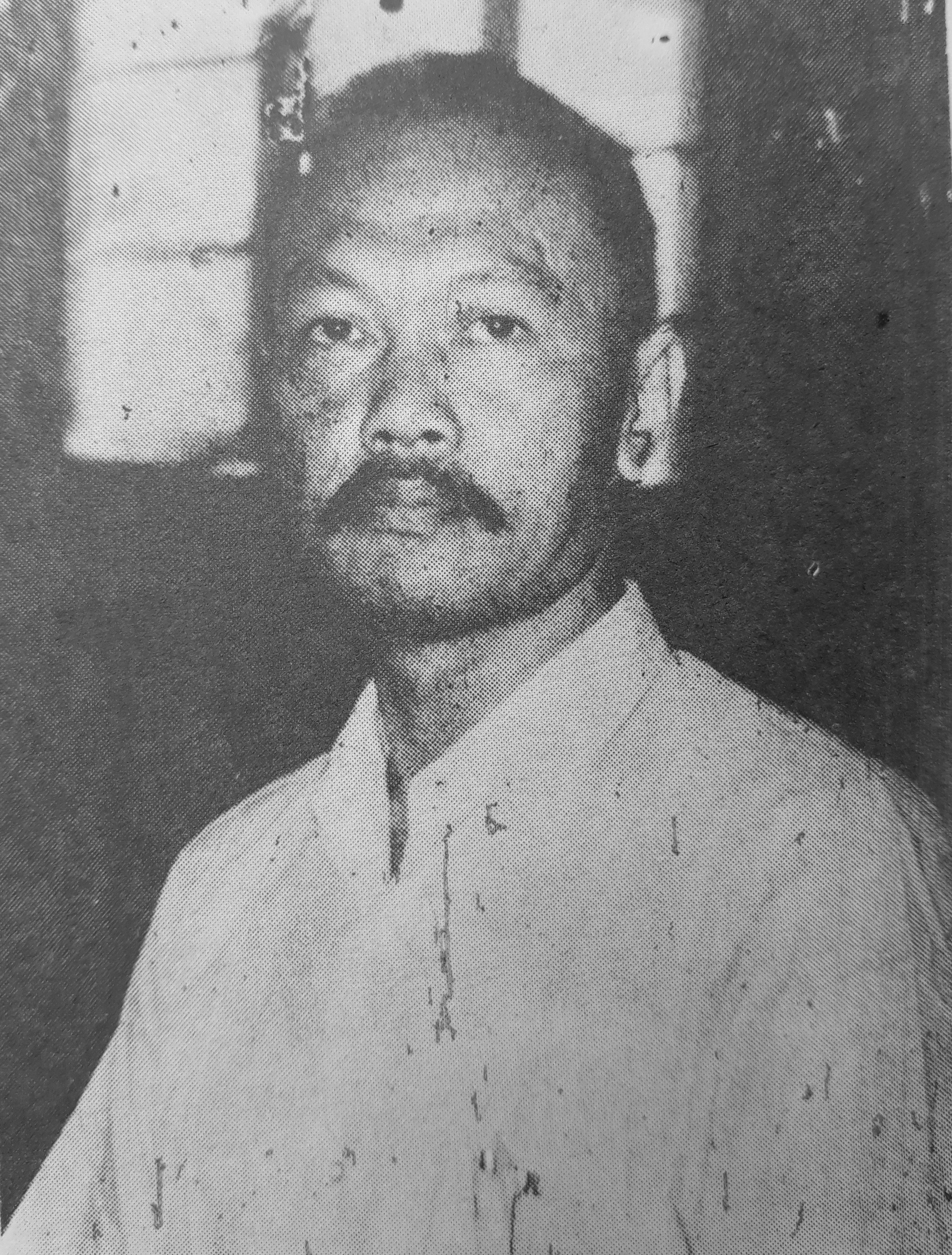
Brig. Gen. Soepardjo

Mustafa Sjarief Soepardjo (EYD: Mustafa Syarief Suparjo; 23 March 1923 – 16 May 1970), also known as Supardjo, was a Brigadier General in the Indonesian Army. He was one of the leaders of the 30 September Movement, a group that killed six of the army's top generals and launched a failed coup attempt on 1 October 1965.

== Biography ==
Soepardjo was regimental commander of the Siliwangi Division which was stationed in West Java. As a result of his pro-Communist sympathies and actions, he was sent to Kalimantan, away from the centres of power on Java, and took part in the Indonesian actions against British and Malaysian troops in Borneo (see Konfrontasi). Based at Menggaian in West Kalimantan, he led the Fourth Combat Command of KOSTRAD, the army's strategic reserve.

On 28 September 1965, he left his post without the knowledge of then KOSTRAD commander, Suharto (later President of Indonesia). He had received a telegram from his wife stating that his child was sick. At Soepardjo's trial in 1967, an ex-Communist official testified that the cable was code between Soepardjo and Communist participating in the coup, and that the real reason for his return to Java was to help command the coup.

Some Soepardjo's military colleagues reported he was resentful over his slow pace of promotion and may have had a grudge against army commander, General Yani, who was one of the 30 September Movement's principal victims. According to General Sarwo Edhie Wibowo, commander of the fiercely anti-communist RPKAD para-commandos, Soepardjo requested RPKAD reinforcements be sent to Kalimantan on 1 October. When Sarwo Edhie heard of the coup attempt, the sailing orders to Kalimantan were cancelled.

After the failure of the coup, Soepardjo went into hiding. He was eventually arrested on January 12, 1967. He was found guilty of treason, sentenced to death and executed by firing squad on May 16, 1970.

== The Soepardjo Document ==
=== Background ===
In the years following the failure of the 30 September Movement, General Soepardjo wrote an analysis of the movement, titled Some Factors That Influenced the Defeat of ‘the September 30th Movement’ as Viewed from a Military Perspective. A copy of these personal notes, now known as the ‘Soepardjo Document’, was intercepted by military officers and added to the records of the military court that tried Soepardjo in 1967. In the document, Soepardjo reflects on what may have caused the September 30th Movement to fail, based upon his military experience and what he witnessed throughout the event.

=== Importance ===
Soepardjo wrote this document while on the run as he had already been stripped of his rank and dismissed from the military. This key fact is what gives the document its importance, and historian John Roosa notes that the document may be the most important primary source on the movement. The Soepardjo Document is the only primary source which was written by a participant of the September 30th Movement before his arrest. The fact that the document was written before he was arrested means that there was no chance for the military to influence his testimony unlike those from other generals, which led to many unreliable narratives as most of their stories were either coerced through torture or fabricated by the media.

Before the movement, Soepardjo was a highly decorated military officer. He was the highest ranking officer to participate in the movement as Commander of the Fourth Combat Command of the Mandala Vigilance Command. Many are quick to assume that Soepardjo had a significant role in planning the movement due to the fact that he was the highest ranking officer; however, he confesses in the document that he only arrived in Jakarta three days before the event.

Soepardjo’s role within the movement is a unique one as he can be viewed both as an outsider and insider. Being stationed along the border between Indonesia and Malaysia in the months leading up to the movement, he could not have been too heavily involved in the planning of the movement. The fact that he was not directly involved in the planning and was not too close with many of the other planning generals assigns him more of the role of the detached spectator. There were plenty of detached spectators of the time who could have given their opinions on the movement, but it is Soepardjo’s additional role as an insider that makes his document reliable. Once the movement was initiated, Soepardjo and the core organizers made plans for how they should proceed at their hideout at Halim Air Base. Furthermore, the fact that the core organizers also trusted Soepardjo to talk to the president on their behalf proves that they believed him to be an essential asset to their plans.

The basis of the Soepardjo document is an explanation of why Soepardjo believed the movement was a failure, but it also provides reliable information on the leadership of the movement and answers many questions that historians have had for a long time. With regards to the leadership of the movement, Soepardjo clears up the common misconception that he was the leader of the movement by stressing that he neither commanded any of the troops that were supplied by other organizers of the movement nor supplied any troops. Soepardjo concluded that the movement was in fact led, “by the party” since he knew of Sjam’s role as a representative of the PKI. While there were questions for a long time over who truly led the movement stemming from a questionable claim of responsibility from Sjam at his trial, Soepardjo states that there were three levels of leadership heading the movement. The first level was the head group which he believes consisted of the PKI Leadership, followed by the second level which was Sjam and his friends which made up the Special Bureau, and finally followed by Colonel Untung and the other military officers.

Since he was not involved in the planning meetings, Soepardjo’s role as an outsider could cast doubt on the accuracy of the document. This lack of involvement could have led to unfamiliarity about the movement and the party itself, which does cause some discrepancies in his document, such as the number and purpose of sectors that Jakarta was divided into. Soepardjo had said that there were 3 sectors, whose purpose were to provide food to the troops. Njono, the head of the PKI in Jakarta, however, recalled that there were 6 sectors, each of which were to be provided food by the troops.

However, Soepardjo’s status as the highest ranking officer and direct contact with the core group of organizers makes this document reliable enough to draw accurate conclusions from.

=== Contents ===
Soepardjo cites a number of reasons for the failure of the movement. Primarily, he notes that the movement had neither an overall leader nor a clear chain of command. There was a loose structure in the cooperation between the PKI and the military, and the two groups were constantly arguing over courses of strategic action, which led to moments of indecisiveness during critical points in the movement.

However, Soepardjo later reveals in the document that the PKI was the true body behind the movement, and for that reason, he believes Kamaruzaman Sjam played the leading role. He viewed Sjam as an arrogant and stubborn individual who was both stiff to criticism and adamant that the movement would not fail. Sjam had falsely assumed that troops throughout Indonesia were ready to revolt. He wanted the movement to be “the fuse of a bomb rather than the bomb itself”, and hoped that the movement would incite large-scale rebellions nationwide. However, the leaders of the movement did not verify beforehand that the PKI masses were ready to respond to any military action.

Another failure that Soepardjo mentions is that the organizers of the movement did not have a backup plan in case the movement did not succeed. Not only was there no backup plan, but the original plan itself was not fully complete. Furthermore, when Ahmad Yani, the supreme army commander, was assassinated during the movement, Sukarno chose Pranoto Reksosamudro to be his replacement, but Pranoto did not assert the power that Sukarno vested in him and failed to oppose Suharto for control of the army. Had Pranoto done so, Soepardjo suggests that the movement could have been saved.
