= Kamaruzaman Sjam =

Indonesian politician (1924–1986)

Sjam Kamaruzzaman

Personal details
- Born: April 30, 1924 Tuban, East Java, Dutch East Indies
- Died: September 30, 1986 (aged 62) Thousand Islands, DKI Jakarta, Indonesia
- Cause of death: Execution by Firing squad
- Party: Communist Party of Indonesia

Kamaruzaman Sjam (30 April 1924 – 30 September 1986), also known as Kamarusaman bin Achmad Mubaidah and Sjam, was a key member of the Communist Party of Indonesia or the PKI who was executed for his part in the 1965 coup attempt known as the 30 September Movement.

== Early life ==
According to his courtroom testimony at his trial for involvement in the 30 September Movement, Sjam was born in Tuban, East Java in 1924. He was a descendant of Arab traders who settled on Java's north coast. He attended elementary school, high school and then an agronomy school in Surabaya. The agronomy school was closed down when Japanese invaded the Dutch East Indies in 1942. Sjam abandoned his studies before graduating and went to Yogyakarta, where he attended business school. He was a member of the Pathuk group of youths resisting the Japanese around the Pathuk district of Yogyakarta. He participated in an attack on the main Japanese government office in Yogyakarta in September 1945 when his group lowered the Japanese flag and raised the red and white Indonesian flag.

== Early political career ==
In 1947, Socialist Party leaders sent five youths, including Sjam, to Jakarta to help republican officials smuggle supplies and money to Yogyakarta, at the time the Indonesian capital. Upon arrival in Jakarta, Sjam contacted republican officials. Sjam worked in the Ministry of Information and lived on Jalan Guntur. He met with men who had been studying in the Netherlands and studied Marxism-Leninism once a week. Sjam was a civil servant from 1947 to 1948, and was organizing trade unions from 1948 to 1950. Together with the other four group members, Sjam joined the Communist Party of Indonesia (PKI) in 1949, then joined the military section of the PKI Organizational Department in the 1950s. He would have had a large number of contacts within the military who he had known in the Pathuk group.

However, although Sjam claimed in court that he joined the PKI in 1949, according to Mortimer he was listed (under the name of Kamarusaman) in the Suara Sosialis (Voice of Socialism) as a Socialist Party member undergoing intensive party training in Jakarta. According to Roosa, Sjam could not have been a member of both the Communist and Socialist Parties at the same time in the 1950s.

== Rise within the PKI ==
Roosa claims that Sjam helped PKI leaders D.N. Aidit and M. H. Lukman "reappear" at Jakarta's Tanjung Priok port after they had pretended to go into exile following the Madiun Affair in 1948 when there was an abortive left wing coup attempt. Sjam helped the two men pass through immigration.

In 1964 or 1964, Sjam was appointed head of the PKI Special Bureau. This comprised five men: Sjam, Pono (Supono Marsudidjojo), Sjam's assistant Bono, Wandi, and Hamim. The first three had the job of contacting military personnel to gather information. All the members of this group had daytime jobs to conceal their party membership and their true functions. The five men met once a month to exchange information, which Sjam would then pass on to Aidit, who would in turn give orders. Within the PKI, only Aidit and a few senior party members knew of the existence of the Special Bureau, and a number of measures were taken to ensure secrecy was maintained. To outsiders, Sjam, Pono and Bono appeared to be army spies. The three men had official cards allowing them access to Army bases, and each maintained their own contracts. At his 1967 trial, Sjam said that efforts to recruit soldiers started with a friendly approach, then if no resistance was encountered, moved gradually on the Marxist theory, although the aim was to recruit informers rather than party members. In return, Sjam and his associates passed on information to the military about Islamist rebellions then underway in different parts of Indonesia. Given that many of the rebels were fierce anti-communists, this was in the PKI's interest

== Role in the 30 September Movement ==
According to Sjam's testimony at his trial, by mid-1965, the Special Bureau of the Communist Party of Indonesia under Sjam had had considerable success infiltrating the military, and was in regular contact with hundreds of officers. The situation in Indonesia at the time was extremely tense, with rampant inflation and rumors of death lists being drawn up by communists and non-communists. In the run up to Armed Forces Day on October 5, 1965, with large numbers of troops heading for the capital, many people were expecting a coup d'état. PKI leader D. N. Aidit asked Sjam to use his contacts to find out if the rumors were true. Sjam concluded that they were, and informed Aidit.

On the night of September 30, 1965, a group calling itself the 30 September Movement kidnapped and later murdered six top Indonesian Army generals. The next morning, armed members of the group took control of the square in the center of Jakarta, and announced over Indonesian national radio that they had acted to foil a coup planned by group of Army generals.

By the late next morning, Sjam, along with President Sukarno, Air Force commander Air Vice-Marshal Omar Dani and PKI leader D. N. Aidit were all at the movement's headquarters at Halim Air Force Base on the outskirts of Jakarta. Roosa believes that rather than being Aidit's subordinate, Sjam was actually in charge of the movement. He had taken the lead after becoming convinced action was needed to forestall the military coup d'état, and had persuaded those officers loyal to him and the PKI to join the movement.

Having promised Aidit that the plan would work, Sjam was determined to continue with it, despite the flaws due to poor communication and planning. Even after the failure to kidnap Army chief-of-Staff Nasution, the unplanned murders of the kidnapped generals and the failure to obtain Sukarno's blessing, Aidit and Sjam insisted on continuing. However, once it became apparent the movement in Jakarta had failed, Sjam and Aidit decided the PKI leader should fly to central Java to continue the struggle. Sjam was taken in to Jakarta, and eventually captured in March 1967

== Testimony in court and execution ==
In court as a witness during the trials of other people accused of responsibility for the 30 September Movement, Sjam claimed he had been acting under the orders of Aidit during the entire movement. He was sentenced to death in 1968, but continued to appear as a witness in various trials, at which he continued to reveal further details in an attempt to postpone his execution. He was finally executed in September 1986.
