= List of massacres in South Korea =

The following is a list of massacres that have occurred in South Korea.

Name	Date	Location	Deaths	Notes
Asan massacre	1950	Asan	800	Committed by SK police, Korean Youth League and Taeguki Alliance.
Autumn Uprising of 1946	1946, September–October	South Korea	611	The uprising resulted in the deaths of 92 policemen, 163 civil workers, 116 civilians, and 240 rioters. 7,500 injured, 2,609 people were arrested by the police and military.
Bodo League massacre	1950, Summer	South Korea	100,000–200,000	Mass murder of communists and suspected communist sympathizers
Bloody Gulch massacre	1950, August 12	Masan	75	North Korea's Korean People's Army (KPA) 13th Regiment then killed 75 US Army prisoners of war
Chaplain-Medic Massacre	1950, 7 (Jul) 16	Tunam	31 POWs	Victims included 1 chaplain. 1 survivor of massacre
December Massacres	1950, December	Seoul	thousands	Massacre of suspected communists
Ganghwa massacre	1951, Jan 6-9	Ganghwa County	212–1300	Massacre of 212 to 1,300 unarmed civilians by South Korean forces, South Korean Police forces and pro-South Korean militiamen
Geochang massacre	1951, Feb 9–11	Geochang	719	Massacre of 719 unarmed citizens by 11th Division of the South Korean Army
Jeongeup massacre	1950, September	Jeongeup	167	North Korean forces murdered numerous Protestants and right-wingers.
Nonsan massacre	1950, September 27–28	Nonsan	66	North Korean soldiers executed 66 members of a Protestant Church.
Goyang Geumjeong Cave Massacre	1950, 10 (Oct) 9-31	Goyang	over 153	After the victory of the Second Battle of Seoul, South Korean authorities arrested and summarily executed several individuals along with their families on suspicion of sympathizing with North Korea
Hangang Bridge bombing	1950, 28 June	Hangang Bridge, Seoul	500-800	Demolition operation conducted by the South Korean Army to destroy the Hangang Bridge
Hill 303 Massacre	1950, Aug 17	Waegwan	41 POWs	Forty-one United States Army (US) prisoners of war were murdered by troops of the North Korean People's Army (KPA).
Jeju uprising	1948, Apr 3	Jeju Island	25,000–30,000	Killed about 1/5th of the island's population
Mungyeong massacre	1949 Dec 24	Mungyeong	86–88	Massacre of 86 to 88 unarmed civilians by Syngman Rhee anticommunist forces
Namyangju Massacre	1950, 10 (Oct)-early 1951	Namyangju	over 460	More than 460 people were summarily executed, including at least 23 children under the age of 10 by South Korean police and local militia forces.
National Defense Corps Incident	1950, December		50,000–90,000	50,000 to 90,000 soldiers starved to death or died of disease on the march and in the training camps
No Gun Ri Massacre	1950, Jul 26–29	No Gun Ri	163–400	Mass killing of 163 - 400 South Korean refugees by U.S. military air and ground fire near the village of Nogeun-ri.
Sancheong-Hamyang massacre	1951, Feb 7	Sancheong and Hamyang	705	Massacre of 705 unarmed citizens by South Korean forces
Seoul National University Hospital massacre	1950, 28 June	Seoul	700-900	Massacre of 700 to 900 doctors, nurses, inpatient civilians and wounded soldiers by the Korean People's Army (KPA).
Yeosu-Suncheon Rebellion	1948, October - October However pockets of resistance lasted through to 1957, almost 10 years later.	Yeosu, Suncheon	2,976-3,392	During the Yeosu-Suncheon Rebellion, between 2,976 and 3,392 people died (depending on the sources), some 82 people went missing, between 1,407 and 2,056 people were injured
Hongcheon shooting	1958, January 23	Hongcheon, Gangwon	7 (including the perpetrator)	An army captain Cho Sang Kook killed six people in Hongcheon during the night of January 23, 1958.
Bloody Tuesday	1960, April 19	Seoul	186	
Blue House raid	1968, January 17–29	Blue House, Seoul	59	Failed assassination attempt of Park Chung Hee by Unit 124
Wonju shooting	1969, June 5	Wonju, Gangwon Province	6 (Including the perpetrator)	5-6 wounded
Kimpo killings	1971, January 18	Kimpo	7 (including the perpetrator)	Killing spree by a South Korean marine
Unit 684 mutiny	1971, August 23	Silmido and Seoul	38	
1974 Kimpo killings	1974, May 1	Kimpo	11 (Including the perpetrator)	
Assassination of Park Chung Hee	1979, October 26	Blue House, Seoul	6	The incident is often referred to as "10.26" or the "10.26 incident"
Gwangju Democratization Movement	1980, May 18–27	Kwangju	over 165	Civil/Political
Uiryeong massacre	1982, April 26–27	Uiryeong County, South Gyeongsang Province	57 (including the perpetrator)	South Korean policeman Woo Bum-kon murdered 56 people and wounded around 35 others in several villages in Uiryeong County, before committing suicide when he was confronted by police.
Cho Jun-hui Incident	1984, June 26	Goseong County, Gangwon	15+	Perpetrator attacked his military camp, then fled across the border after the massacre
Gimpo International Airport bombing	1986, September 14	Gangseo District, Seoul	5	Bombing of airport by North Korea
Odaeyang mass suicide	1987, August 28	Yongin, Gyeonggi Province	32	Mass suicide
Frog Boys case	1991, March 26	Daegu	5	Unsolved homicide of 5 boys
Daegu Nightclub Arson	1991, October 17	Daegu	16	Attack on a nightclub, 13 Wounded
Daegu subway fire	2003, February 18	Jungangno station, Daegu	192	Deadliest mass murder committed by a single perpetrator
2005 Yeoncheon shooting	2005, June 19	Yeoncheon County	8	Private Kim Dong-min threw a grenade with a pin released at the interior office and fired a gun, killing eight people and injuring two others, known to the Korean public as the "Kim Il-byeong Incident."
Nonhyeon-dong massacre	2008, October 20	Nonhyeon, Seoul	6	Arson and stabbing attack
Ganghwa Island shooting	2011, July 4	Ganghwa County	4	
Goseong killing spree	2014, June 21	Goseong County, Gangwon Province	5	Rampage by a South Korean soldier
Sejong and Hwaseong shootings	2015, 25–27 February	Sejong, Hoseo and Hwaseong, Gyeonggi	8 (including both perpetrators)	Two separate mass murder-suicides two days apart
Gunsan Bar arson attack	2018 June	Gunsan, North Jeolla Province	5	28 injured
Daegu office fire	2022, June 9	Daegu	7 (including the suspect)	Seven people are killed and 49 are injured by a fire, suspected to be an arson attack, that spread through an office building in Daegu. The suspect Cheon (53) was killed in the fire.
Gwanak restaurant stabbing	2025, September 3	Jowon-dong, Gwanak District, Seoul	3	Two men and a woman were fatally stabbed at a pizza restaurant in Gwanak District by Kim Dong-won, the owner of the restaurant. All victims were pronounced dead upon being transported to hospital.

== See also ==
- Korean War
- List of massacres in North Korea
- Truth and Reconciliation Commission (South Korea)
