= Namyangju massacre =

1950–1951 Korean War massacres

- Part of the Korean War
- Namyangju (South Korea)
- Location: Namyangju, Gyeonggi-do, South Korea
- Date: October 1950 – early 1951
- Target: Suspected leftists and their families
- Attack type: Massacre
- Deaths: over 460
- Perpetrators: South Korean Police and local militia

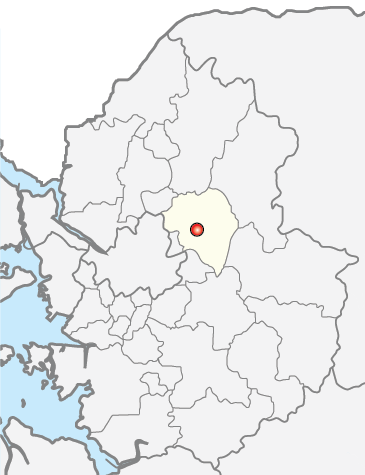
Location of Namyangju within Gyeonggi-do

The Namyangju massacre (Korean: 남양주 민간인학살, Hanja: 南楊州民間人虐殺 Namyangju civilian massacre) was a war crime conducted by South Korean police and local militia forces between October 1950 and early 1951 in Namyangju, Gyeonggi-do district of South Korea. More than 460 people were summarily executed, including at least 23 children under the age of 10.

After the victory of the Second Battle of Seoul, South Korean authorities arrested and summarily executed several individuals along with their families on suspicion of sympathizing with North Korea. During the massacre, South Korean Police conducted the Goyang Geumjeong Cave massacre in Goyang near Namyangju.

On 22 May 2008, the Truth and Reconciliation Commission demanded that the South Korean government apologize for the massacre and support a memorial service for the victims.

== See also ==
- Anti-communist mass killings
- December massacres
- Ganghwa massacre
- Geochang massacre
- Bodo League massacre
- Goyang Geumjeong Cave massacre
- Mungyeong massacre
- No Gun Ri massacre
- Sancheong–Hamyang massacre
- Yeosu–Suncheon rebellion
- Jeju uprising
- List of massacres in South Korea
- Indonesian mass killings of 1965-66, a similar massacre in Indonesia targeting alleged leftists.
