= Ganghwa massacre =

1951 massacre in Incheon, South Korea

- Ganghwa (South Korea)
- Location: South Korea
- Date: 6 January 1951 – 8 January 1951
- Target: Korean People's Army collaborator civilians
- Attack type: Massacre
- Deaths: 212 – 1,300
- Perpetrators: South Korean forces, South Korean Police forces and pro-South Korean militiamen

The Ganghwa massacre (Korean: 강화 양민학살 사건; Hanja: 江華良民虐殺事件) was a massacre conducted by the South Korean forces, South Korean Police forces and pro-South Korean militiamen, between 6 and 9 January 1951, of 212 to 1,300 unarmed civilians in the Ganghwa county of the Incheon metropolitan city in South Korea. The victims were so-called collaborators with the Korean People's Army during North Korean occupation. Before this massacre, 140 people were executed in Ganghwa as part of the Bodo League massacre in 1950.

In 2003, a history book describing the massacre was published by the Ganghwa Culture Center. On 26 February 2006, the National Archives of Korea admitted a 30 August 1951 official document in which then Attorney General Jo Jinman reported to then-Prime Minister Chang Myon about the massacre. On 17 July 2008, the South Korean governmental Truth and Reconciliation Commission acknowledged the civilian massacre.

== See also ==
- Third Battle of Seoul
- Anti-communist mass killings
- December massacres
- Geochang massacre
- Bodo League massacre
- Goyang Geumjeong Cave massacre
- Mungyeong massacre
- Namyangju massacre
- No Gun Ri massacre
- Sancheong–Hamyang massacre
- Yeosu–Suncheon rebellion
- Jeju uprising
- List of massacres in South Korea
