= Sancheong–Hamyang massacre =

1951 massacre of unarmed civilians by South Korean forces during the Korean War

Coordinates: 35°25′01″N 127°52′25″E

Sancheong and Hamyang massacre
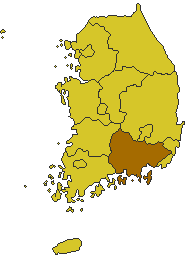
- South Gyeongsang, South Korea.
- Location: South Korea
- Date: February 7, 1951; 75 years ago
- Target: Communist sympathizer civilians
- Attack type: Massacre
- Deaths: 705
- Perpetrator: South-Korean forces

The Sancheong and Hamyang massacre (Korean: 산청・함양 양민학살 사건, Hanja: 山清・咸陽良民虐殺事件) was a massacre conducted by a unit of the South Korean Army 11th Division during the Korean War. On 7 February 1951, 705 unarmed citizens in Sancheong and Hamyang, South Gyeongsang district of South Korea were killed. The victims were civilians and 85% of them were women, children and elderly people. The 11th Division also conducted the Geochang massacre two days later. The division's commanding general was Choe Deok-sin.

On 20 February 2006, the National Archives of Korea reported that files concerning the massacre had been found.

On 7 November 2008, a memorial park for the victims was established in Sancheong.

== See also ==
- Truth and Reconciliation Commission (South Korea)
- Anti-communist mass killings
- December massacres
- Ganghwa massacre
- Geochang massacre
- Bodo League massacre
- Goyang Geumjeong Cave massacre
- Mungyeong massacre
- Namyangju massacre
- No Gun Ri massacre
- Yeosu–Suncheon rebellion
- Jeju uprising
- List of massacres in South Korea
