= Seoul National University Hospital massacre =

1950 civilian massacre in Seoul during the Korean War

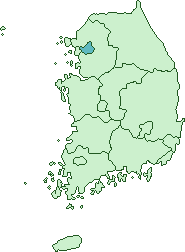
- Seoul, South Korea
- Location: Seoul, South Korea
- Date: June 28, 1950; 76 years ago
- Target: Medical personnel, inpatient civilians, and wounded soldiers
- Attack type: Massacre
- Deaths: over 1,000
- Perpetrator: Korean People's Army

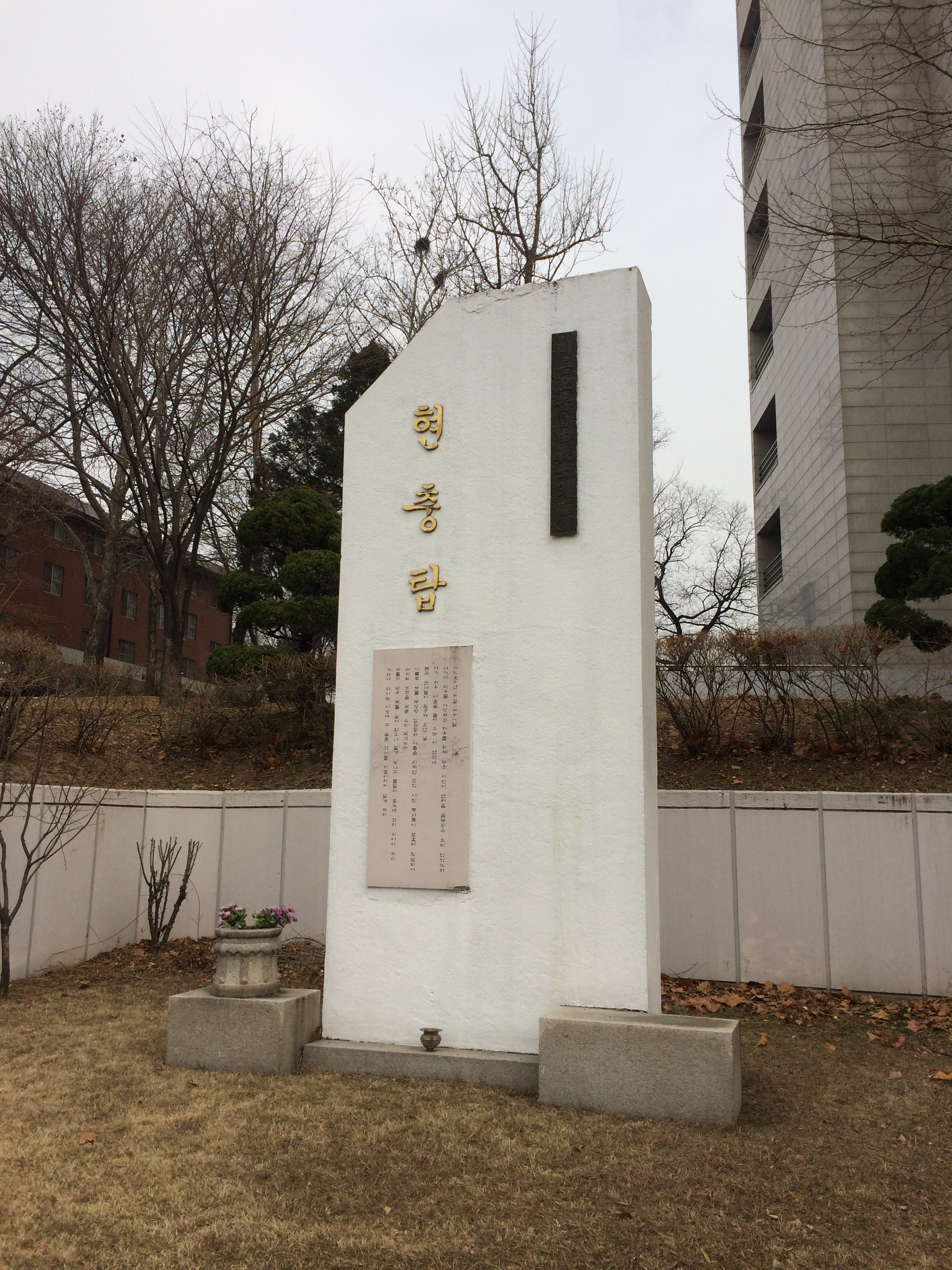
Memorial to victims of the Seoul National University Hospital Massacre

The Seoul National University Hospital massacre (Korean: 서울대학교 부속병원 학살 사건; Hanja: 서울國立大學校附属病院虐殺事件) was a massacre of 700 to 900 South Korean doctors, nurses, inpatient civilians, and wounded soldiers by the Korean People's Army (KPA) on 28 June 1950 at the Seoul National University Hospital, Seoul district of South Korea. During the First Battle of Seoul, the KPA wiped out one platoon which guarded Seoul National University Hospital on 28 June 1950. The North Korean army massacred South Korean medical personnel, inpatient civilians, and wounded soldiers. The Korean People's Army shot, grenaded, or buried their victims alive. The number of confirmed deaths is 330, although the civilian victims have been estimated to number 900. According to South Korean Ministry of National Defense, the victims included 100 wounded South Korean soldiers. The massacre is memorialized by the "Monument to Unknown Freedom Fighters" that is in front of the modern-day hospital.

== See also ==
- Bodo League massacre
- Mungyeong massacre
- Geochang massacre
- Hill 303 massacre
- Chaplain–Medic massacre
- List of massacres in South Korea
