= December massacres =

1950 executions in Seoul, South Korea

The December massacres were a series of politically motivated executions carried out by the South Korean government following the recapture of Pyongyang by communist forces in the Korean War. The killings took place in South Korea, but mainly in and around Seoul. It is believed the South Korean government executed thousands of people, but accurate estimates are difficult to come by. The Rhee regime received criticism from the international community and the executions damaged his image.

== Background ==
By October 1950, forces of the United Nations and the Republic of Korea (ROK) had succeeded in nearly destroying all of the North Korean military. The People's Republic of China warned Allied forces that if they approached the Yalu River the Chinese might be forced to intervene. In late October, Chinese forces crossed the Yalu River and engaged UN forces near the Chinese-Korean border. A number of victories by the Chinese would send United Nations and Republic of Korea (ROK) forces reeling southward. By early December, it had become clear that UN forces would not defend Pyongyang and the city was soon after recaptured.

== Massacres ==
Following the fall of Pyongyang, mass executions and arrests of communists became commonplace in South Korea. This was not the first time either side had executed alleged supporters of the opposition, as throughout the war planned executions were fairly common, though usually on smaller more isolated scale. In October, The London Times reported that nearly 300 men and women were detained and beaten with rifle butts and bamboo sticks. Other practices included inserting bamboo splinters under the nails as a torture method and mass shootings in public spaces. On Friday, 15 December 1950, British and American Troops witnessed the execution of over 800 political prisoners in the outskirts of Seoul. Reports included truckloads of prisoners, including women and children, being unloaded and executed in the trenches where they were to be buried. Five riflemen did the shooting, with the executions beginning at 7:30 am and finishing at 8:10 am. An eyewitness account describes a young boy of about 8 years old, kneeling in a trench and crying, turning to one of the guards before being shot. Victims typically included alleged communists, saboteurs and murderers. While the killings were well documented by UN forces, the South Korean government continued to deny accusations that any wrongdoing had taken place.

== Reaction ==
The international community responded with outrage to news of the mass executions in the South. Globally there were calls for the Rhee regime to immediately halt the executions. Most reports suggest UN forces reacted with disgust to the mass executions. One British soldier reported that ROK soldiers proceeded to execute prisoners a mere 150 feet from their camp; he was forced to walk away when they began executing children during breakfast. UN commanders were particularly concerned that their association with the regime would undermine their mission in Korea but did little to investigate into the killings. Rhee responded by pledging to end all mass executions and promised to mitigate death sentences for prisoners. While he gave assurances to UN leaders that the killings would stop and there would be thorough investigations and court martialing for guilty parties, it is difficult to assess if the executions continued out of eyesight.

== Historical significance ==
Earlier that same year, the Rhee regime committed the Bodo League massacre, during which between 60,000 and 200,000 communists and alleged communist sympathizers were killed. The December massacres put increased international pressure and criticism on the Rhee regime. North Korean forces were also guilty of committing crimes throughout the war. One such instance in June 1950 resulted in the murder of over 700 wounded soldiers, medical staff and civilians in the Seoul National University Hospital Massacre. The back and forth nature of the atrocities fueled the opposing sides propaganda machines for the duration of the war.

Reports of mass executions continued to damage the legitimacy of the South Korean government and in turn the credibility of the United Nations intervention. Mass executions generally declined following the December massacres but the Rhee regime further cemented its heavy-handed image. The massacres made easy political propaganda for communist forces and were used to denounce the regime in the South for years to come.

== See also ==
- National Defense Corps Incident
- Anti-communist mass killings
- Ganghwa massacre
- Geochang massacre
- Bodo League massacre
- Goyang Geumjeong Cave massacre
- Mungyeong massacre
- Namyangju massacre
- No Gun Ri massacre
- Sancheong–Hamyang massacre
- Yeosu–Suncheon rebellion
- Jeju uprising
- List of massacres in South Korea
