= Goyang Geumjeong Cave massacre =

1950 killings in South Korea

Coordinates: 37.6994°N 126.7803°E

- Goyang Geumjeong Cave (South Korea)
- Location: Goyang, Gyeonggi-do, South Korea
- Date: October 9, 1950 – October 31, 1950
- Target: Individuals and their family members for being suspected of being communists or communist sympathizers
- Attack type: Massacre
- Deaths: 153
- Perpetrator: South Korean Police

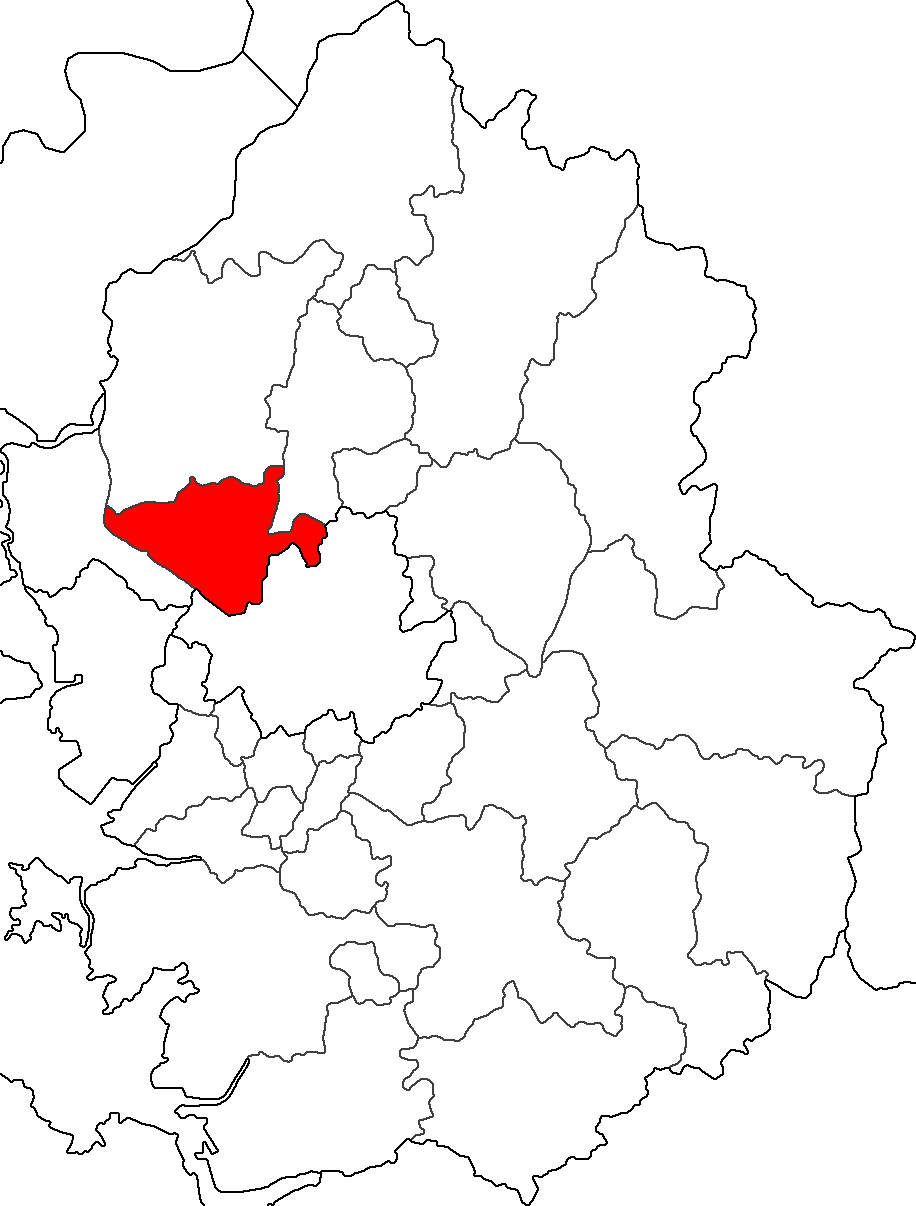
Location of Goyang in Gyeonggi-do

The Goyang Geumjeong Cave massacre (Korean: 고양 금정굴 민간인 학살; Hanja: 高陽衿井窟民間人虐殺; lit. 'Goyang Geunjeong Cave civilian massacre') was a war crime of 153 unarmed civilians conducted between 9 October 1950 and 31 October 1950 by police at the site of a former gold mine in Goyang, Gyeonggi-do district of South Korea. After the victory of the Second Battle of Seoul, South Korean authorities arrested and summarily executed several individuals along with their families on suspicion of sympathizing with North Korea. The killings in Goyang coincided with the Namyangju massacre in nearby Namyangju.

In 1995 the bodies of the 153 victims were excavated by their families. In June 2006 the Truth and Reconciliation Commission demanded that the South Korean government apologize and erect a monument for the victims. However, the government did not show any intention of following through on the TRCK recommendation. In 2007 the Truth and Reconciliation Commission again demanded that the government apologize, provide compensation, and erect a memorial for the victims; however, the government still refused. The Truth and Reconciliation Commission also clarified most of the victims, including 8 teenagers and 7 women, had no relation to rebels.

On November 28, 2011, the Seoul central court ordered the South Korean government to apologize, pay reparations and fund a memorial to the victims' families.

== See also ==
- Truth and Reconciliation Commission (South Korea)
- Anti-communist mass killings
- December massacres
- Ganghwa massacre
- Geochang massacre
- Bodo League massacre
- Mungyeong massacre
- Namyangju massacre
- No Gun Ri massacre
- Sancheong–Hamyang massacre
- Yeosu–Suncheon rebellion
- Jeju uprising
- List of massacres in South Korea
