= National Defense Corps incident =

Death march that occurred in the winter of 1951 during the Korean War

- Part of the Korean War
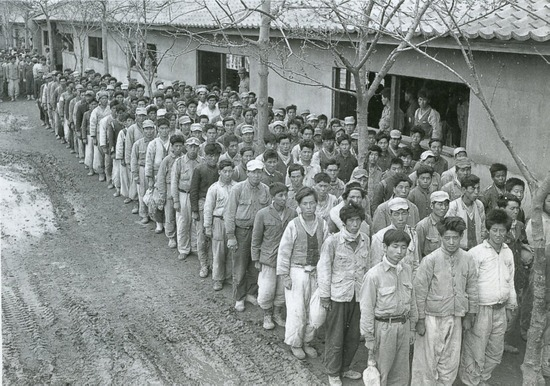
- National Defense Corps soldiers in January 1951
- Date: December 1950 – February 1951
- Location: South Korea
- Cause: Malnutrition and frostbite caused by political corruption
- Deaths: 50,000–120,000
- Convicted: Kim Yun-geun, Yun Ik-heon, Kang Seok-han, Park Chang-eon, Park Gi-hwan
- Sentence: Death by firing squad

Korean name
- Hangul: 국민방위군 사건
- Hanja: 國民防衛軍事件
- RR: Gungmin bangwigun sageon
- MR: Kungmin pangwigun sakŏn

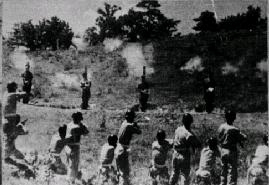
The execution of five commanding officers on 12 August 1951

The National Defense Corps Incident was a death march that occurred in South Korea during the Korean War between December 1950 and February 1951. An estimated 50,000 to 120,000 conscripts died from malnutrition and frostbite as a result of corruption in the government of President Syngman Rhee.

Hundreds of thousands of South Korean men were mobilized into the newly-created National Defense Corps to defend South Korea against a North Korean-Chinese invasion after the UN retreat from North Korea. Funds and supplies were embezzled by corrupt high-ranking officials appointed by Rhee. Conscripts were forced to report for military training on foot, sometimes over hundreds of miles away, without appropriate food, clothing or shelter in the winter weather.

Investigation by the National Assembly of South Korea exposed widespread corruption in the South Korean government and military, leading to a political crisis for Rhee and the execution of five key officials of the National Defense Corps. The incident refers to both the deaths from starvation during the retreat and the corruption that led to the deaths.

== Background ==
The Korean War began on 25 June 1950 when North Korea launched Operation Pokpung, the invasion of South Korea which resulted in its near-conquest. The United Nations (UN) condemned the invasion in late July and the United Nations Command, a multi-national force of anti-communist countries led by United States, was deployed to assist South Korea. By this point, the North Koreans controlled most of South Korea except for a small area around the city of Pusan, and their victory seemed imminent. North Korean defeats at the Battle of the Pusan Perimeter and the Battle of Inchon in September triggered a reversal of the war, as the North Koreans rapidly withdrew from South Korea and the UN offensive into North Korea led to the near-conquest of the country within a month. The People's Republic of China, threatened by UN forces approaching the Yalu River and the possible defeat of their ally, intervened in the war to support North Korea. The Chinese launched the successful Second Phase Offensive in late November, leading to the rapid retreat of UN forces from North Korea and the second invasion of South Korea.

On 11 December 1950, the South Korean government of President Syngman Rhee issued an act establishing the National Defense Corps, a national guard-like force to defend against the incoming invasion. All South Korean men aged 17 to 40, excluding military, police, and government officials, were conscripted into the National Defense Corps, which was nominally under the Ministry of National Defense. Rhee and his administration had a reputation for their corruption and cronyism, which led South Korea to be woefully unprepared for the war. Officers of the National Defense Corps were mainly drawn from the pro-Rhee Great Korean Youth Association. Rhee offered leadership of the force to Kim Du-han, a former gangster that had led a Student Volunteer Forces unit during the Great Naktong Offensive, who declined because he had no formal military training. Defence Minister Shin Song-mo recommend his son-in-law Kim Yun-geun, a high-ranking member the Korean Youth League and champion wrestler with no military training or experience. Yun Ik-heon, a Korean independence activist who had graduated from Huangpu Military Academy in the Republic of China, was appointed as his deputy. Yun had formal military training and administrative experience in various right-wing youth organisations, but was of dubious character and suspected of embezzlement.

== Incident ==
A cohort of around 500,000 South Korean men were mobilised to serve in the National Defense Corps, and ordered to report to one of 51 training units located in southern South Korea. Immediately, serious issues began to appear after the mobilisation order due to the widespread corruption in the Rhee regime. Extraordinarily poor logistics meant the conscripts had to travel to their training bases with little-to-no assistance from the state. Funds allocated to the National Defense Corps were woefully insufficient, much of it being quickly embezzled by Kim Yun-geun and corrupt officers. Conscripts were forced to travel on foot, sometimes for hundreds of miles in the bitter December winter weather, without the adequate food, clothing or shelter for such a journey. Many were killed and many more maimed from malnutrition or frostbite before even reaching their training camps, being tantamount to a death march. These were often no better, being equally plagued by chronic corruption as funds and supplies were embezzled. Each camp had a quota of around 10,000 men, but rather than individual conscripts being assigned to a particular camp, these places were filled on a "first-come first-serve" basis. Conscripts would sometimes arrive at a camp, only to be told there were no vacancies and to travel to another camp, which caused further casualties. However, camp officers would falsely report meeting their quotas to the government, then embezzle the funds for "ghost soldiers" who actually existed.

== Aftermath ==
The disastrous mobilisation of the National Defense Corps was a highly visible incident that could not be suppressed by the Rhee regime, and it soon caught the attention of the political opposition in South Korea. Numerous witnesses, and rumours quickly spreading across the country, made a cover-up nearly impossible. Lee Cheol-seung reported the incident to the National Assembly of South Korea in early January 1951 after receiving reports of corruption within the National Defense Corps. Lee met with a personal friend who had been conscripted to gather information on the issue, only to find him suffering from severe malnutrition.

On 15 January 1951, the National Assembly launched a fact-finding mission into the National Defense Corps incident, as evidence quickly mounted. Kim Yun-geun and Shin Seong-mo attempted to smear supporters of the mission as "subversive elements" and a "fifth column" but to no effect. Rhee himself was scrutinised for his appointments in the National Defense Corps, and faced pressure from his own officials to punish those responsible. Minister of Home Affairs Chough Pyung-ok personally confronted Rhee at Gyeongmudae with photographs of the corpses of dead conscripts. Mayor of Seoul Yun Bo-seon, one of Rhee's closest aides, visited Gyeongmudae and demanded that he punish Shin, Kim Yun-geun, and other National Defense Corp officials. Rhee told Yun the incident was a communist plot, but Yun dismissed the claim and requested evidence, leading to a break between the two.

Rhee was reluctant to punish those responsible, Shin in particular, despite mounting pressure. He decided to try Kim Yun-geun and Yun Ik-heon in a military court due to public anger, but when Kim was acquitted and Yun was sentenced to only three years and six months in prison, it just inflamed public anger even more. Commanders of the United States Forces Korea were enraged and confronted Rhee on the issue, threatening to withdraw U.S. forces from South Korea unless Shin was dismissed and those responsible were punished. Rhee continued to refuse to dismiss Shin even after the Geochang massacre in early February, and Shin's attempts to defend the massacre in the National Assembly were met with widespread criticism.

On 30 April 1951, the National Assembly adopted a resolution on disbandment of the National Defense Corps. The National Assembly investigation showed that the commanding officers embezzled one billion won, and tens of millions of won was misappropriated to President Rhee's political fund.

In May 1951, Shin and Vice President Yi Si-yeong resigned.

In June 1951, it was reported that five billion won in funds for the National Defense Corps had been embezzled.

On 12 August 1951, Kim Yun-geun, Yun Ik-heon, Kang Seok-han, Park Chang-eon, and Park Gi-hwan were publicly executed as persons in charge of the National Defense Corps incident.

=== Number of deaths and casualties ===
By June 1951, when an investigating committee made known its findings, it was reported that some 50,000 to 90,000 soldiers starved to death or died of disease on the march and in the training camps.

Figures vary on the number of deaths and casualties. According to a 13 June 1951 article in the New York Times, approximately 300,000 men were lost to death or desertion over a three-week 300-mile march.

According to a 2021 article in Foreign Policy by S. Nathan Park, 120,000 soldiers died from frostbite and malnutrition.

== See also ==
- December Massacres of 1950 in the Korean War
- Truth and Reconciliation Commission (South Korea)
