= Yongsan bombing =

1950 bombing of Seoul by the U.S.

Coordinates: 37°34′N 126°58′E

The Yongsan bombing by the United States Air Force took place during the North Korean offensive of the Korean War and included a destructive bombing raid in Seoul. About 50 B-29s with the U.S. Fifth Air Force bombed Yongsan, Seoul on 16 July 1950. The B-29s dropped bombs on the switch yard and arsenal behind the Yongsan Station to slow down the North Korean army advance; however, some of the bombs missed the targets and hit civilian facilities. Some 1,587 citizens were killed representing 58.6% of the total civilian casualties. The South Korean Truth and Reconciliation Commission declined to investigate the incident, calling the bombing operation a military necessity.
