= Bodo League massacre =

1950 anti-communist massacre in South Korea

- Part of the Korean War
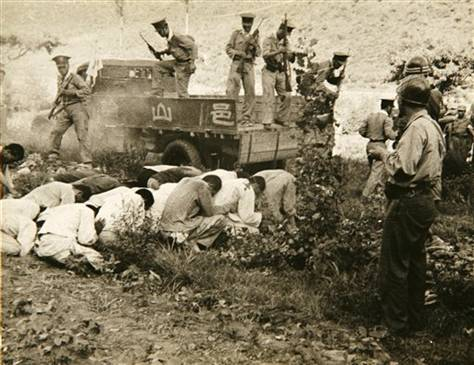
- Summary execution of South Korean political prisoners by the South Korean military and police at Daejeon, South Korea
- Location: South Korea
- Date: Summer of 1950 (76 years ago)
- Target: Alleged communists and communist sympathizers
- Attack type: Massacre, politicide, summary execution, mass killing
- Deaths: 60,000 to 200,000
- Perpetrators: South Korean police, military, and anti-communists on direct orders from President Syngman Rhee
- Motive: Anti-communism; fear of North Korean fifth column

The Bodo League massacre (Korean: 보도연맹 학살; Hanja: 保導聯盟虐殺) was the mass killing of alleged communists and communist sympathizers by South Korean forces in the summer of 1950, during the Korean War. Many victims were civilians who had no connection to communism or communists. Estimates of the death toll vary, with historians estimating that between 60,000 and 200,000 people were killed.

South Korean president Syngman Rhee ordered the massacre, but the South Korean government falsely blamed it on the communists led by North Korean leader Kim Il Sung. The South Korean government made efforts to conceal the massacre for four decades. Survivors were forbidden by the government from revealing it, under threat of being treated as communist sympathizers; public revelation carried with it the threat of torture and death. From the 1990s onwards, several corpses were excavated from mass graves, resulting in public awareness of the massacre. Half a century after the massacre, the Truth and Reconciliation Commission investigated the massacre among other incidents that were largely kept hidden from history, unlike the well-publicized North Korean executions of confirmed and alleged South Korean right-wingers.

== Bodo League ==
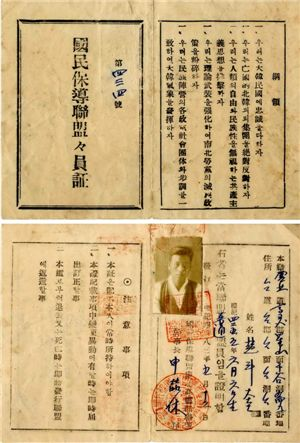
National Bodo League members identity card

The Bodo League was an official group formed by the South Korean government under President Syngman Rhee, starting in 1949 and primarily working in 1950. The group was created by Korean jurists who had collaborated with the Japanese colonial government. Rhee and other government officials enrolled 300,000 suspected communist sympathizers or political opponents in an official "re-education" movement primarily known as the National Bodo League (Note: also called the National Rehabilitation and Guidance League, National Guard Alliance, National Guidance Alliance, Gukmin Bodo Yeonmaeng, 국민보도연맹; 國民保導聯盟) on the pretext of protecting them from execution. Non-communist sympathizers and others were also forced into the Bodo League to fill enlistment quotas.

In 1950, just before the outbreak of the Korean War, the first president of South Korea, Syngman Rhee, had about 20,000 alleged communists imprisoned.

== Executions ==
Under the leadership of Kim Il Sung, the Korean People's Army attacked from the north on 25 June 1950, starting the Korean War. According to Kim Mansik, who was a military police superior officer, President Syngman Rhee ordered the execution of people related to either the Bodo League or the South Korean Workers Party on 27 June 1950. The first massacre was started one day later in Hoengseong, Gangwon Province on 28 June. Retreating South Korean forces and anti-communist groups executed the alleged communist prisoners, along with many of the Bodo League members. The executions were performed without any trials or sentencing. Kim Tae Sun, the chief of the Seoul Metropolitan Police, admitted to personally executing at least 12 "communists and suspected communists" after the outbreak of the war. When Seoul was recaptured in late September 1950, an estimated 30,000 South Koreans were summarily deemed collaborators with the North Koreans and shot by ROK forces. At least one US lieutenant colonel is known to have approved the executions at the request of a South Korean regimental commander. Lt. Col. Rollins S. Emmerich, after initially stalling and disapproving, told the South Korean regimental commander Kim Chong-won that he could kill a large number of political prisoners in Busan if the North Korean troops approached so that they would not fall into enemy hands. A mass execution of 3,400 South Koreans did indeed take place near Busan that summer.

United States official documents show that American officers witnessed and photographed the massacre. In another, United States official documents show that John J. Muccio, then United States Ambassador to South Korea, made recommendations to Rhee and Defense Minister Shin Sung-mo that the executions be stopped. American witnesses also reported the scene of the execution of a girl who appeared to be 12 or 13 years old. The massacre was also reported to both Washington and Gen. Douglas MacArthur, who described it as an "internal matter". According to one witness, 40 victims had their backs broken with rifle butts and were shot later. Victims in seaside villages were tied together and thrown into the sea to drown. Retired South Korean Adm. Nam Sang-hui confessed that he authorized 200 victims' bodies to be thrown into the sea, saying, "There was no time for trials for them."

There were also British and Australian witnesses. Great Britain raised this issue with the U.S. at a diplomatic level, causing Dean Rusk, Assistant Secretary of State for Far Eastern Affairs, to inform the British that U.S. commanders were doing "everything they can to curb such atrocities". During the massacre, the British protected their allies and saved some citizens. The Associated Press conducted extensive archival research and found documents classified "secret" and "filed away" by the Pentagon and State Department in Washington, that had indicated the US commander Gen. Douglas MacArthur made no attempts to curb the summary mass killings.

=== Daejeon ===
Daejeon Massacre
- Part of the Bodo League massacre
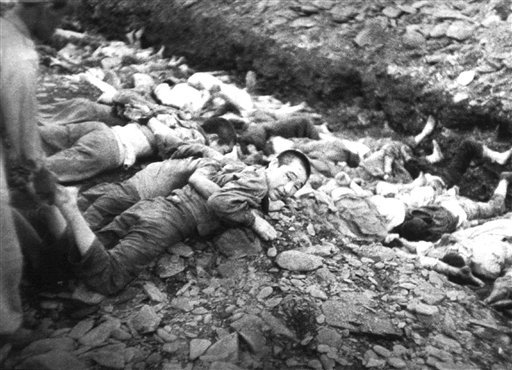
- Prisoners lie on the ground before execution by South Korean troops near Daejon, South Korea, July 1950. Photo by U.S. Army Maj. Abbott.
- Location: Daejeon, South Korea
- Date: 28 June 1950 – 16 July 1950
- Target: Communists and suspected communist sympathizers
- Attack type: Massacre
- Deaths: 4,000–7,000
- Perpetrator: South Korean anti-communists

- Daejeon Massacre
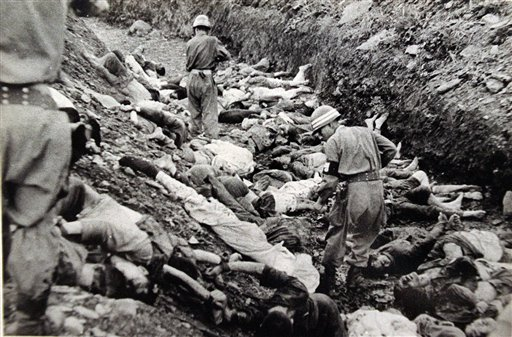
- South Korean soldiers walk among bodies of South Korean political prisoners shot near Daejon, South Korea, July 1950. Photo by U.S. Army Major Abbott.

Daejeon Massacre
- Hangul: 대전형무소 학살 사건
- RR: Daejeon hyeongmuso haksal sageon
- MR: Taejŏn hyŏngmuso haksal sakŏn

As the North Korean army was nearing Daejeon, the South Korean paramilitary forces executed around 7,000 political prisoners, men, women, and children in mass graves as American officers took photographs which were kept classified until they were released in 1999. This was merely one of many such mass killings conducted by South Korean forces against political prisoners in the first months of the war. Many, including the Daejon Massacre, were propagandistically blamed on the North Koreans.

== Aftermath ==
After the UN offensive in which South Korea recovered its occupied territories, the police and militia groups executed suspected North Korean sympathizers. In October 1950, the Goyang Geumjeong Cave massacre occurred. In December, British troops saved civilians lined up to be shot by South Korean officers and seized one execution site outside Seoul to prevent further massacres. On 4 January 1951, the Ganghwa massacre was committed by South Korean police, who killed 139 civilians in an effort to prevent their collaboration with the North Koreans. According to a South Korean report, South Korea and the U.S. "aided right-wing civil organizations, such as the Ganghwa Self-defense Forces, by providing combat equipment and supplies."

== Truth and Reconciliation Commission ==
In 2008, trenches containing bodies were discovered in Daejeon, South Korea, and other sites. South Korea's Truth and Reconciliation Commission documented testimonies of those still alive and who took part in the executions, including former Daejeon prison guard Lee Joon-young.

Besides photographs of the execution trench sites, the National Archives in Washington D.C. released declassified photographs of U.S. soldiers at execution sites including Daejeon, confirming American military knowledge.

== See also ==
- Anti-communist mass killings
- December massacres
- Ganghwa massacre
- Geochang massacre
- Goyang Geumjeong Cave massacre
- Mungyeong massacre
- Namyangju massacre
- No Gun Ri massacre
- Sancheong–Hamyang massacre
- Yeosu–Suncheon rebellion
- Jeju uprising
- List of massacres in South Korea
- Seoul National University Hospital massacre
