= Mungyeong massacre =

1949 massacre by the South Korean Army

Coordinates: 36°43′26″N 128°12′44″E

Mungyeong Massacre
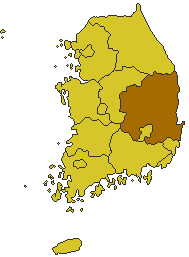
- North Gyeongsang, South Korea.
- Location: South Korea
- Date: 24 December 1949; 76 years ago
- Target: Communist sympathizer civilians
- Attack type: Massacre
- Deaths: 86–88
- Perpetrator: Syngman Rhee's anticommunist forces

The Mungyeong Massacre (Korean: 문경 양민학살 사건; Hanja: 聞慶良民虐殺事件) was a massacre conducted by 2nd and 3rd platoon, 7th company, 3rd battalion, 25th Infantry Regiment, 3rd Infantry Division of the South Korean Army on 24 December 1949 of 86 to 88 unarmed civilians in Mungyeong, North Gyeongsang Province district of South Korea, a majority of whom were children and elderly people. The victims included 32 children. The victims were massacred because they were suspected communist supporters or collaborators. However, the South Korean government blamed the crime on communist guerrillas for decades.

== Legacy ==
On 26 June 2006, the Truth and Reconciliation Commission of South Korea concluded that the massacre was committed by the South Korean army. However, a South Korean local court decided that charging the South Korean government with the massacre was barred by statute of limitations, as the five-year prescription ended in December 1954. On 10 February 2009, the South Korean high court also dismissed the victims' family complaint. In June 2011, the South Korean supreme court decided that the South Korean government should compensate victims of the inhumane crimes it had committed regardless of the deadline to make the claim.

== See also ==
- Truth and Reconciliation Commission (South Korea)
- Anti-communist mass killings
- December massacres
- Ganghwa massacre
- Geochang massacre
- Bodo League massacre
- Goyang Geumjeong Cave massacre
- Namyangju massacre
- No Gun Ri massacre
- Sancheong–Hamyang massacre
- Yeosu–Suncheon rebellion
- Jeju uprising
- List of massacres in South Korea
