= Hamyang County =

Coordinates: 35°31′14″N 127°43′30″E

Hamyang
- County
- Panoramic view of Ungok-ri, Seoha-myeon

- Flag Emblem of Hamyang

- Location in South Korea
- Country: South Korea
- Region: Yeongnam
- Administrative divisions: 1 eup, 10 myeon

Area
  - Total: 725.03 km^{2} (279.94 sq mi)

Population (September 2024)
  - Total: 36,307
  - Density: 56.1/km^{2} (145/sq mi)
  - Dialect: Gyeongsang

Korean name
- Hangul: 함양군
- Hanja: 咸陽郡
- RR: Hamyang-gun
- MR: Hamyang-gun

Hamyang County (Korean: 함양군) is a county in South Gyeongsang Province, South Korea.

It is home to the Wooden Seated Statue of Buddha in Beopinsa (법인사), the Standing Statue of Buddha in Deokjeonri (덕전리), the Three-Level Stone Pagoda, Stone Seated Statue of Buddha, Three Storied Stone Pagoda of Seungansa (승안사) Temple Site. There are also historical sites such as the Namgyeseowon (남계서원) Confucian School, Hwangseoksanseong (황석산성) Fortress, and Sageunsanseong (사근산성) Fortress.

== History ==
=== Three Kingdoms Period ===
The Sageunsanseong Fortress, which encircles the peak of Yeonhwasan Mountain (443 m above sea level) is presumed to have been built during the Three Kingdoms of Korea (57 BCE-668 CE) and used until the Joseon period (1392-1910). The fortress was located at a strategic pass and was therefore a site of fierce conflicts between the Baekje Kingdom (18 BCE-660 CE) to the west and the Silla Kingdom (57 BCE-935 CE) to the east. The fortress also played a very important role in guarding against Japanese pirates who invaded from the southern coast in an attempt to reach the fertile lands of the Jeolla region.

According to historical sources, it is said that when the Japanese invaded this area in 1380, around 500 people died here in battle. The fortress was neglected for centuries until it was repaired in the late 15th century.

The fortress wall measures about 1.2 km in circumference and about 5 m in height. The walls are made of rectangular stones and were built using a technique typical of the 7th century. Inside the fortress, various remains were excavated, including building and gate sites and a stone pond, as well as artifacts from the Baekje and Silla Kingdoms.

=== The Unified Shilla period ===
Hamyang-gun was called Sokham-gun or Hamsung during the Unified Shilla era. In 757 AD in the 16th year of King Gyeongdeok of Silla, the name was changed to Cheonryung-gun. Under King Gyeongduk's reign, it was called Yeosun and placed under Geochang-gun.

=== Joseon Dynasty ===
In 1552, the Namgyeseowon Confucian Academy was built during the 7th year of the reign of Myeongjong of Joseon) in memory of Jeong Yeo-chang's academic accomplishments.

Hamyang-gun (1899)

In mid-August 1597, in the early stage of the Jeongyujae crisis, there was an invasion of Japanese troops against the Hwangseoksan Fortress. The battle was fought between local citizens in Hamyang and Aneum Geochang of Joseon and Katō Kiyomasa of the Japanese military, with over 60,000 troops. The Hwangseoksanseong Fortress was guarded by Gwak Jun, the governor of Aneumhyeon, as the chief commander, Baek Sa-rim of Gimhae Busa as the supreme commander, and Jo Jo-do, the former governor of Hamyang. The battle started on August 16 and the Joseon army was completely annihilated on the 18th, but Baeksarim of Gimhae Bussa. 353 Koreans were killed inside the fortress.

== Climate ==
Climate data for Hamyang (2011–2020 normals, extremes 2010–present)
Month	Jan	Feb	Mar	Apr	May	Jun	Jul	Aug	Sep	Oct	Nov	Dec	Year
Record high °C (°F)	17.3 (63.1)	23.0 (73.4)	26.5 (79.7)	30.9 (87.6)	35.1 (95.2)	36.7 (98.1)	37.8 (100.0)	37.3 (99.1)	34.0 (93.2)	31.2 (88.2)	26.2 (79.2)	17.3 (63.1)	37.8 (100.0)
Mean daily maximum °C (°F)	5.8 (42.4)	8.4 (47.1)	14.3 (57.7)	19.7 (67.5)	25.5 (77.9)	28.2 (82.8)	30.4 (86.7)	31.2 (88.2)	26.3 (79.3)	21.6 (70.9)	15.0 (59.0)	7.4 (45.3)	19.5 (67.1)
Daily mean °C (°F)	−0.3 (31.5)	1.8 (35.2)	7.0 (44.6)	12.4 (54.3)	18.0 (64.4)	22.0 (71.6)	25.2 (77.4)	25.4 (77.7)	19.9 (67.8)	13.6 (56.5)	7.8 (46.0)	1.2 (34.2)	12.8 (55.0)
Mean daily minimum °C (°F)	−5.7 (21.7)	−4.2 (24.4)	−0.1 (31.8)	5.1 (41.2)	10.5 (50.9)	16.6 (61.9)	21.1 (70.0)	21.3 (70.3)	15.0 (59.0)	7.6 (45.7)	1.9 (35.4)	−4.1 (24.6)	7.1 (44.8)
Record low °C (°F)	−16.0 (3.2)	−14.3 (6.3)	−8.3 (17.1)	−4.3 (24.3)	0.8 (33.4)	8.1 (46.6)	12.5 (54.5)	11.6 (52.9)	4.6 (40.3)	−3.6 (25.5)	−6.5 (20.3)	−14.0 (6.8)	−16.0 (3.2)
Average precipitation mm (inches)	22.8 (0.90)	30.5 (1.20)	60.5 (2.38)	104.7 (4.12)	64.4 (2.54)	114.0 (4.49)	285.1 (11.22)	289.1 (11.38)	165.1 (6.50)	115.6 (4.55)	50.9 (2.00)	22.4 (0.88)	1,325.1 (52.17)
Average precipitation days (≥ 0.1 mm)	5.9	6.1	8.2	9.9	8.7	11.1	15.4	14.4	10.8	7.0	8.6	7.6	113.7
Average relative humidity (%)	64.0	62.0	61.8	64.7	68.6	77.3	84.6	84.9	85.1	80.3	74.9	68.7	73.1
Mean monthly sunshine hours	179.7	174.1	226.1	207.0	249.2	178.7	147.4	165.2	150.2	184.2	149.7	163.9	2,175.4
Source: Korea Meteorological Administration

== Symbol ==
- Flower : Azalea
- Tree : Zelkova tree
- Bird : Cuckoo
- Animal : Asian black bear
- Major : Lee, cheolwoo (이철우)

== Twin towns – sister cities ==
Hamyang is twinned with:

- Seo-gu, Daejeon, South Korea
- Sasang-gu, Busan, South Korea
- Gwangsan-gu, Gwangju, South Korea
- Eunpyeong-gu, Seoul, South Korea
- Yeonggwang, South Jeolla, South Korea
- Changwon, South Gyeongsang, South Korea
- North Hempstead, Nassau, New York, United States
- (United States) Montgomery Township, Pennsylvania
- Yangzhou, Jiangsu, China
- Huinan, Tonghua, Jilin, China

== See also ==
- Sancheong and Hamyang massacre
