= Geochang massacre =

1951 massacre of unarmed civilians by South Korean forces during the Korean War

Coordinates: 35°34′03″N 127°55′32″E

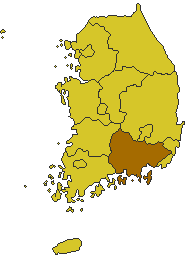
- South Gyeongsang, South Korea.
- Location: South Gyeongsang, South Korea
- Date: February 9, 1951 - February 11, 1951; 75 years ago
- Target: Civilians
- Attack type: Massacre
- Deaths: 719
- Perpetrator: 11th Division of the South Korean Army

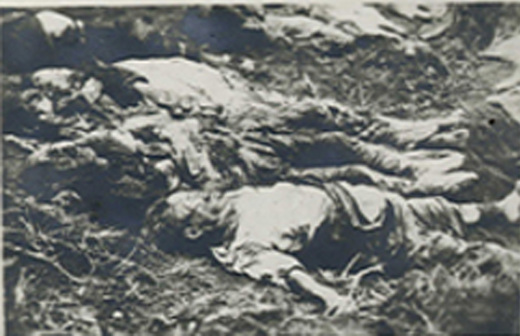
Geochang massacre victims

The Geochang massacre (Korean: 거창 양민학살 사건, Hanja: 居昌良民虐殺事件) was a massacre conducted by the third battalion of the 9th regiment of the 11th Division of the South Korean Army between 9 February 1951 and 11 February 1951 of 719 unarmed citizens in Geochang, South Gyeongsang district of South Korea. The victims included 385 children. The 11th Division also conducted the Sancheong-Hamyang massacre two days earlier. The general commanding the division was Choe Deok-sin.

On February 8 the 3rd Battalion, 9th Regiment, 11th Division of the South Korean army, called the "Hwarang Division", occupied Kwaejong-ri, Simon Sub-County. The guerrilla unit under the Sanchong County Party Committee had temporarily controlled Sinwon County before their brief engagement with the South Korean army during their withdrawal from the region.

On February 10, the "Hwang Division" rounded up 136 men, from six villages in the region, and brought them to the nearby Paksin Valley where they were all killed with machine guns. On February 11, all those who remained in the region were gathered at the playground of the Sinwon Primary School under the pretense of evacuation. They were taken to a remote mountain valley and all shot to death. Most of the victims were old people, women, and children. Only the families of South Korean army members, local police, and public officials were spared.

In an effort to cover up the massacre, the South Korean army burned the victims' bodies and bombed a nearby mountain slope in order to cover them with soil. Sin Song Mo, the then minister of defense of South Korea, downplayed the massacre by claiming that the South Korean army had eliminated "communist bandits", not innocent civilians. Attempting to minimize his complicity in the massacre, the Commander of the 11th Division, Kim Jong-won, said: "Could anyone issue such an order, which goes against common sense?"

In March 1951, Shin Chung-mok (ko), a leading assembly lawmaker from Geochang reported the massacre to the National Assembly against the South Korean Army's cover up. The National Assembly's special investigation team investigated, but was hampered by the South Korean Army's interference. Shin was arrested and sentenced to death in an Army court martial. In May 1951, the second investigation team was dispatched by the National Assembly and they reported the South Korean Army involvement. After the investigation, Major Han and Colonel Oh Ik-gyun were sentenced to life in prison by a military court. President Syngman Rhee subsequently granted clemency to the criminals. This massacre is pointed out as an example of oppression under his rule.

In April 2004, the Geochang Massacre Memorial Park was founded in memory of the victims, in Geochang.

On 20 February 2006, the National Archives and Records Service reported the files about the massacre were found.

In 2001, a local court ordered the South Korean government to pay reparations to the victims' families. On 18 May 2004, a general court ruled that a charge of massacre against the South Korean government was barred by limitation.

On 5 June 2008, the South Korean Supreme Court confirmed that the charge was barred by limitation.

In June 2010, An Jeong-a, a researcher for the Truth and Reconciliation Commission, disclosed National Defense Ministry official documents on his thesis that the massacre had been done under official South Korean Army order in order to annihilate citizens living in the guerrilla influenced area. On September 9, 2010, An was fired for disclosing Geochang massacre documents. The National Defense Ministry accused An of disclosing the documents which he had been only permitted to view under the condition of nondisclosure.

In the late 1950s, Kim Jong-won was sentenced to four years in prison for his involvement in a sniper attack on Vice President Chang Myon. He served his sentence at Seodaemun Prison. Jon-won was released from prison on health grounds in December 1961, as he was suffering from diabetes. He died in January 1964.

== See also ==
- Truth and Reconciliation Commission (South Korea)
- Anti-communist mass killings
- December massacres
- Ganghwa massacre
- Bodo League massacre
- Goyang Geumjeong Cave massacre
- Mungyeong massacre
- Namyangju massacre
- No Gun Ri massacre
- Sancheong–Hamyang massacre
- Yeosu–Suncheon rebellion
- Jeju uprising
- List of massacres in South Korea
