= National Archives of Korea =

South Korean government agency

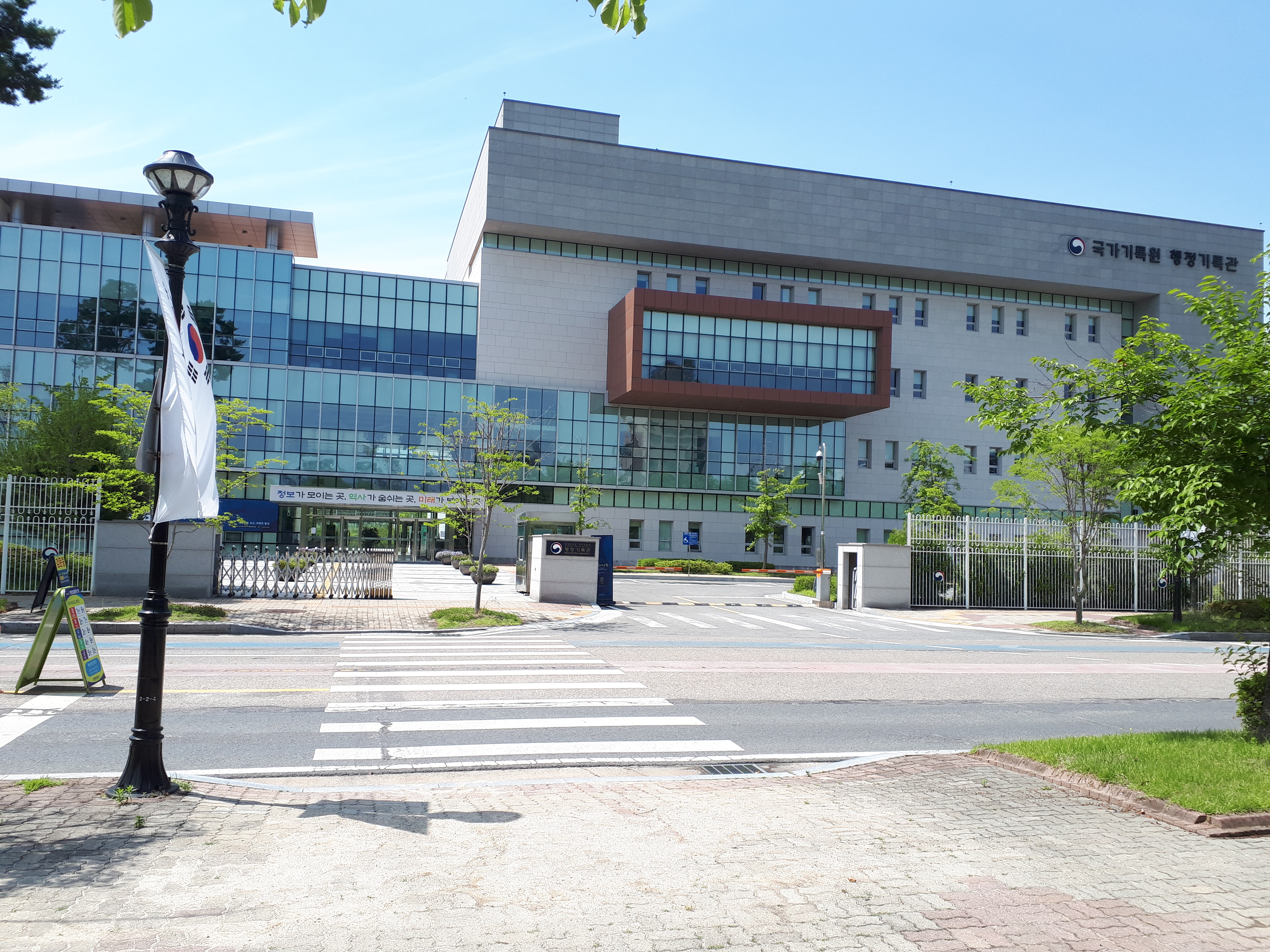
- Administrative repository of National Archives of Korea
- Interactive map of National Archives of Korea
- 36.360999778241386°N 127.38537581151154°E
- Alternative name: 국가기록원
- Location: Daejeon, South Korea
- Website: https://www.archives.go.kr/next/viewMain.do

- National Archives of Korea
- Hangul: 국가기록원
- Hanja: 國家記錄院
- RR: Gukga girogwon
- MR: Kukka kirogwŏn

National Archives of Korea (Korean: 국가기록원) is an agency of South Korean government, charged with preserving government-produced articles and records. It is headquartered in Government Complex Daejeon and has branches in Busan and Seongnam, and an office in Seoul.

Key tasks include establishment of the basic policies and improvement of system for the records management, establishment of the standardization policy for the records management and development and operation of the standards for the records management, drafting and management of the statistics on and related to the records management, establishment and standardization of the electronic management system for records, research and propagation of the management methods and records preservation technology, education and training of staffs associated with the records management, guidance, supervision and evaluation of the records management, liaison and collaboration with other records management institutions, and exchange and cooperation on records management, etc.

Its English title used to be the National Archives and Records Service until September 18, 2007.

== See also ==
- List of national archives
- Ministry of the Interior (South Korea)
