= Law enforcement in South Korea =

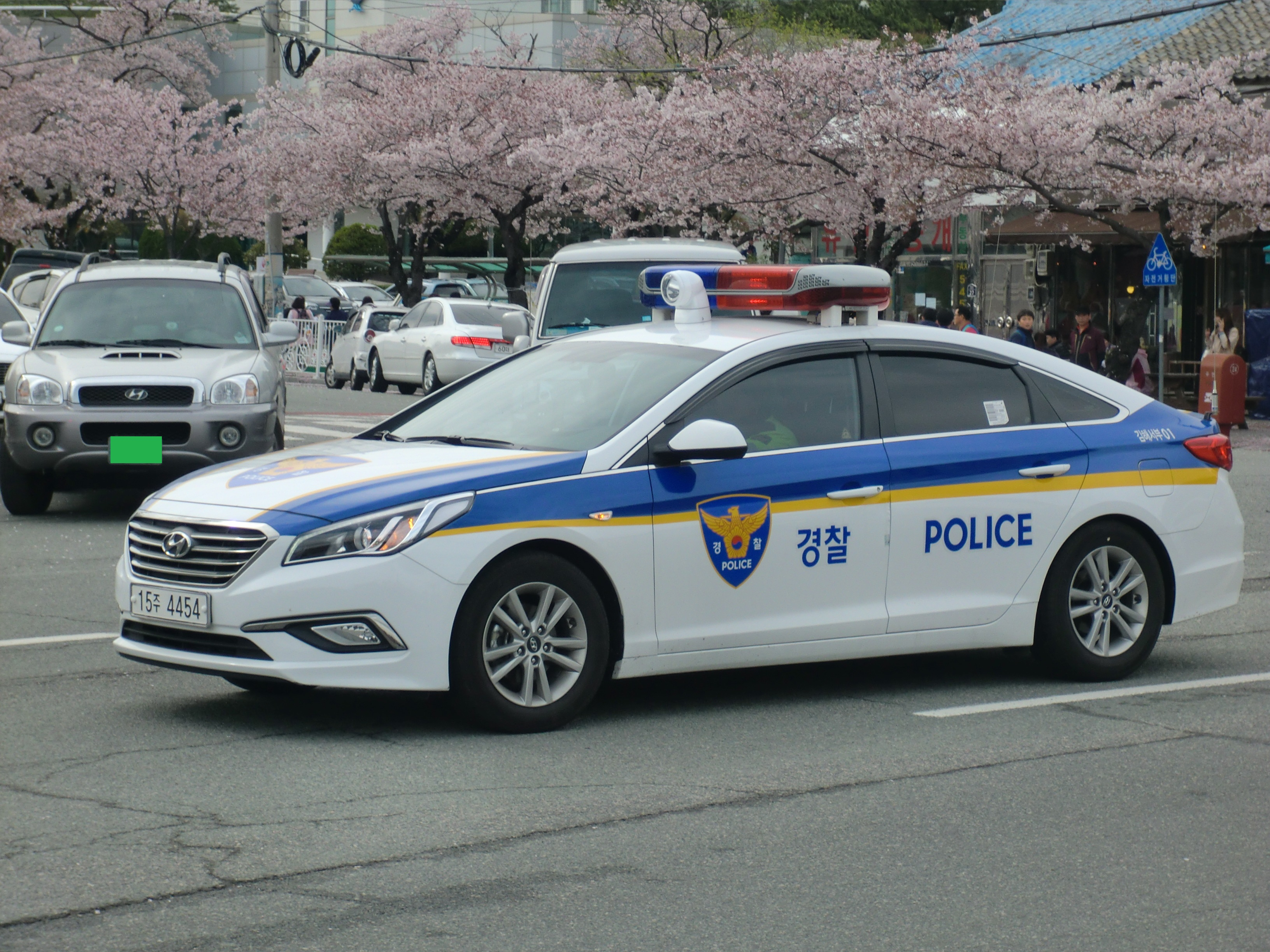
Hyundai Sonata police car in Gimhae.

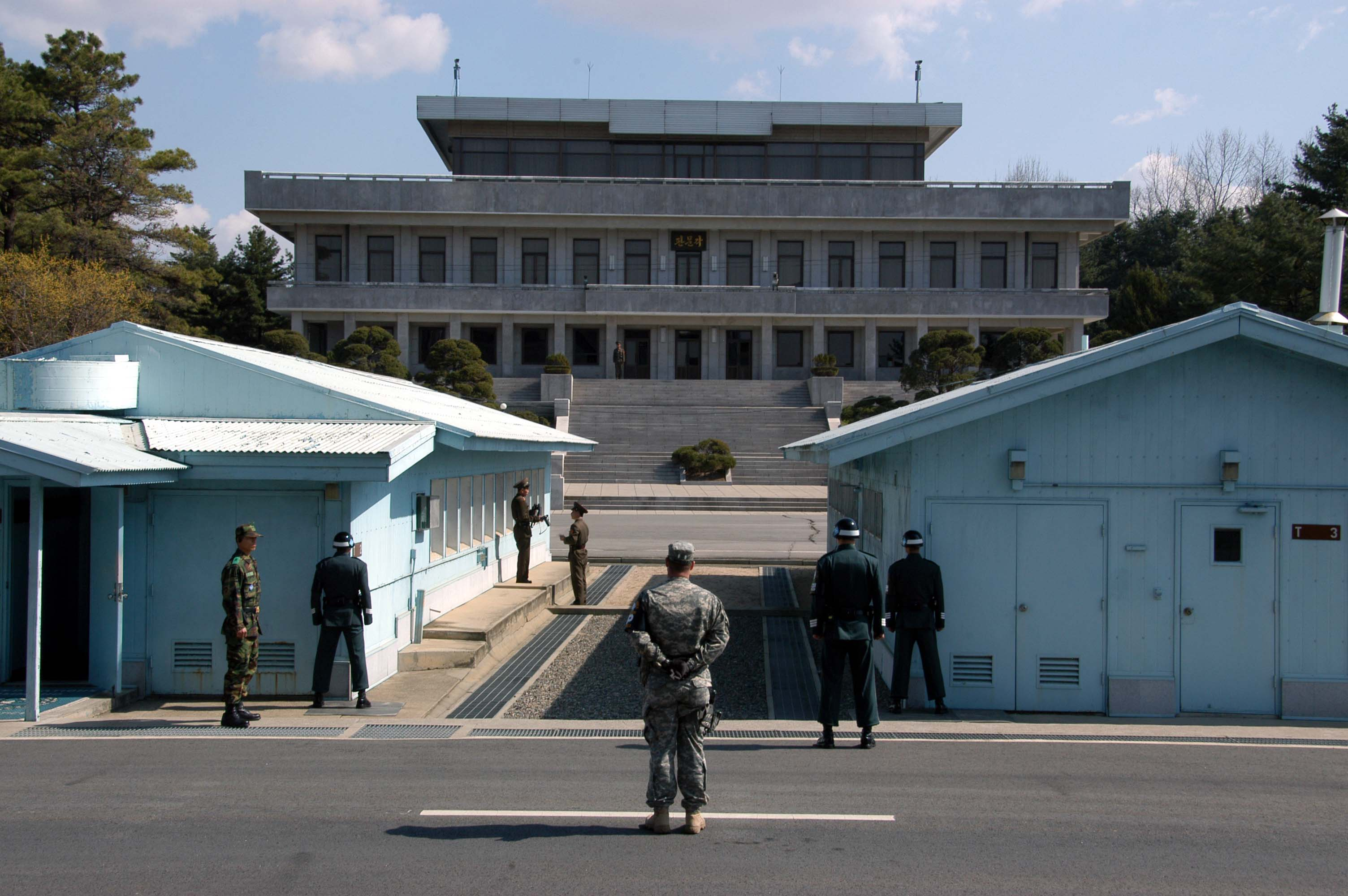
South Korean and North Korean authorities at the Korean Demilitarized Zone.

South Korea has multiple law enforcement organizations. The national police (KNPA), provincial police, border guard, national coast guard, tax service, and Korea Customs Service are all different branches of law enforcement within South Korea. The KNPA is overseen by the Ministry of the Interior and Safety.

The police organizations of the Republic of Korea, including the KNPA and the provincial police, are primarily tasked with protecting individuals and property against crime. Their main duty is to serve the citizens of the country by enforcing the law or preventing and investigating crimes against bodily injury and property damage. They also play a significant role in guarding public and private infrastructure as well as conducting counter-espionage in the interest of national security.

Conducting counterterrorism operations; collecting, preparing, and distributing security information; controlling traffic and preventing harm, seeking international cooperation with foreign government agencies and international organizations; and other duties are carried out to maintain public peace and order.

== History ==
=== Ancient Korea ===
Before the Koryo era, there were many records about criminal law, but there are no accurate records about policing during this period. Law enforcement would have been significantly different than today's modern policing, and as such it is hard to distinguish from the records what style of enforcement occurred in the ancient era. During this time, some people speculate that there was no complete differentiation between government organizations and military organizations.

=== Goryeo and Joseon dynasties ===
During these dynasties, there was an ancient judicial department, often referred to as the anti-criminal department, which oversaw public cooperation and order. A captain in this department was appointed to oversee police affairs. In 1835, the organization was expanded to the left and right anti-criminal department. In 1884, the left and right podo offices were abolished, and a newly established police department oversaw enforcement of public order within the capital. Local police affairs were then managed from within the department.

=== Korean Empire (1897–1910) ===
The modern police system was introduced before the establishment of the Korean Empire in 1897 but was greatly expanded during this period. In 1899, the police chief was no longer a simple official, but had been promoted to the cabinet through a formal appointment as police minister. The police minister was tasked with oversight of all public security work throughout the empire. In 1901, the Ministry of Police was reorganized into an internal police department, and the Minister of Interior became the domain for police affairs.

=== Japanese occupation (1910–1940s) ===
During Imperial Japan's occupation of Korea, the police organizations were directly under the authority of the deputy governor of the Joseon colonies. The central government had a police inspector general's department and local police departments. The military police commander, unobstructed by the Japanese military police commander, also served as the police superintendent who oversaw the country's police organization. The Ministry of Police Supervision directly governed the Ministry of Beijing.

The provincial police ministers were concurrently the provincial gendarmerie captains, responsible for affairs of the police organizations within their provinces. The police chief was then responsible for the police affairs of military units. Lower-ranked captains within the military police would then have the same authority as the chief of police, taking on responsibilities beyond the authority of the police chief. Generally, the police were deployed in areas that mainly need to maintain order, such as the port of departure, while the military police were deployed near military structures or border areas, where it was believed there were militias.

In the 1920s, the police organization changed from military police to civilian police. The general police supervising department and the provincial police departments were abolished, and the police departments under the provincial governor exercised police power. At the same time, military police detachments or military police detachments were set up, and police stations were also established in areas which lacked a station. With an increase in the number of stations being established, the government also formalized a police academy to train officers for placement in new stations.

During this time, the police under the Japanese were expanded to assist in the expansion of territory controlled by Imperial Japan. The police were responsible for national defense, air defense, economic control, listening to the public's trends, media guidance, and national health care until the liberation of the Korean Peninsula.

The Provisional Government of the Republic of Korea, ushered in by the March First Movement in 1919, brought with it a police bureau under the Ministry of the Interior, tasked with civilian law enforcement. The first police chief was recommended by Interior Minister An Changhao, after the election of Jin Jiu on August 12, 1919. The police bureau was responsible for intelligence and supervision and police work. One of the earliest tasks of the police force was to identify and arrest remaining Japanese spies within the country.

Jin Jiu appointed Lu Shungen as the Guard Minister. Shungen employed mostly young Han people, including more than twenty guards. Jin Jiu acted as police chief in this role, and also served as the presiding judge in the interim government without courts. As head of the police during the transition to an unoccupied Korea, Jin Jiu expelled Sun Yujia and Jiang Linyu for allegedly spying on behalf of the Japanese empire. He also had Jin Daoshun, an alleged spy of the Japanese consulate and Huang Heshan, executed for spying and alleged poisining.

=== Modern era ===
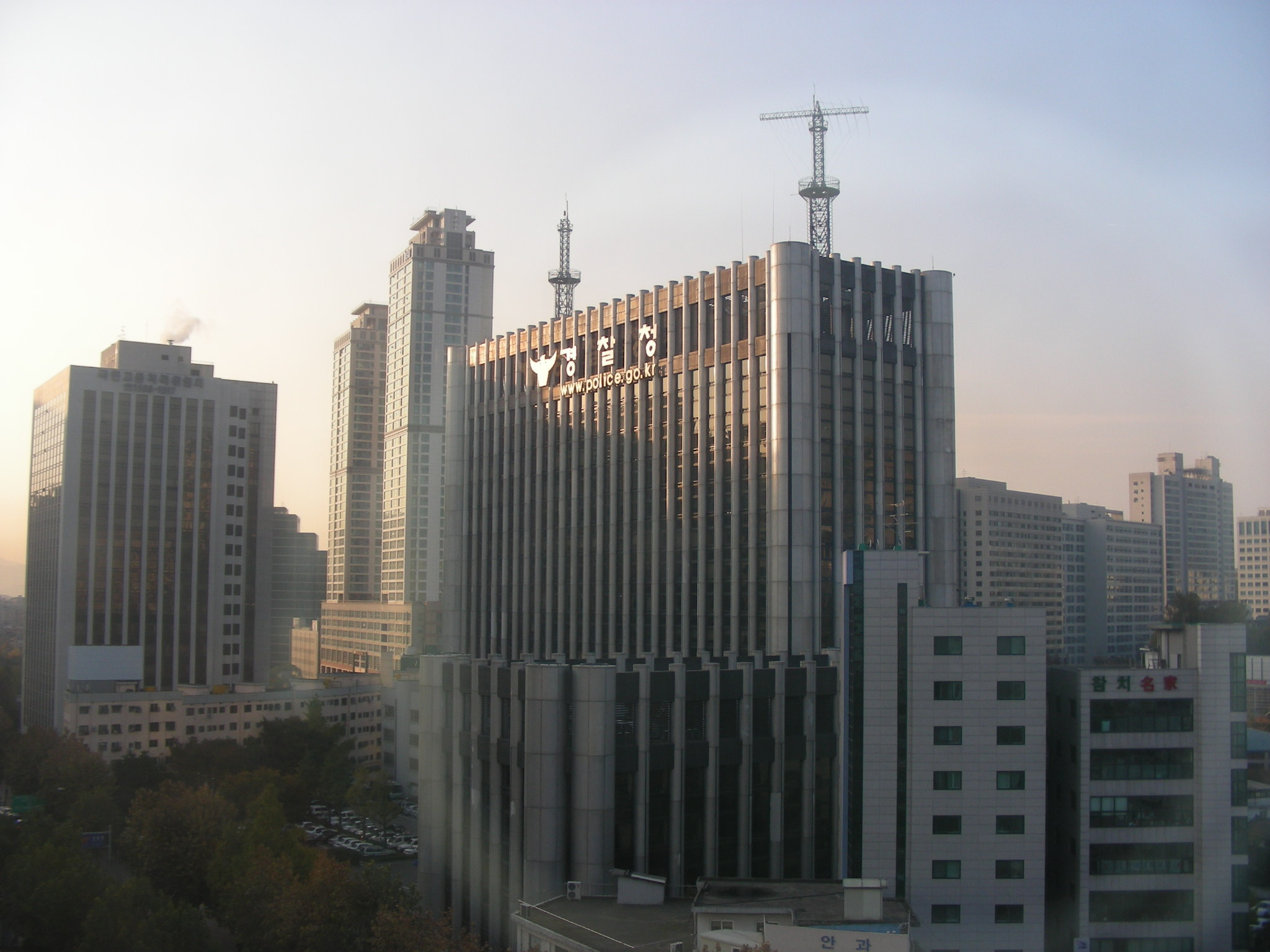
Building of the Korean National Police Agency located in Seodaemun-gu.

After the country's liberation on August 15, 1945, a formal, independent police department was established by the United States army military government. With the creation of the police department, provincial offices were opened on October 21, 1945. Shortly after, a railway police agency was also established.

In September 1948, police authority was transferred from the United States military government to the newly formed Korean government. With this new government, a security bureau at the national level was established under the Ministry of the Interior; converting each city and provincial police office to a regional office of the modern day National Police Agency (KNPA).

In 1949, the Railway district police agency was reduced to the railway police unit, and the Coast Guard was established on December 23, 1953. In 1963, when the railroad police force was eventually abolished as a separate entity, it was consolidated under the national Transportation Bureau.

In 1974, the Public Security Bureau became the Security Headquarters. In 1991, the Security Headquarters was then further expanded to merge with the KNPA, and the metropolitan police agency was changed to the local police agency.

== Korean police officers ==
The class of police civil servants is divided into eleven national positions and eight provincial organizations in which a person may hold a public position as a police officer of varying rank. Police officers must be trained before entering service.

=== Officer classes ===
==== Non-cadre levels ====
Different rankings of police officers exist in the law enforcement agencies in the Republic of Korea. Currently, non-cadre ranking offices are either patrol officers (Grade 9), sheriffs (Grade 8), or sergeants (Grade 7).

==== Middle-level cadres ====
These include Inspector, Inspector (Grade 6), Police (Grade 5), and Chief Police (Grade 4).

==== Senior cadres ====
These are the highest-ranking positions an individual may hold in South Korean law enforcement agencies. These include police officer (Level 3), magistrate (Level 2), sense of public security (Level 1), and superintendent of public security (also called a Deputy Minister). It also includes the deputy head of the local office; the head of the Gyeonggi local office in Busan, Seoul; the police chiefs and deliberation officers of the police department in five strongholds, including the Matsuura City Inspectorate; director of the local police department; director of police education; principal of the central police school; and director of the police department.

The same grade applies to the police department and the marine police departments within the country.

Local posts are classes with the prefix "autonomy" for each class, and Jeju Special Autonomy is also a class that only exists in the autonomous police corps.

=== Appointment process ===
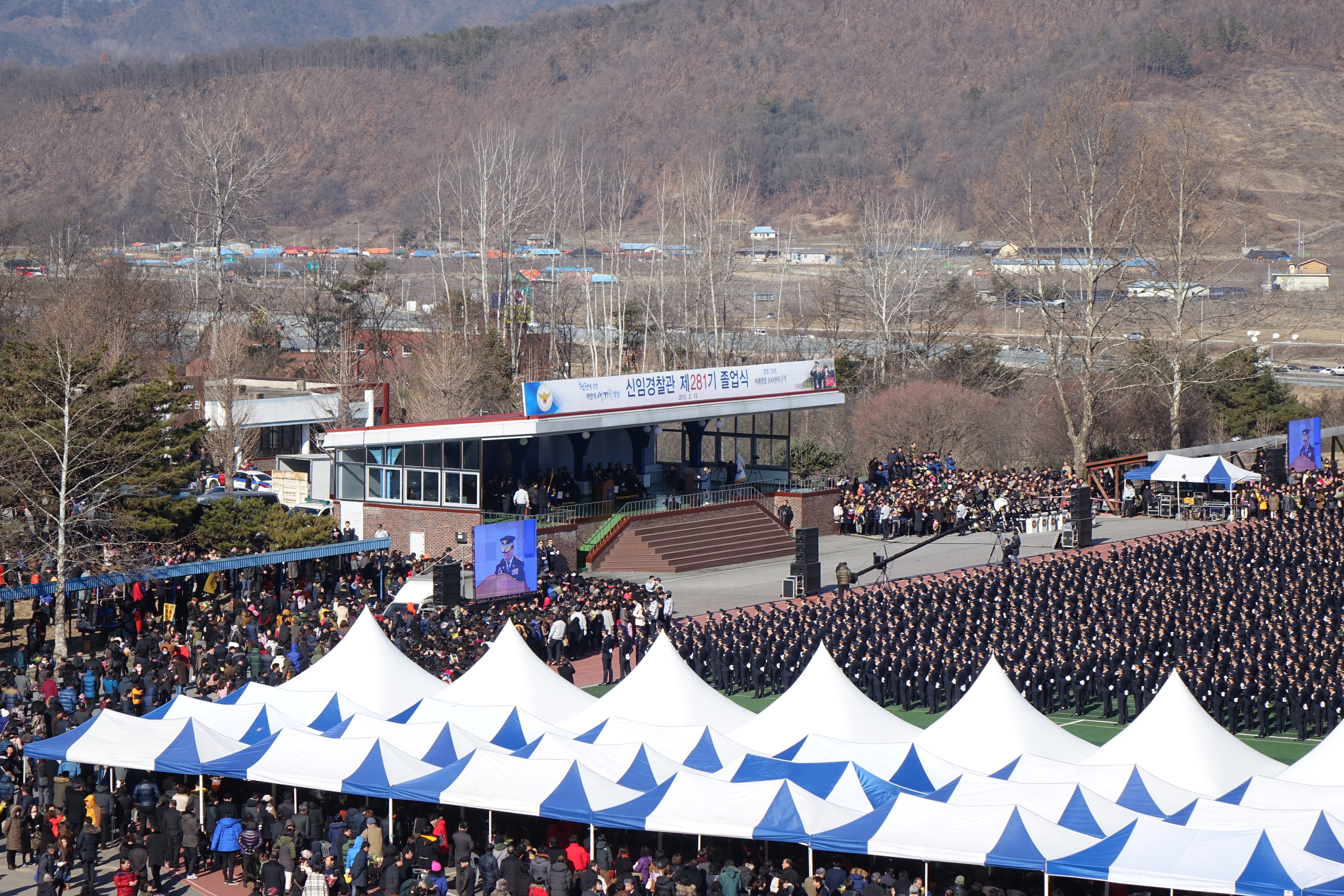
281st New Police Officer Graduation Ceremony.

The process of hiring as a police officer depends upon an individual's previous education and their desire to move into different ranks. To become a career police officer, all individuals must have a class one ordinary driver's license at minimum.

- Bar Exam: An administrative examination conducted at the Level 5 public recruitment (administration) or special recruitment level. In the case of police officers, a written test is required. Test subjects included in the written exam include Korean history and public administration. Those who take the special recruitment level test must conduct the exam on Korean history, criminal law, and criminal procedure law. The rank of appointment is a correction.
- Police academy recruits: Upon graduation these individuals are appointed as lieutenants to the NKPA.
- Police officer candidates: Previously they were trained at the national police academy. Since 2010, they have been trained at the Police Human Resources Development Institute, also known as the police education institute. It is the oldest police officer training system in Korea, and like the police academy graduates, recruits trained as officers are subsequently appointed as lieutenants upon graduation.
- General police officer recruitment: In addition to an open recruitment exam, individuals can be appointed as a police officer after completing the Department of Police Administration's riot police discharged person special recruitment at qualifying four year universities.

=== Gender equality ===
As of April 29, 2018, about 13,000 female police officers and 3,000 female general administrative staff members were employed at the KNPA. This constituted roughly 10.8% of all police officers. However, as of July 2018, there are sixteen female police officers ranked superintendent or higher. There is only one female police officer in the current position of superintendent of police or higher. In response to low female representation among police officers, the KNPA abolished the gender restriction ratio when recruiting police academy recruits and hiring police executive candidates. The government is expected to eliminate gender discrimination in police officer recruitment in the future.

== Equipment ==
=== Transportation ===
Korean police use various mobile devices to respond to security demands. The most common is a five-seater sedan. Where the local geography is either mountainous or an island, a sports utility vehicle (SUV) may also be used. In addition, motorcycles are used, and rotary wing aircraft are operated for aerial operations. Buses are used to transport police officers in large numbers.

The coast guard operates thirty five large boats, thirty nine medium boats, and 110 small boats. The coast guard also has 139 special ships, six fixed-wing aircraft and eighteen rotary-wing aircraft in order to respond to security demands at sea.

=== Firearms ===
Currently, South Korean police are allowed to carry 38-caliber pistols during operations. According to official data from the KNPA, the Smith & Wesson Model 10 is the service revolver recommended by the agency for police. However, this gun has become outdated, and firearm technology and policing trends have encouraged the adoption of the S&W Model 60 by many departments. This revolver has a reduced barrel and weight and uses 357 Magnum bullets..

== List of law enforcement organisations ==
=== National Organisations ===
- Ministry of the Interior and Safety
  - National Police Agency
- Ministry of Economy and Finance
  - National Tax Service
    - Investigation Bureau
    - International Taxation Bureau
  - Korea Customs Service
    - Audit Policy Bureau
    - Investigation and Surveillance Bureau
    - Information Management and International Affairs Bureau
- Ministry of Land, Infrastructure and Transport
  - Railway Police
- Ministry of Maritime Affairs and Fisheries
  - Korea Coast Guard (KCG; Korean: 해양경찰청; Sino-Korean word: 海洋警察廳, Revised Romanization: Haeyang-gyeongchal-cheong, literally translates to the "National Maritime Police Agency")
- Ministry of Justice
  - Prosecution Service
    - Provincial Prosecutors' Office
  - Korea Immigration Service
    - Border Control Division
    - Investigation & Enforcement Division
    - Intelligence Division
  - Korea Correctional Service
- National Intelligence Service (formerly the Korea Central Intelligence Agency [KCIA] and the Agency for National Security Planning [ANSP])

=== The Korean National Police Agency ===
KNPA leadership consists of one deputy commissioner general who oversees eight bureaus, nine offices, and thirty two divisions.

The Community Safety, Investigation, Traffic, and Foreign Affairs Bureaus are responsible for basic policing. Public Security, Intelligence, and National Security Bureaus govern public order. Spokesperson's Office, Planning and Coordination Office, Police Administration and Human Resources Office, Audit and Inspection Office, ICT and Equipment Policy Office, Scientific Investigation Office, and Police Situation Control Center provide administrative support.

Affiliated institutions include the Korean National Police University, Police Training Institute, Central Police Academy, Korean Police Investigation Academy and the National Police Hospital.

Furthermore, the Korean National Police is regionally divided over the 18 metropolitan areas and provinces, placing 255 stations, 518 precincts and 1,433 police boxes under metropolitan and provincial police agencies.

=== Provincial organisations ===
Provincial Police Agencies: Seoul, Busan, Daegu, Incheon, Daejeon, Gwangju, Ulsan, Gyeonggi Nambu, Gyeonggi Bukbu, Gangwon, Chungbuk, Chungnam, Jeonbuk, Jeonnam, Gyeongbuk, Gyeongnam, Jeju.

== See also ==
- Law of South Korea
