= William F. Dean =

United States Army Medal of Honor recipient

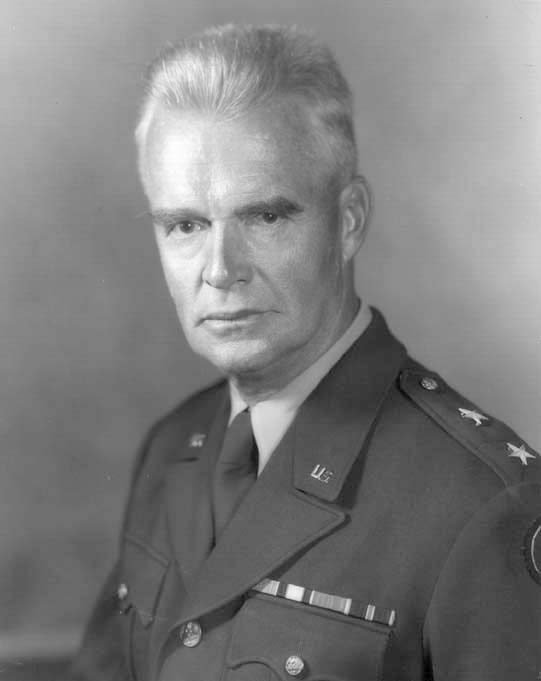
- Dean in 1950
- Born: William Frishe Dean; August 1, 1899; Carlyle, Illinois, U.S.
- Died: August 24, 1981 (aged 82); San Francisco, California, U.S.
- Burial place: San Francisco National Cemetery; San Francisco, California, U.S.
- Military career
- Allegiance: United States
- Branch: United States Army
- Service years: 1921–1955
- Rank: Major general
- Commands: 44th Infantry Division; 7th Infantry Division; 24th Infantry Division
- Conflicts: World War II; Operation Overlord; Siegfried Line campaign; Battle of the Bulge; Western Allied invasion of Germany; Operation Blacklist Forty; Occupation of Japan; Korean War; Jeju uprising; Battle of Taejon (POW); Operation Big Switch
- Awards: Medal of Honor; Distinguished Service Cross; Distinguished Service Medal; Legion of Merit; Bronze Star; Taegeuk Order of Military Merit

William Frishe Dean Sr. (August 1, 1899 – August 24, 1981) was a United States Army major general during World War II and the Korean War. He received the Medal of Honor for his actions on July 20 and 21, 1950 during the Battle of Daejon (Taejon) in South Korea. Dean also became the highest ranking American officer captured by an enemy force since the 18 American Army generals captured by Imperial Japan after the fall of the Philippines when he was captured by North Korea during the Korean War.

Dean attended the University of California at Berkeley before graduating with a commission in the US Army through the Reserve Officer's Training Corps (ROTC) in 1921. Slowly rising up the ranks in the inter-war years, Dean worked a desk job in Washington, D.C., for much of World War II before being transferred to the 44th Infantry Division which he commanded during the final days of the war, and was awarded a Distinguished Service Cross.

Dean commanded the 24th Infantry Division at the outbreak of the Korean War. Dean led the division for several weeks in successive delaying battles against the North Koreans before he led his division in making a last stand at Daejon. During the confused retreat from that city, Dean was separated from his soldiers and badly injured, and was eventually captured by the North Koreans. He remained in North Korean custody near Pyongyang for the remainder of the war. After the end of the conflict, Dean returned to the United States to a hero's welcome. He retired from the Army soon after and lived a quiet life until his death.

== Early life and education ==
Dean was born on August 1, 1899, in Carlyle, Illinois, to Charles Watts Dean, who worked as a dentist, and Elizabeth Frishe Dean, who was of German descent. William Dean had two siblings, a brother named David and a sister named Elizabeth. Dean states in his biography his interest in the military began at a very young age, upon seeing the United States Military Academy cadets in the 1904 Saint Louis Exposition performing military foot drill. During his childhood, Dean was interested in physical fitness, and began weightlifting and running, activities he would continue throughout much of his life. His first jobs included selling magazines for spending money. Growing up in Carlyle, Dean was the town's main paperboy for The Saturday Evening Post.

After graduating from high school, Dean applied to the US Military Academy, but was rejected. He then tried to enlist in the United States Army during World War I, but he was too young to do so without his parents' permission, and his mother refused. Dean instead attended University of California at Berkeley studying pre-law. During this time, he also took a variety of side jobs, including a stevedore at the San Francisco docks, a motorman, and briefly as a patrolman for the Berkeley Police Department, where he worked under police chief August Vollmer. Dean originally sought to attain a Doctor of Law degree but only completed a Bachelor of Arts degree from Berkeley in 1922 before joining the Army.

== Early military career ==
Dean, who had been a member of Berkeley's ROTC, was commissioned as a second lieutenant in the California Army National Guard in 1921, before being given an active duty commission in the infantry on October 13, 1923. His first assignment was to the US 38th Infantry Regiment, 3rd Infantry Division at Fort Douglas, Utah. During this posting, Dean took an interest in polo ponies, owning and training several of his own.

Dean was moved to the Panama Canal Zone in 1926, coaching boxing and basketball teams though not competing himself. Dean returned to Fort Douglas in 1929 before attending the United States Army Infantry School at Fort Benning, Georgia and then serving with a tank battalion before taking a course at the tank school. In 1932, Dean was assigned to the US 30th Infantry Regiment, 3rd Infantry Division on the US West Coast. During this time, Dean also served in the Civilian Conservation Corps (CCC) as commander of Camp Hackamore in northern California. Dean was then moved to the CCC headquarters in Redding, California.

Following these appointments, Dean attended the US Army Command and General Staff College at Fort Leavenworth, Kansas before being assigned to a post on Oahu, Hawaii for two years. Following this stint, Dean attended the Armed Forces Industrial College at Fort McNair, Washington, D.C., and then the field officer's course at the Chemical Warfare school in the United States Army War College at Carlisle Barracks. Dean was promoted to captain in 1936, and major in 1940. Upon this promotion, Dean was assigned to Washington, D.C., on the United States Department of War on the General Staff, first as a junior member, then as assistant secretary, then as executive officer in the Requirement Division of the Ground Forces Headquarters, a department concerned with the acquisition of new weapons and electronics, and training literature.

== World War II ==
Following the United States' entry into World War II, Dean was promoted to the temporary rank of lieutenant colonel in 1941, and colonel in 1942. He was promoted to brigadier general in December of that year and made head of the Requirements Division in 1943. He held this office only briefly, before being assigned as assistant commander of the US 44th Infantry Division, under Major Generals James I. Muir and Robert L. Spragins beginning in late 1943. The division was to sail for the European Theater and Dean went with them despite being injured shortly before departure in a flamethrower accident which claimed the lives of two other soldiers.

=== Normandy to the Bulge ===
The 44th Infantry Division landed in France via Omaha Beach on September 15, 1944. It trained for a month before entering combat on October 18, 1944, when it relieved the US 79th Infantry Division in the vicinity of Foret de Parroy, east of Luneville, to take part in the Seventh United States Army drive to secure several passes in the Vosges Mountains. The division was hit by a heavy counterattack by forces of Nazi Germany on October 25–26. The attack was repulsed and the 44th remained in the sector for several weeks. On November 13, 1944, it attacked northeast, advancing through the Vosges Mountains east of Leintrey to Dossenheim, and capturing Avricourt, on November 17. The division then pushed on to liberate Strasbourg with the French 2nd Armored Division. After regrouping, the 44th Infantry Division returned to the attack, taking Ratzwiller and entering the Ensemble de Bitche along the Maginot Line.

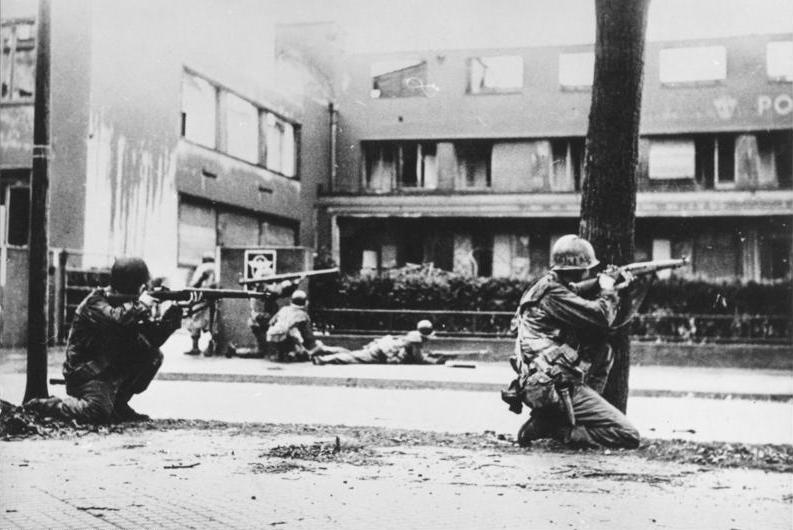
US 44th Infantry Division troops fighting at Mannheim, Germany in 1945.

When division commander Major General Robert L. Spragins was injured and relieved of command in December 1944, Dean was promoted to command the division. That month, the division was caught up in the German Army offensive in the Alsace, known as Operation Nordwind. Fort Simserhof was captured by the Germans on December 19 and the 44th Infantry Division was forced to retreat to defensive positions east of Sarreguemines. On December 21–23, the 44th threw back three attempts by the Germans to cross the Blies River. An aggressive defense of the Sarreguemines area was continued throughout February and most of March 1945, when Dean was promoted to major general.

=== Invasion of Germany ===
The division moved across the Rhine River at Worms, Germany on March 26, in the wake of the 3rd Infantry Division. The 44th relieved the 3rd on March 26–27 and crossed the Neckar River to attack and capture Mannheim, Germany on March 28–29. Shifting to the west bank of the Main River, the division crossed that river at Grosse Auheim in early April, and engaged in a three-week period of training. Returning to the lines, the division resumed its attack on April 18 in conjunction with the US 10th Armored Division, the 44th took Ehingen on April 23, crossed the Danube River. It then attacked southeast into Austria, taking Füssen, Berg, and Wertach as part of a drive to Imst. Pursuing the disintegrating German forces through Fern Pass and into Inn Valley, the 44th was in Imst by May 4. The city of Landeck surrendered on May 5. The 19th German Army had surrendered at Innsbruck the same day, and the division was involved in processing German prisoners until V-E Day on May 8. Dean's troops took 30,000 prisoners of war in the surrender of the German army. Dean was awarded the Distinguished Service Cross, the Legion of Merit, and the Army Distinguished Service Medal for his leadership of the division during the war.

After a short period of occupation duty, the 44th Infantry Division returned to the United States in July 1945 where it began training for deployment to the Pacific Theater. As part of Operation Coronet it was intended that Dean would lead the division during the planned invasion of Honshū, but the war came to an end before this took place and the operation was subsequently cancelled. Dean then oversaw the drawdown of the division until he was relieved of command on November 1, 1945. The 44th Infantry Division was disbanded by the end of that month, and Dean was assigned to Fort Leavenworth again to organize and direct command classes.

== Korean War ==
In October 1947, Dean was appointed the commander of military forces in South Korea, deputy to Lieutenant General John R. Hodge, commander of the United States Army Military Government in Korea (USAMGIK). This job was temporary as the US forces transitioned the South Koreans to independence. Headquartered in Seoul, Dean maintained political control of the country until August 15, 1948, when the new South Korean government was elected and the occupation ended. Dean was then made commander of the US 7th Infantry Division, overseeing its movement from South Korea to bases in Japan as part of the Occupation of Japan. By January 1949, Dean and his division were in Sapporo, Japan on the island of Hokkaido. He was moved to Yokohama in May 1949 to serve as chief of staff to the Eighth United States Army under Lieutenant General Walton Walker. In October 1949 Dean returned to division command when he took command of the US 24th Infantry Division in Kokura, Kyushu.

=== Jeju uprising ===
Through his role in the USAMGIK, Dean oversaw the initial suppression of the Jeju uprising, a prolonged armed uprising which broke out on April 3, 1948, largely in protest to the Division of Korea and moves to establish a separate government in the South. The Workers' Party of South Korea and its supporters launched the insurgency by attacking the police. Northwest Youth League members stationed on Jeju mobilized to violently suppress the uprising. In less than a month after the uprising began, a peace agreement had been reached between resistance leader Kim Dal-sam and Jeju constabulary commander Kim Ik-ryeol. However this agreement was rejected by Dean who soon after fired Kim Ik-ryeol and replaced him with the more compliant Pak Chin-gyŏng. Dean subsequently ordered a purge of suspected sympathizers of the Workers' Party of South Korea from the Korean Constabulary culminating in the summary execution of three sergeants. His role in Korea ended in August 1948, with the independence of the First Republic of Korea under President Syngman Rhee who escalated the suppression of the uprising after independence, declaring martial law in November and beginning an "eradication campaign" against rebel forces in the rural areas of Jeju in March 1949, defeating them within two months. 30,000 people were killed in total during the uprising including at least 14,373 civilians.

=== Delaying action ===
When you get to Pusan, head for Taejon. We want to stop the North Koreans as far from Pusan as we can. Block the main road as far north as possible. Make contact with General Church. If you can't find him, go to Taejon and beyond if you can. Sorry I can't give you more information—that's all I've got. Good luck, and God bless you and your men!

— Dean's orders to Task Force Smith.

At the outbreak of the Korean War on June 25, 1950, Dean's division was the closest US ground unit to the Korean Peninsula. General of the Army Douglas MacArthur ordered Walker to deploy the division to South Korea as quickly as possible to resist the advancing forces of North Korea. Dean was ordered to send an advance battalion from his division by air to South Korea with a mission to advance and resist leading elements of the North Korean People's Army in an effort to delay them as much as possible while the remainder of the division followed by sea. Dean was given command of all US forces in Korea, and his division numbered 15,965 men and 4,773 vehicles at the time. On July 1, Dean organized the 406-man Task Force Smith from components of the US 21st Infantry Regiment and ordered it into Korea, as the advance force. As Task Force Smith advanced, Dean himself landed in Daejon on July 3 and set up his command post with Brigadier General John H. Church, the Assistant Division Commander, and Brigadier General George B. Barth, the Division Artillery commander, as his deputies. Dean ordered Barth forward to act as his forward commander for Task Force Smith, which began digging in at Osan to resist North Korean troops advancing after the capture of Seoul. Task Force Smith was subsequently defeated by North Koreans at the Battle of Osan the next day, and pushed back.

With the defeat of Task Force Smith, Dean ordered the US 34th Infantry Regiment and other elements of the division to conduct delaying actions south of Osan, but he was disappointed and frustrated by the result. The 34th Infantry was badly defeated in the Battle of Pyongtaek where it only briefly resisted the North Koreans before retreating in disarray. Dean was angered by the poor performance of the 34th Infantry Regiment during the battle. He allegedly was upset that the regiment retreated so quickly without attempting to further delay the North Koreans. He considered ordering the regiment back north immediately but did not do so fearing the unit would be ambushed. Dean replaced the commander of the 34th Infantry, Colonel Jay B. Lovless, and ordered the 3rd Battalion back north, but when it encountered North Korean resistance it immediately became disorganized and was forced to withdraw. The North Koreans outnumbered Dean's troops, and the US forces had no weapons heavy enough to destroy the North Korean T-34 tanks.

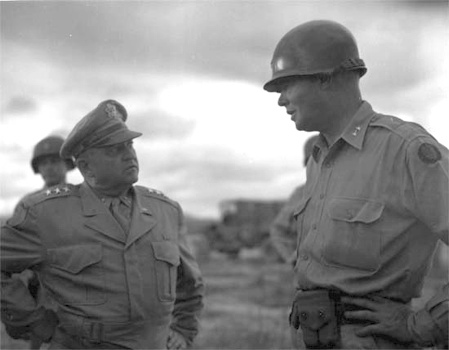
Dean (right) talks with Walton Walker (left) at an airfield near Taejon, July 7, 1950.

Following the retreat from Pyongtaek, the scattered 1st Battalion, 34th Infantry retreated to Chonan, where the rest of the 34th Infantry Regiment was located. L Company of the 3rd Battalion, 34th Infantry was ordered to probe north of the city and meet the advancing elements of the North Korean 4th Infantry Division which was advancing following its two victories. Dean telegraphed the command from Taejon, ordering the rest of 3rd Battalion, 34th Infantry to move up behind L Company. Former regimental commander Lovless moved north to join L Company, along with newly arrived Colonel Robert R. Martin, a friend of Dean's. Around 18:00, Dean ordered Martin to take command of the 34th Infantry Regiment from Lovless. The next morning, July 8, Dean and Walker arrived to see the outcome of the Battle of Chonan which had begun in the night. They discovered Martin had been killed and the regiment again defeated and fleeing in disarray. He ordered it back to the Kum River. Dean ordered the rest of the 21st Infantry to conduct one final delaying action, and in the Battle of Chochiwon from July 10–12 it delayed the North Koreans before being defeated and forced back to the Kum River.

=== Daejon ===
On July 12, Dean ordered the division's three regiments—the 19th, 21st and 34th Infantry—to cross the Kum River, destroying all bridges behind them, and to establish defensive positions around Daejon. Dean formed a line with the 34th and 19th Infantry facing east, and held the heavily-battered 21st in reserve to the southeast. Daejon stood as a major transportation hub between Seoul and Daegu, giving it great strategic value for both sides. The division was attempting to make a stand at Daejon, the last place it could conduct a delaying action before the North Korean forces could converge on the unfinished Busan Perimeter (Pusan Perimeter).

The 24th’s three regiments, which had a wartime strength of 3,000 each, were already below strength on their deployment, and heavy losses in the preceding two weeks had reduced their numbers further. The 21st had 1,100 men left, having suffered 1,433 casualties. The 34th had only 2,020 and the 19th had 2,276 men. There were another 2,007 men in the 24th Infantry Division artillery formations. Thus the division's total strength was 11,400. This was severely reduced from the 15,965 men and 4,773 vehicles that had arrived in Korea at the beginning of the month.

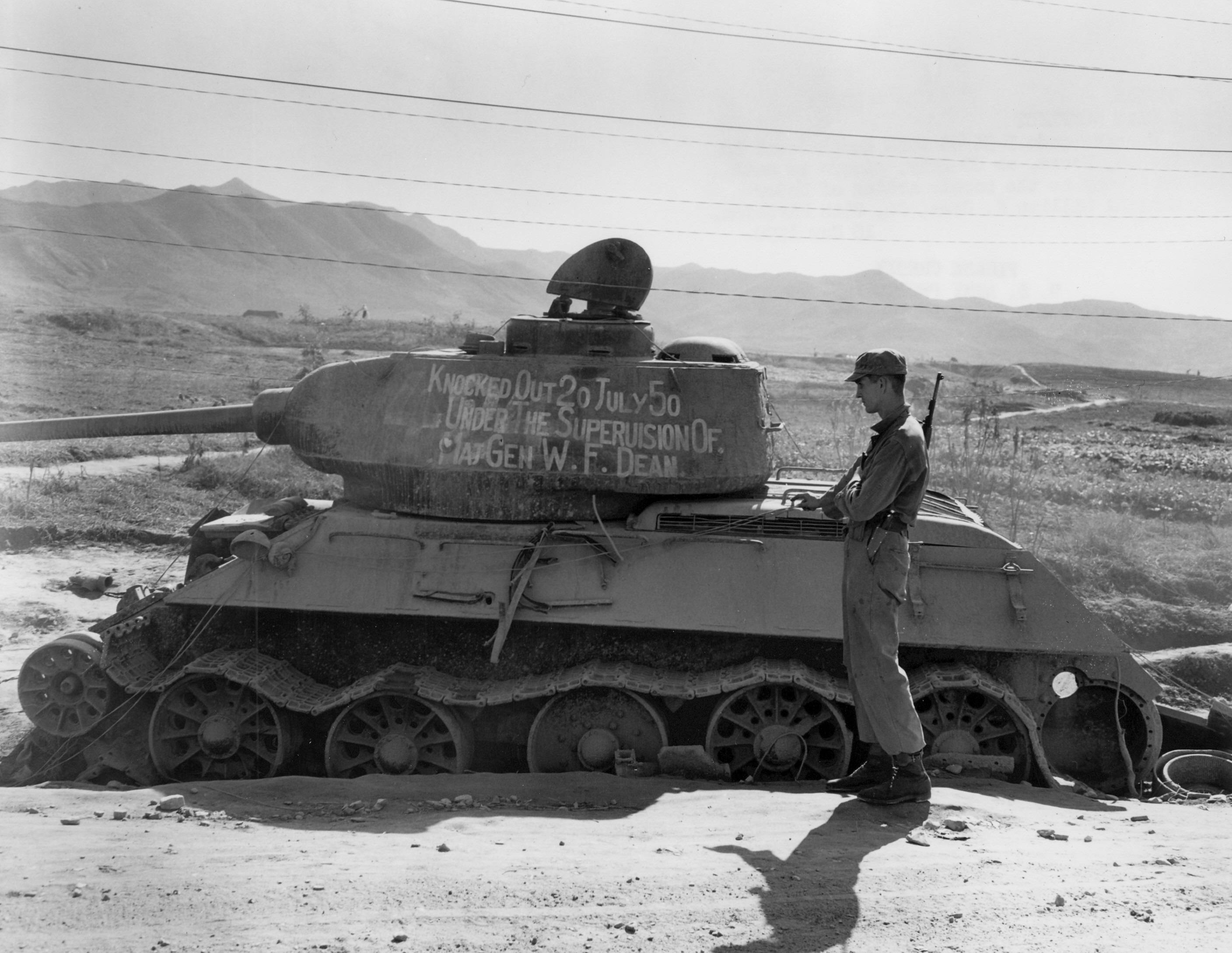
The T-34 knocked out by Dean's soldiers on July 20, 1950

The 19th and 34th engaged the North Korean 3rd Division and 4th Division at the Kum River, just west of Daejon. Between July 13 and July 16, the two regiments suffered 650 casualties among the 3,401 men committed there. On July 18, Walker ordered Dean to hold Daejon until July 20 so that the US 1st Cavalry Division and US 25th Infantry Division could establish defensive lines along the Naktong River, forming the Pusan Perimeter.

The North Koreans then moved against Daejon. On July 19, North Korean forces entered Daejon, the site of the 24th Infantry Division's headquarters. Dean personally led the division in its stand at Daejon. The North Koreans quickly surrounded the city and moved in from the west, north and south.

For two days, the 34th Infantry fought the advancing North Koreans in bitter house-to-house fighting. North Korean soldiers continued to infiltrate the city, often disguised as farmers. The remaining elements of the 24th Infantry were pushed back block by block. Without radios, and unable to communicate with the remaining elements of the division, Dean joined the men on the front lines, hunting the T-34 tanks with the help of the new shaped-charge, armor-piercing 3.5 inch "Super Bazookas", which had only been put into production two weeks before the war. At one point, Dean personally attacked a tank with a hand grenade, destroying it. He also repeatedly directed the fire of US armor in the city while being exposed to North Korean fire. American forces pulled back gradually after suffering heavy losses, allowing the North Korean 3rd and 4th Divisions to move on the city freely from the north, south, and west roads. The 24th Infantry Division repeatedly attempted to establish its defensive lines, but was repeatedly pushed back by the numerically superior enemy.

=== Capture ===
At the end of the day on July 20, Dean ordered the headquarters of the 34th Infantry to withdraw. Dean remained behind and assisted the US troops in evacuating the city until the last convoy was ready to leave Daejon. As the last convoy of troops moved out of the city and fought through a North Korean roadblock, Dean, with a small force of soldiers, followed them. At the edge of the city, the final elements of the 34th, leaving the city in 50 vehicles, were ambushed and many of their vehicles were destroyed by machine guns and mortars, forcing the Americans to retreat on foot. In the ensuing fight, Dean's jeep made a wrong turn and was separated from the rest of the American forces.

Dean's small force eventually made it out of the city past several North Korean roadblocks. Just outside the city Dean stopped his jeep to tend to several wounded US soldiers in a wrecked truck in the ditch. However, as they attempted to escape further they ran into another North Korean roadblock and were forced to continue on foot, crossing the Taejon River and climbing a nearby mountain. In the confusion, Dean was separated from the group.

While seeking water for a wounded man, Dean fell down a steep slope and was knocked unconscious. When he regained consciousness he found he had a gashed head, a broken shoulder, and many bruises. Alone and attempting to reach friendly forces, he met First Lieutenant Stanley Tabor from the 19th Infantry Regiment, his division. On July 26, 1950, they were discovered by the enemy who attempted to capture them. Dean escaped through Tabor's devotion and ended up alone again.

For 36 days, Dean wandered alone in the mountains trying to reach safety, going without food and medical treatment. The 6 foot (1.8 m) tall Dean, who had weighed 210 pounds (95 kg) before the war was reduced to 130 pounds (59 kg) as he wandered for the next month. On August 25, two South Koreans who pretended to be guiding him toward safety led him into a prearranged ambush of North Korean soldiers at Chinan, 35 miles (56 km) south of Taejon and 65 miles (105 km) west of Taegu. Dean attempted to fight the North Koreans with his sidearm to make them kill him, but they easily took the weakened Dean prisoner.

By July 22, with Dean still missing, the Eighth Army appointed Church commander of the 24th Infantry Division and promoted him to major general. Dean was widely believed to have been killed until October 1950, when US forces captured a North Korean soldier named Lee Kyu-hyun (이규현) near Pyongyang. Lee had been assigned to live with Dean for a month as an interpreter. Lee was interviewed throughout late 1950 but US military leaders still generally thought Dean was dead.

=== Imprisonment ===
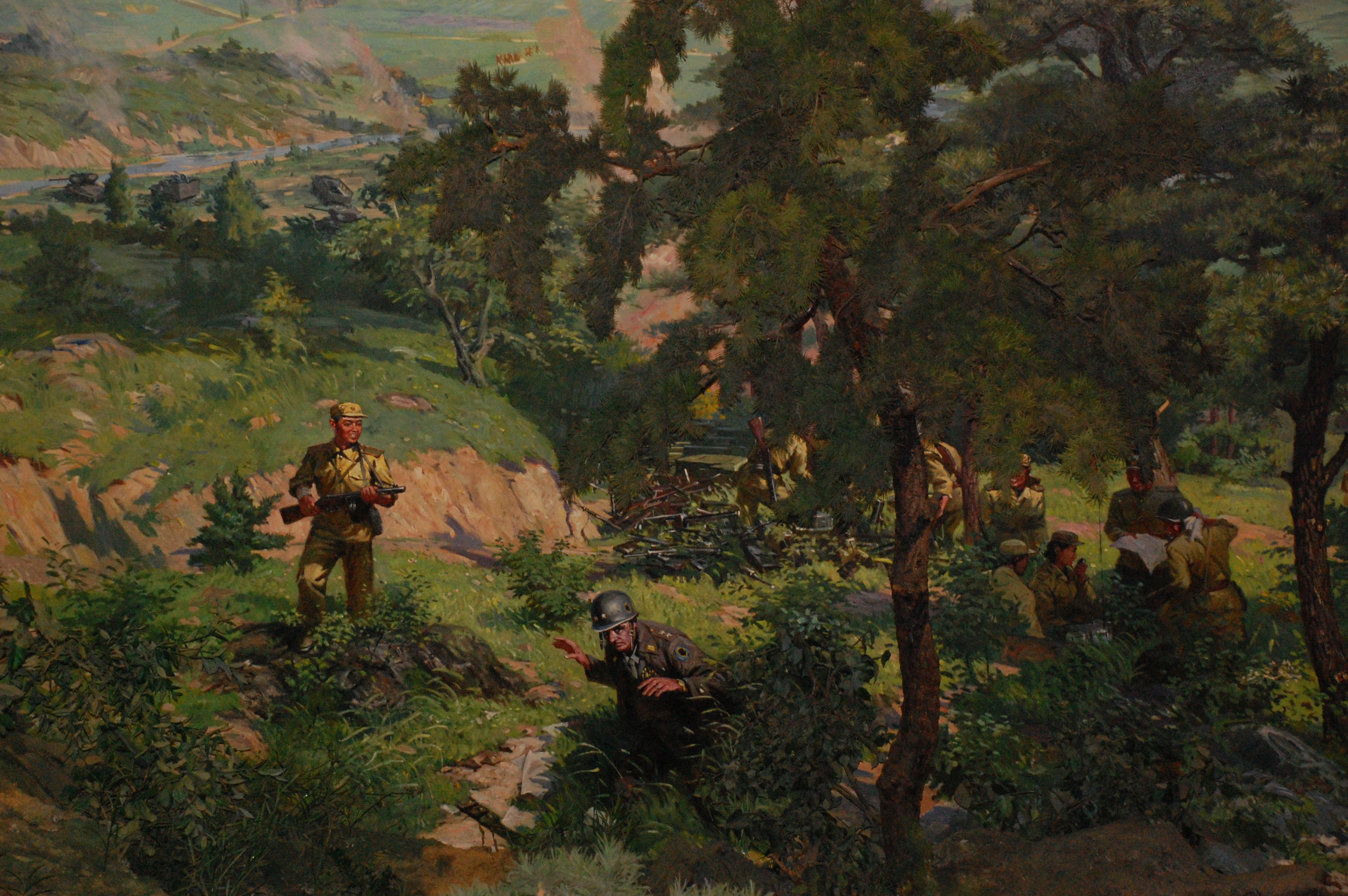
Depiction of Dean's capture by the Korean People's Army at the Battle of Taejon Panorama inside the Victorious Fatherland Liberation War Museum in Pyongyang.

Dean was taken to a local police headquarters and kept in a cage overnight. North Korean troops were initially not aware of his identity. Dean was taken to a prison camp in Suwon where he was given food and medical treatment, but he began suffering from diarrhea and dysentery. Dean was then transported to the main North Korean prisoner of war camp in Seoul with other American prisoners. He attempted to keep his identity a secret but he was quickly recognized by a South Korean administrator who had worked under him before the war. Dean was moved to Pyongyang and given a larger living quarters in an underground North Korean facility. He remained sick owing to poorly prepared food.

As UN air raids against the North Koreans intensified, Dean was moved to Sunan, north of Pyongyang, to a hut where he lived with several guards. They began daily interrogations primarily aimed at forcing military intelligence from him or making him sign a written condemnation of the UN intervention in Korea, but Dean adamantly refused to do so. Senior North Korean military leaders continued such interrogations through October 1950 but eventually gave up when Dean would not cooperate and was not intimidated by their threats. Dean continued to suffer from illness related to poor food but he was not given another interpreter and was not interrogated after October 1950. North Korean leaders had threatened to harm Dean if he did not cooperate but he was never actually tortured. Dean took to playing chess with his guards often and he was allowed to exercise daily. He was kept alone, however, and was never with other American prisoners for the remainder of his confinement. Dean later wrote extensively of his capture and imprisonment in his 1954 autobiography, General Dean's Story. He claimed the North Koreans considered him a war criminal and had many discussions with him about the problems with capitalism in the United States.

Dean later said he had tried to commit suicide because he feared he would break under torture and divulge critical intelligence to the North Koreans, such as the plans for Operation Chromite, of which he had been aware. Still he remained defiant during interrogations, refusing to divulge any information and acting unafraid, sometimes laughing off threats. He was given better treatment than most UN prisoners in North Korea, as he was regularly fed and rarely subjected to interrogations after his initial capture. He tried several times to escape but failed in doing so. He may have been moved to Manpo when the UN forces took Pyongyang, and returned when the Chinese People's Volunteer Army entered the war and forced the UN forces back.

Dean had no contact with the outside world until he was interviewed on 21 December 1951, by an Australian journalist, Wilfred Burchett, who was a war correspondent for Ce soir, a French Left-wing newspaper. Burchett's interview with Dean's photograph was published worldwide on 24 December 1951. It was the first time Dean was definitively confirmed alive and as a prisoner to the rest of the world. Dean recounted the incident in his autobiography with the title, "My friend Wilfred Burchett." From Burchett's visit to the end of the war, Dean claimed in his autobiography he was visited by numerous news correspondents. He claimed to have lived the remainder of his time as a prisoner in relative comfort. After the July 27, 1953, Armistice Agreement, Dean remained in North Korea as a prisoner of war for several more weeks while the armistice was worked out. He was returned to the UN forces at Panmunjom during Operation Big Switch on September 4, 1953 and finally returned to US on September 24, 1953.

=== Huichon ===
After his release from North Korean custody, Dean wrote that, "the town of Huichon amazed me. The city I'd seen before―two-storied buildings, a prominent main street―wasn't there any more." He also encountered "the 'unoccupied shells' of town after town, and villages where rubble or 'snowy open spaces' were all that remained."

== Later life and death ==
When Dean returned to the United States, he received a hero's welcome and was presented with a number of decorations, including the Medal of Honor, which he was unaware he had been awarded. Dean maintained he did not think his own experience was particularly heroic and asserted he did not feel he deserved an award for his actions in Korea. He was given a ticker-tape parade in New York City on his return to the US on October 26, 1953, and he was made the grand marshal of the Tournament of Roses Parade on January 1, 1954.

Three months after his return from Korea, Dean was assigned as the Deputy Commanding General of the Sixth United States Army at the Presidio of San Francisco in California. Dean held this post for two years until he retired from active duty on the 31st of October in 1955. Upon retirement Dean was awarded the Combat Infantryman Badge for his front line service in World War II and Korea; general officers are not usually eligible, since they are not usually participants in front line combat, and Dean was only the second general to receive the award. Other generals who received the Combat Infantryman Badge were Douglas MacArthur, Omar Bradley and Joseph Stilwell.

Dean lived a quiet life in San Francisco after retirement. He died on August 24, 1981, aged 82, and was buried in San Francisco National Cemetery in the Presidio of San Francisco and next to his wife.

== Personal life ==
Dean met Mildred Dern of Salt Lake City, Utah, when one of Dern's friends was injured in a fall from one of Dean's polo ponies during his tour between 1923 and 1926 at Fort Douglas. The two were married in 1926. The couple had two children, Majorie June Dean, born in 1927, and William Dean Jr., born 1929. June married Robert Williams, a US Army Captain, while William Jr. attended West Point Academy in 1950. William Dean Jr. served in the United States Forces Korea (Air Force, Kunsan Air Base). In 1963, he visited at the house of the farmer, Park Jong-goo who provided shelter to William F. Dean after Battle of Taejon and conveyed heartiest appreciation to Park Jong-goo.

Dean maintained an athletic lifestyle for much of his life, picking up weightlifting and running when he was young, coaching basketball and, in his later years, he played tennis. He maintained a steady athletic regimen for the majority of his life, even insisting upon it during his imprisonment.

In his later life, Dean maintained a self-deprecating outlook on his actions in Korea and maintained he did not feel he deserved the Medal of Honor. Of his time in Korea, Dean later said, "I wouldn't have awarded myself a wooden star for what I did as a commander." In his autobiography, he opted instead to highlight the command decisions he regretted making and contend, "There were heroes in Korea, but I was not one of them."

== Awards and decorations ==
Dean was decorated numerous times for his World War II and Korean War service. These awards are now on display at the University of California, Berkeley.

Badge	Combat Infantryman Badge (Second Award, Honorary)		
1st row	Medal of Honor		
2nd row	Distinguished Service Cross	Army Distinguished Service Medal	Legion of Merit
3rd row	Bronze Star Medal	Prisoner of War Medal	American Defense Service Medal
4th row	American Campaign Medal	European-African-Middle Eastern Campaign Medal with 5 service stars	World War II Victory Medal
5th row	Army of Occupation Medal with Japan campaign clasp	National Defense Service Medal	Korean Service Medal with service star
6th row	Korean Order of National Security Merit	United Nations Service Medal for Korea	Korean War Service Medal (Note: In 2000, award of the Korean War Service Medal was made retroactive to all US military who served in the Korean War.)
Unit awards	Presidential Unit Citation		Republic of Korea Presidential Unit Citation
Badges	24th Infantry Division SSI-FWTS		44th Infantry Division SSI-FWTS

=== Medal of Honor citation ===
In 1951, Congress voted to award Dean the Medal of Honor for his actions during the defense of Taejon. The Medal was presented by US President Harry S. Truman on 9 January 1951,(Department of the Army, General Orders No. 7, February 16, 1951) to Dean's wife, son William Dean Jr. and daughter Marjorie June Dean. Dean himself was still reported missing in action in Korea and thought to be dead.

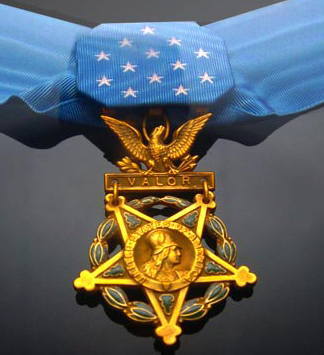

William F. Dean
Rank and organization: Major General, U.S. Army, commanding general, 24th Infantry Division
Place and date: Taejon, Korea, 20 and July 21, 1950
Entered service at: California. Born: August 1, 1899, Carlyle, Ill
G.O. No.: 7, February 16, 1951.

Citation:

Maj. Gen. Dean distinguished himself by conspicuous gallantry and intrepidity at the repeated risk of his life above and beyond the call of duty. In command of a unit suddenly relieved from occupation duties in Japan and as yet untried in combat, faced with a ruthless and determined enemy, highly trained and overwhelmingly superior in numbers, he felt it his duty to take action which to a man of his military experience and knowledge was clearly apt to result in his death. He personally and alone attacked an enemy tank while armed only with a hand grenade. He also directed the fire of his tanks from an exposed position with neither cover nor concealment while under observed artillery and small-arms fire. When the town of Taejon was finally overrun he refused to insure his own safety by leaving with the leading elements but remained behind organizing his retreating forces, directing stragglers, and was last seen assisting the wounded to a place of safety. These actions indicate that Maj. Gen. Dean felt it necessary to sustain the courage and resolution of his troops by examples of excessive gallantry committed always at the threatened portions of his frontlines. The magnificent response of his unit to this willing and cheerful sacrifice, made with full knowledge of its certain cost, is history. The success of this phase of the campaign is in large measure due to Maj. Gen. Dean's heroic leadership, courageous and loyal devotion to his men, and his complete disregard for personal safety.

== Dates of rank ==
Insignia	Rank	Component	Date
	Second Lieutenant	Regular Army	July 3, 1923
	First Lieutenant	Regular Army	November 8, 1928
	Captain	Regular Army	August 1, 1935
	Major	Regular Army	July 3, 1940
	Lieutenant Colonel	Army of the United States	December 24, 1941
	Colonel	Army of the United States	August 21, 1942
	Brigadier General	Army of the United States	December 10, 1942
	Major General	Army of the United States	March 19, 1945
	Lieutenant Colonel	Regular Army	July 3, 1946
	Colonel	Regular Army	June 10, 1948
	Brigadier General	Regular Army	October 1, 1949
	Major General	Regular Army	May 23, 1952
	Major General	Retired List	November 1, 1955

== Legacy ==
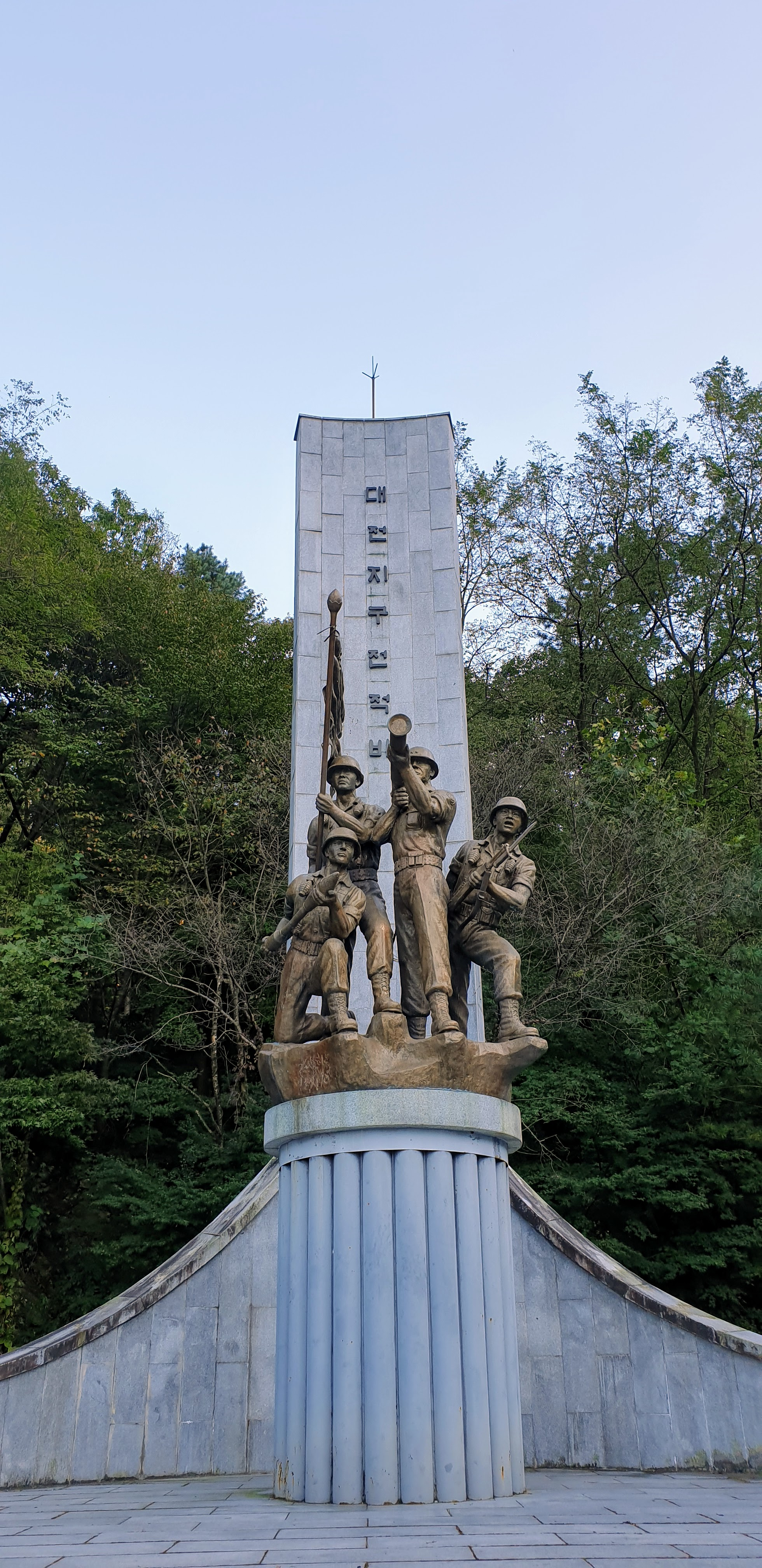
The Battle of Taejon Memorial in Daejeon, South Korea depicts General Dean at the moment when he was shooting at North Korean tanks

Dean was the highest ranking UN prisoner of war of the Korean War. He was also the highest ranking Medal of Honor recipient during the Korean War. His story of capture and imprisonment by the North Koreans was recorded by numerous publications. His initial capture was covered by Life Magazine in July 1950 with a photo essay detailing his life. In December 1951, when he was discovered to be alive, TIME Magazine did an article on his story and imprisonment, featuring an image of him on the magazine's front cover. He subsequently received more attention from the press. Multiple media outlets attempted to interview Dean but the North Koreans rarely allowed it. Few photos and little information on his status was released, mostly that which showed him in good condition. After his release, Dean's story, as well as Lee's, was told in Life Magazine.

Dean was memorialized in several ways for his actions. The T-34 tank Dean knocked out remained where it was destroyed in Taejon until 1977 as a memorial to the fight. When the city of Daejeon built a Battle of Taejon memorial in 1981 they decided to include a statue that depicted Dean when he was firing his bazooka at North Korean tanks. In his hometown of Carlyle, a newly renovated bridge was named the General Dean Suspension Bridge in 1953. It was placed on the National Register of Historic Places in 1973. After Dean's death, his uniform and personal items were donated to the University of California at Berkeley ROTC program. The ROTC created a memorial for Dean in the Hearst Gym on campus, designating Room 155 "The Dean Room." Dean's uniform and medals, including his Medal of Honor, have been housed there. The university's Cal Alumni Association also selected Dean as their 1953 "Alumnus of the Year."

== See also ==
- List of Medal of Honor recipients
- List of Korean War Medal of Honor recipients

== Citations ==
=== Bibliography ===
- Alexander, Bevin (2003), Korea: The First War We Lost, New York: Hippocrene Books, ISBN 978-0-7818-1019-7
- Appleman, Roy E. (1998), South to the Naktong, North to the Yalu: United States Army in the Korean War, Washington, DC: Department of the Army, ISBN 978-0-16-001918-0, archived from the original on 2013-11-02
- Dean, William F. (1973), General Dean's Story, London: Greenwood Press, ISBN 978-0-8371-6690-2 (Originally published in 1954 by Viking Press)
- Ecker, Richard E. (2004), Battles of the Korean War: A Chronology, with Unit-by-Unit United States Casualty Figures & Medal of Honor Citations, Jefferson, NC: McFarland & Company, ISBN 978-0-7864-1980-7
- Fehrenbach, T.R. (2001) [1994], This Kind of War: The Classic Korean War History (Fiftieth Anniversary ed.), Washington, DC: Potomac Books, ISBN 978-1-57488-334-3
- Gugeler, Russell A. (2005), Combat Actions in Korea, Honolulu: University Press of the Pacific, ISBN 978-1-4102-2451-4
- Malkasian, Carter (2001), The Korean War, Oxford: Osprey Publishing, ISBN 978-1-84176-282-1
- Millett, Allan R. (2010), The War for Korea, 1950–1951: They Came from the North, Lawrence, Kansas: University Press of Kansas, ISBN 978-0-7006-1709-8
- Varhola, Michael J. (2000), Fire and Ice: The Korean War, 1950–1953, Mason City, Iowa: Da Capo Press, ISBN 978-1-882810-44-4
- Young, Gordon Russell (1959), Army Almanac: A Book of Facts Concerning the Army of the United States, Mechanicsburg, Pennsylvania: Stackpole Books, ASIN B0006D8NKK

Military offices
Preceded by Robert L. Spragins	Commanding General 44th Infantry Division; January–September 1945	Succeeded by Post deactivated
Preceded by Edwin W. Piburn	Commanding General 7th Infantry Division; January–June 1951	Succeeded by David G. Barr
