= Covert missions during the Korean War =

The Korean War Covert Missions were covert missions performed to assist in ending The Korean War, which took place from 1950 to 1953.

== Missions ==
- Operation Blossom- Early 1950s mission that used North Korean refugees to go in and create a resistance. This was a failed operation.
- Operation Boxer I- The purpose of this 1953 operation was to disrupt the transportation of supplies being shipped via railway from the Soviet Union to North Korea.
- Operation Boxer II- This mission was to interrupt the transportation of the supplies around Yongdae-ri. The mission was deemed successful
- Operation Boxer III-Little information is known about this operation.
- Operation Boxer IV- The mission here was located near Hungman and is claimed successful.
- Operation Broken Reed- This 1952 mission was done by the orders of Harry Truman because he wanted as much information as possible about the then People's Republic of China. Much information was received about China and the Soviet Union's involvement with North Korea and the mission was deemed successful.
- Operation Camel- This operation took place after the end of the war and the goal of this mission was to try to disturb any North Korean government officials.
- Operation Chromite- This operation, also known as Incheon Landing, was essential to the South's success in the war.
- Operation Green Dragon- This was a large mission that took place with the group, Combined Command Reconnaissance Activities Korea. The people involved would be parachuted down and create a station for future missions. Some of the people involved were trapped behind enemy lines and were never recovered.
- Operation Haul Ass-In 1954, this operation was completed to rescue members who had been captured during a previous mission Operation Beehive.
- Operation Hurricane- The mission was to come in contact with an alley in the area of Anju.
- Operation Jesse James- The goal of this was to augment some of the Donkey units that were present at the time and had to be in three trials.
- Operation Leopard- This was a mission to stop the flow of people fleeing North Korea into Chinese territories.
- Operation Mustang I- This operation was made to capture prisoners of war. This was the first of many mustang operations and was canceled.
- Operation Mustang II- This also was an operation to rescue POWs and one specific, Major General William F. Dean. The mission was canceled because of intel that may have proved the plan was already known.
- Operation Mustang III- They were to contact Operation Leopard and try to communicate with and capture POWs.·
- Operation Mustang IV- This sixteen crew mission was to dismantle a railroad that would cut some necessary supplies. This mission was considered a failure.
- Operation Mustang V- This mission was to find an escape route for the prisoners but they were not heard from after they were dropped from the plane.
- Operation Mustang VI- In route to rescue POWS, the parties of this operation lost contact.
- Operation Mustang VII- This mission was to rescue POWS in North Korea, but all contact was lost.
- Operation Mustang VIII- This was another mission to destroy the railroads, but there were no communications after the initial drop of the six-man team.
- Operation Pappy
- Operation Quicksilver
- Operation Rabbit I
- Operation Rabbit II
- Operation Red Frog
- Operation Shining Moon
- Operation Spitfire
- Operation Stole
- Operation Storm Trooper
- Operation Tropic
- Operation Trudy Jackson
