= Jeju 4.3 Peace Park =

Park and museum in South Korea

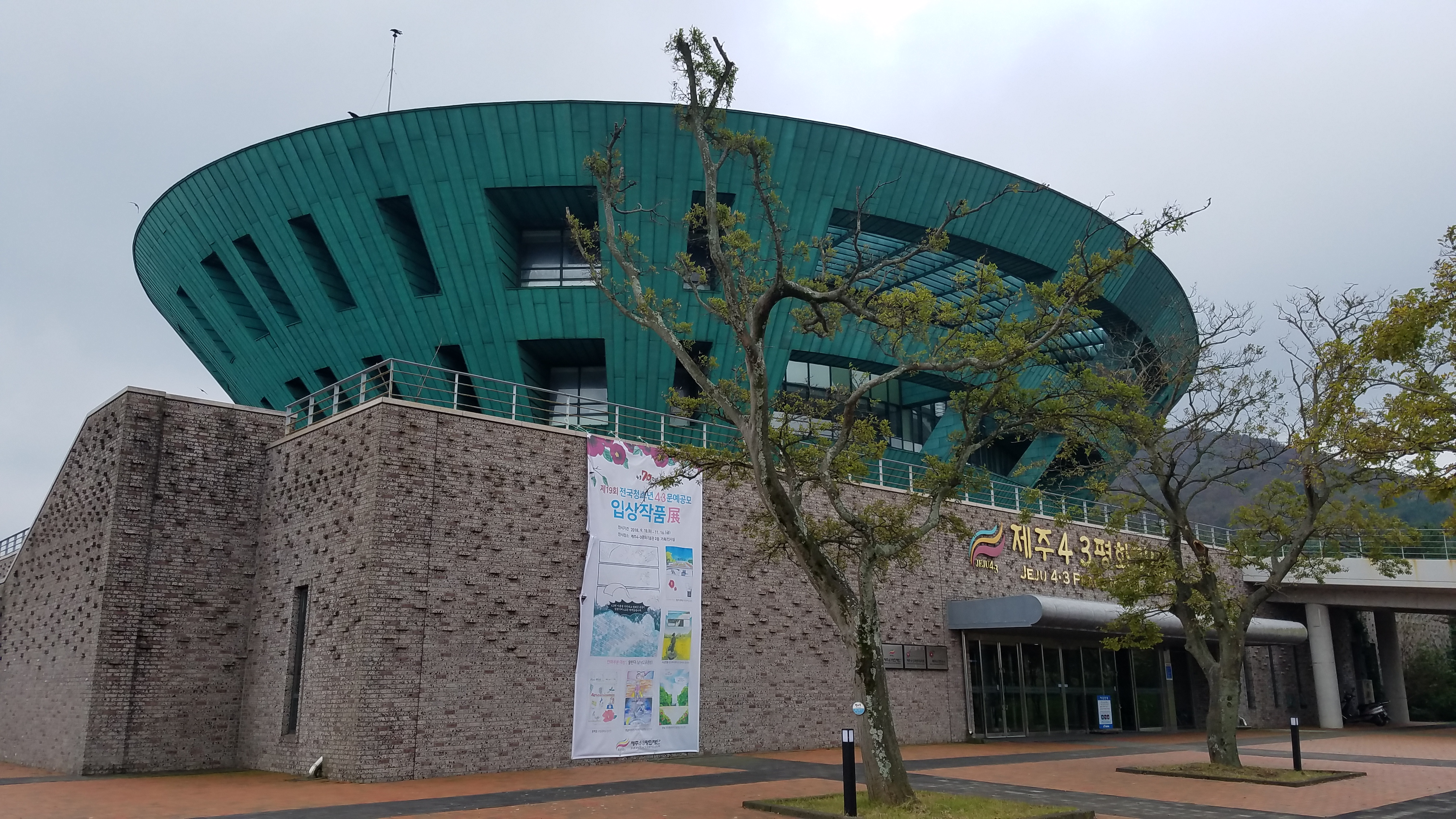
- Interactive map of Jeju 4.3 Peace Park
- Location: Bonggae-dong, Jeju City, Jeju Province, South Korea
- Coordinates: 33°27′05″N 126°37′08″E
- Area: 35.938 ha (88.80 acres)
- Website: jejupark43.1941.co.kr

Jeju 4.3 Peace Park (Korean: 제주4·3평화공원) is a memorial park and museum in Bonggae-dong, Jeju City, Jeju Province, South Korea. It commemorates the victims of the 1948–1949 Jeju uprising.

== Description ==
In June 1999, President Kim Dae-jung pledged to support the construction of a memorial park to the Jeju uprising. After a January 2000 act issued by the Jeju 4.3 Committee, efforts began to construct the park. Designs were finalized in June 2001, and the land purchase was completed in 2002. A groundbreaking ceremony began on April 3, 2003. Infrastructure was completed in November 2005. The Peace Park opened on March 28, 2008.

The park consists of a park and a museum to the uprising. Each year on April 3, there is a memorial service held in honor of the dead.

== Gallery ==
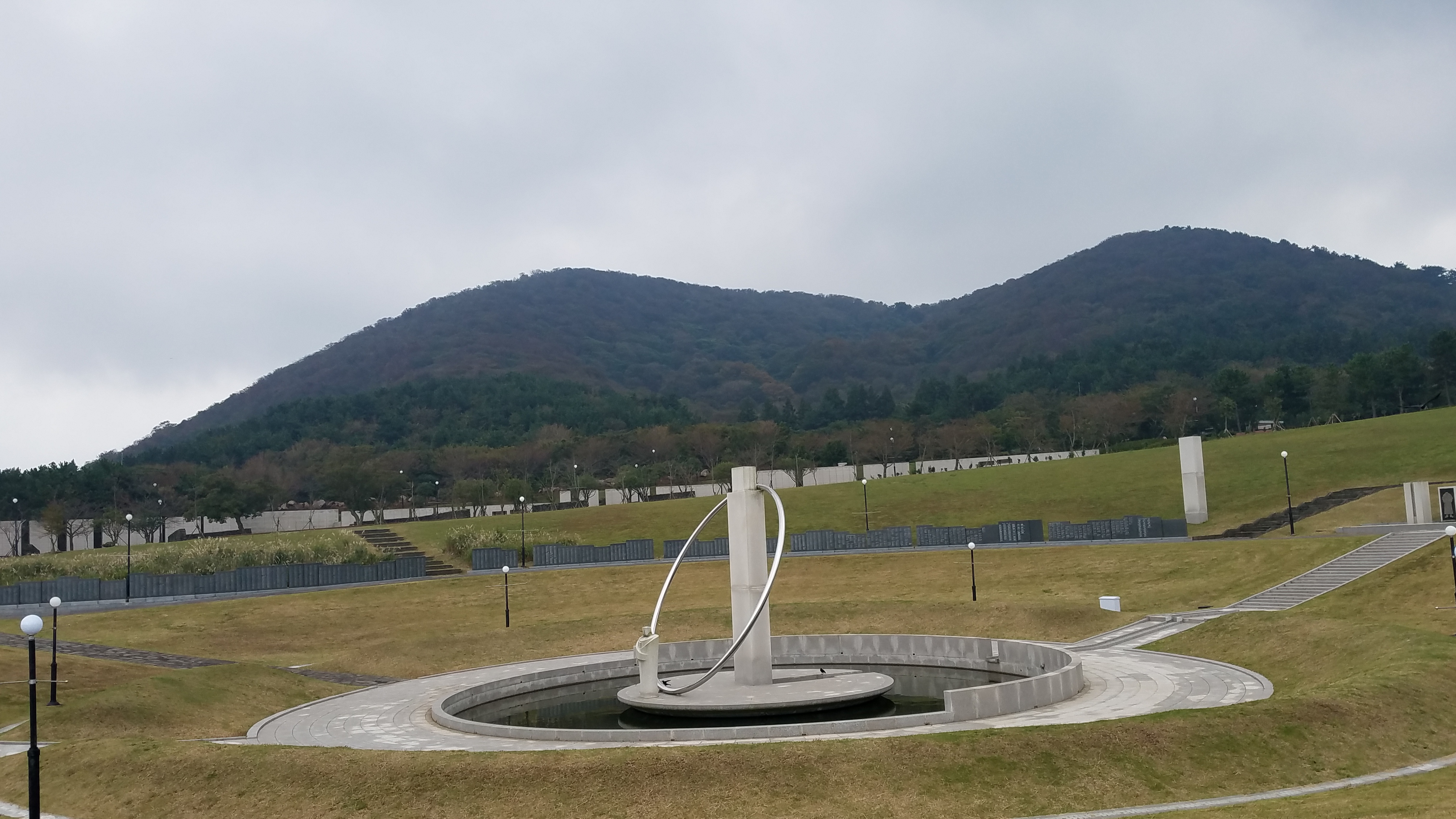
Memorial Monument

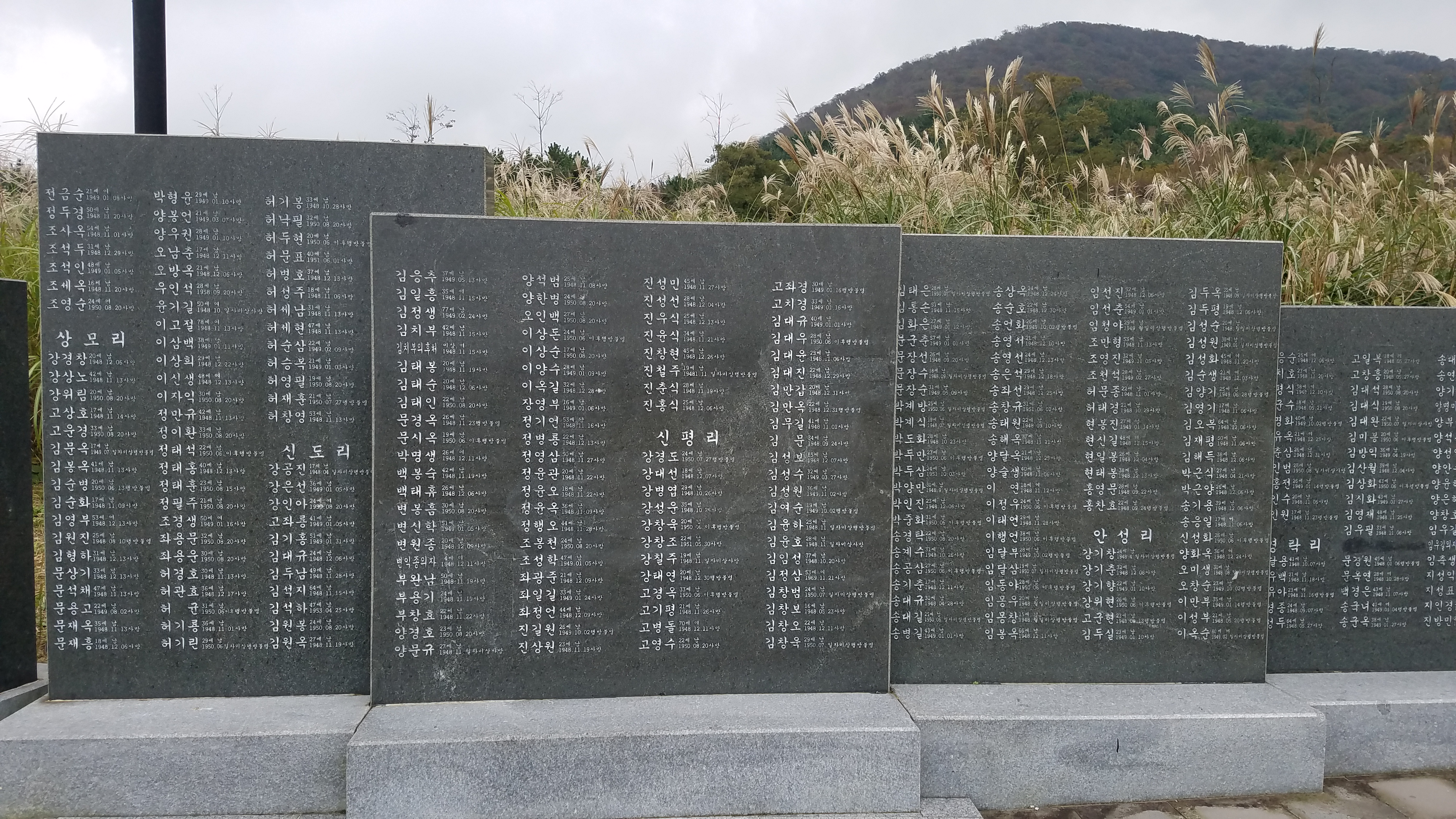
Names of deceased on tablets

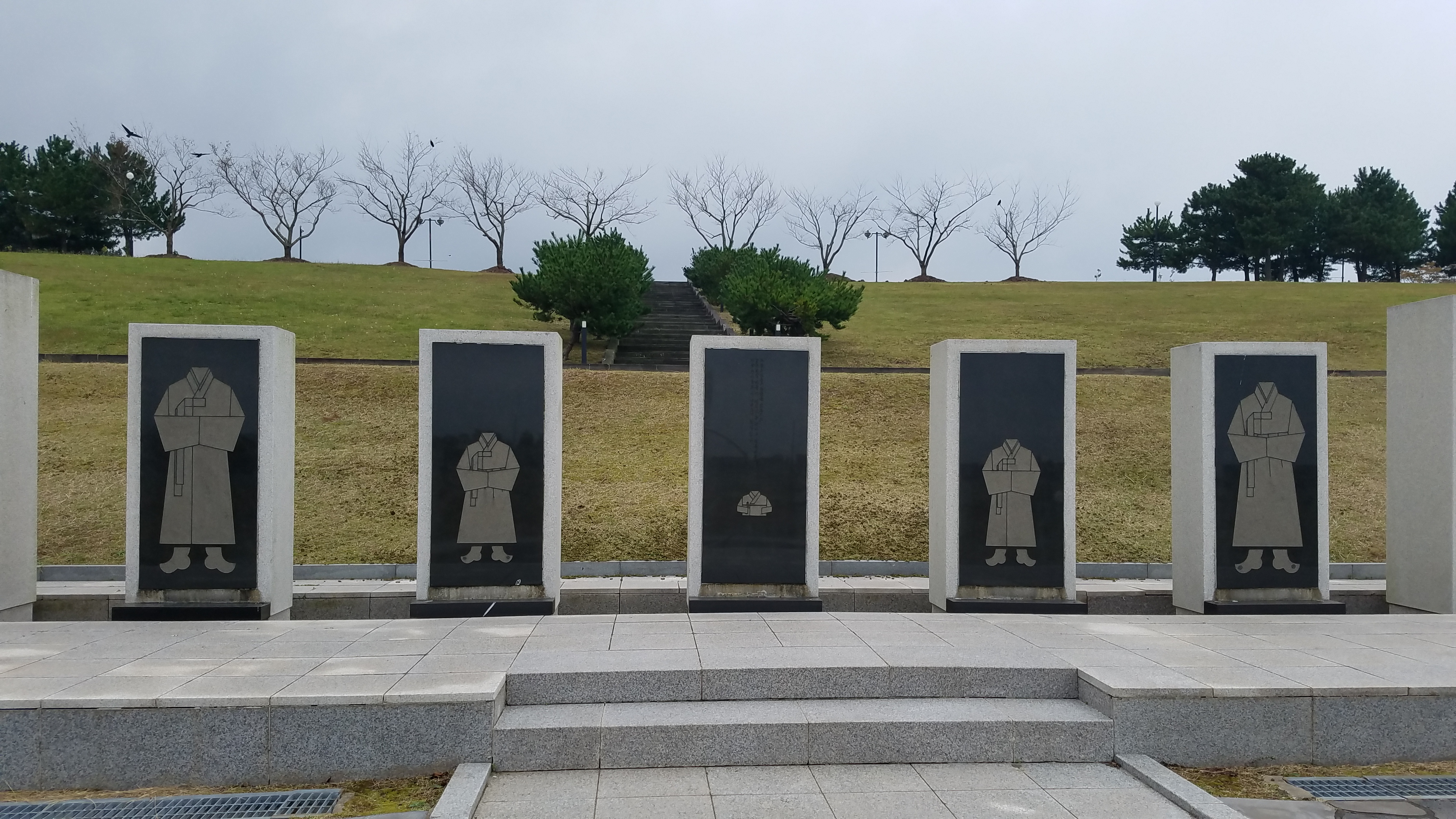
Memorial statue depicting four adults and a child
