= Kim Sok-pom =

Zainichi Korean novelist (born 1925)

- Hangul: 김석범
- Hanja: 金石範
- RR: Gim Seokbeom
- MR: Kim Sŏkpŏm
- Also referred to in Japanese as: きん せきはん (Kin Sekihan) キム ソクポム (Kimu Sokupomu)

Kim Sok-pom, also spelled Kim Suok-puom (born October 2, 1925) is a Zainichi Korean novelist who writes in Japanese.

== Biography ==
Born in Osaka to parents of Jeju origin, Kim accompanied his family to Jeju, a Korean island, where he became acquainted with supporters of the Korean independence movement. In 1945, when he had returned to Osaka, the war ended. Directly after that, he went to Seoul, but came back to Japan again after that, where he would stay. He attended Kansai University, and graduated from the Department of Literature at Kyoto University, having specialized in literature. Soon after his graduation, the April 3 massacre broke out in his ancestral hometown of Jeju, an incident which became a motif of his later work.

In 1957, Karasu no shi and Kanshu Baku Shobō appeared in Bungei Shuto magazine. Around this time, Kim was involved in organising Chongryon, the pro-North Korean ethnic association in Japan, but after Karasu no shi was published as a stand-alone book with three other short stories of his, he left the organisation. With the change to be published further, Kim focused on writing in Japanese, in 1970 writing Mandoku yūrei kitan, which confirmed his position as a novelist. The same work would be published in serial form between 1976 and 1981 in Bungakukai literary magazine under the title Tsunami; afterwards, the name was changed to Kazantō.

Kim has not obtained South Korean citizenship following the division of Korea after the Korean War. In 1988, at the invitation of a civic group, Kim travelled to Seoul and Jeju Island, despite having no citizenship. When fellow Zainichi Korean novelist Lee Hoesung took South Korean citizenship in 1998, Kim criticised him, and a debate between the two developed in the media. Kazantō, his book about the 1945 Jeju Massacre has been controversial in South Korea, and he was denied entry to South Korea twice: in 1980 and in 2015.

== Themes ==
Major themes in Kim's works include imperialism, notions of home, survival and popular nationalism; he touches upon controversial topics such as identity politics and state genocide. His work are seen as an allegory on what it means to be a Zainichi Korean in postwar Japan.

== Major works ==
(English titles not official)

Year	Title	Notes
1957	Kanshu Baku Shobō 看守朴書房	Pak Seo-bong the Gaoler
1957	Karasu no Shi 鴉の死	The Death of the Crow
1970	Mandoku yūrei kitan 万徳幽霊奇譚	Translated into English as The Curious Tale of Mandogi's Ghost, Columbia University Press, 2010, 9780231153119
1971	Kotoba no jubaku - Zainichi Chōsenjin Bungakuto Nihongo ことばの呪縛―「在日朝鮮人文学」と日本語	The Curse of Words - Zainichi Korean Literature and the Japanese Language
1973	Yoru 夜	Night
1967-1997	Kazantō 火山島	Volcano Island
2001	Naze kakitsuzukete kitanoka, naze chinmoku shite kitanoka - Chejutō 4-3 jikenno kiokuto bungaku なぜ書きつづけてきたか・なぜ沈黙してきたか―済州島四・三事件の記憶と文学	Why did we keep writing, why did we stay silent? Memories and literature of the Jeju massacre; co-authored with Gim Shi-jong (金時鐘)
2001	Suni Obasan 順伊（スニ）おばさん	Aunt Suni; co-authored with Geon Gi-yeong (玄基榮)
2004	Kokkyūwo koerumono Zainichino bungakuto seiji 国境を越えるもの「在日」の文学と政治	Crossing Borders: The Literature and Politics of Zainichi Koreans
