= Jimmie Leach =

James Herbert (Jimmie) Leach
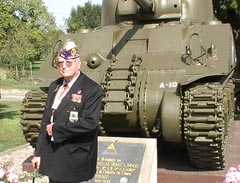
- Leach at Arracourt, France in 2009
- Born: April 7, 1922; Houston, Texas
- Died: December 17, 2009 (aged 87); Beaufort, South Carolina
- Burial place: Beaufort National Cemetery
- Military career
- Allegiance: United States of America
- Branch: United States Army
- Service years: 1938–1974
- Rank: Colonel
- Commands: WWII: Company B, 37th Tank Battalion, 4th Armored Division; Vietnam: 11th Armored Cavalry
- Conflicts: World War II; Jeju uprising Korean War; Vietnam War
- Awards: DSC; Silver Star (3); Legion of Merit (2); Bronze Star (2) with "V"; Purple Heart (5)

James Herbert Leach (April 7, 1922 – December 17, 2009) was a United States Army colonel who served as a tank company commander in World War II and an armored regiment commander in the Vietnam War. He was awarded the Distinguished Service Cross in World War II and three Silver Stars in Vietnam.

== Career ==
During World War II, in July 1944 and 1945, Leach (then a captain) served in combat under Lieutenant Colonel Creighton Abrams (Abrams tank) who commanded the 37th Tank Battalion of the 4th Armored Division, which beginning on August 1, 1944, joined and spearheaded for General George Patton and his Third Army. On June 28, after landing in Normandy on June 11 after D-Day (June 6) at Utah Beach, the 4th AD participated in Operation Cobra, which began the offensive out of Normandy and subsequent rapid advance across France, through the Lorraine Campaign and the Battle of the Bulge.

From May to September 1948, Leach served as U.S. Army liaison to the government of South Korea on Jeju island at the beginning of the insurrection that has been termed the Jeju uprising. Col. Leach later commanded the 11th Armored Cavalry as the 40th "Colonel of the Regiment" in South Vietnam from April–December 1969, having taken command from Col. George Patton IV, son of his Third Army World War commander. As Chief of Armor Branch of the US Army in 1970–1972 he oversaw the careers of 3500 field-grade Army officers. As Chief, Col. Leach paid particular attention to the desire of battle-wounded officers to remain active in the Army. General Frederick M. Franks, Jr. credits Col. Leach with the critical role in maintaining his Army career and the career of other officers after Franks lost a foot in combat in Vietnam. Franks later led elements of Operation Desert Storm in the first Gulf War.

Col. Leach received the Distinguished Service Cross for his heroism at Bigonville, Luxembourg on December 24, 1944, during the Battle of the Bulge, and earned five Purple Hearts for wounds in the European campaigns. He also was awarded the Croix de Guerre of Luxembourg, Virtuti Militarie – Poland, two Legion of Merits, three Silver Stars during Vietnam, and two Bronze Star Medals for heroism. Other honors include: Officer Candidate School Hall of Fame, Ft. Benning, GA; First recipient of the Gold Medal of the Order of St. George, US Armor Association in 1986; Professor of Military History, Ft. Knox, Kentucky; President of Military Officers of America Association; and President of the Veterans Cemetery Committee of Beaufort (VCCOB).

He was the posthumous recipient of the French Legion of Honor, in 2010.

After retirement from the U.S. Army in 1974, Col. Leach worked for defense contractor Teledyne for 14 years before retiring to Beaufort, SC. Col. Leach led successful efforts to expand the National Cemetery in Beaufort, South Carolina. a resting place for war dead since the Civil War. He last visited France in September 2009, celebrating the 65th anniversary of the American liberation of the Province of Lorraine. At Chancenay, the memorial for the Battle of Arracourt and three other celebrations, Col. Leach offered remarks honoring the French and the soldiers who participated in his battles. In 1983, COL LEACH became the Honorary Colonel of the 37th Armor Regiment. For more than two decades, he visited active battalions of the 37th ARMOR to ensure that the current battalion leadership learned about the history of this unit. It was his example that inspired the creation of the 37th Armor Alumni Association that today numbers 5,000 members. www.courageconquers.com

Lt. Colonel Abrams, who became U.S. commander in Vietnam and Chairman of the Joint Chiefs of Staff, described young Capt. Leach at 22: "The placid, modest, friendly exterior of this Officer disguises the fighting heart of a lion and the tenaciousness of a bulldog, all seasoned with an engaging personality. – Lt. Colonel Creighton W. Abrams, Dec. 31, 1944."
