= Horim Unit =

Former South Korean military unit

- 호림부대
- Active: 25 February 1949 – Unknown (likely disbanded after 1950)
- Country: South Korea
- Branch: Republic of Korea Army
- Type: Special operations, guerrilla warfare
- Size: ~240 personnel
- Part of: Army Headquarters Intelligence Bureau
- Engagements: Infiltration missions into North Korea

Commanders
- Notable commanders: Major Han Wang-yong (한왕용)

The Horim Unit (Korean: 호림부대; Hanja: 虎林部隊) was a clandestine guerrilla and reconnaissance unit of the Republic of Korea Army created in 1949 under the Army Headquarters Intelligence Bureau. It was tasked with infiltration into North Korea during the early Cold War period, before the outbreak of the Korean War.

== History ==
The unit was established on 25 February 1949, composed largely of anti-communist North Korean refugees and members of the North-West Youth Association. Its first commander was Major Han Wang-yong.

After training at the Army Reconnaissance School, the unit was split into two battalions (5th and 6th), stationed near Seoraksan for infiltration missions into North Korea.

In August 1949, approximately 316 operatives infiltrated North Korea via Gangwon Province. Of the around 240 involved in deep-penetration operations, at least 203 were reportedly killed and 14 captured. There are also attestations of the unit that was covered in a North Korean internal party report about their operations in Inje County (then part of North Korea) on July 4th, 1949. Captured operatives were put on public trial in Pyongyang. Thousands were reportedly gathered at the Moranbong Theatre to witness the proceedings, which were recorded by North Korean media.

In the 2000s, South Korea’s Truth and Reconciliation Commission investigated the Horim Unit for involvement in massacres of suspected communist civilians during training or anti-partisan operations. Responsibility was linked to then-Intelligence Bureau chief General Paik Sun-yup.

== Legacy ==
In 2024, veterans and nationalist groups formed the Horim Security Council (호림안보협의회), aiming to honor the legacy of the unit.

The unit and its public trials were featured in investigative news segments by MBC in 2000 and 2006, after footage of the Pyongyang trials was discovered.

== See also ==
- Unit 684
- Republic of Korea Army Special Warfare Command
- Truth and Reconciliation Commission (South Korea)
- North-West Youth Association
- Korean War
