= Jeju 4.3 Committee =

Truth commission in South Korea

The National Committee for Investigation of the Truth about the Jeju 4.3 Events (Korean: 제주4·3사건진상규명및희생자명예회복위원회, 4.3 Committee) was a truth commission in South Korea established in 2000. The commission aimed to investigate the Jeju 4.3 events, which refers to a "series of armed uprisings and counterinsurgency that occurred between 1948 and 1954 on Jeju Island, the largest island in the southernmost part of South Korea." Announcing 14,028 victims, the first report of the commission was published in 2003, following an official apology by President Roh Moo-hyun, and his participation in a memorial service held in commemoration of the events, in 2006. However the commission continued to be in operation through 2009, carrying out various reparation projects as well as the screening of victims, thus making it the lengthiest truth commission in history.

== Background ==
=== Events ===
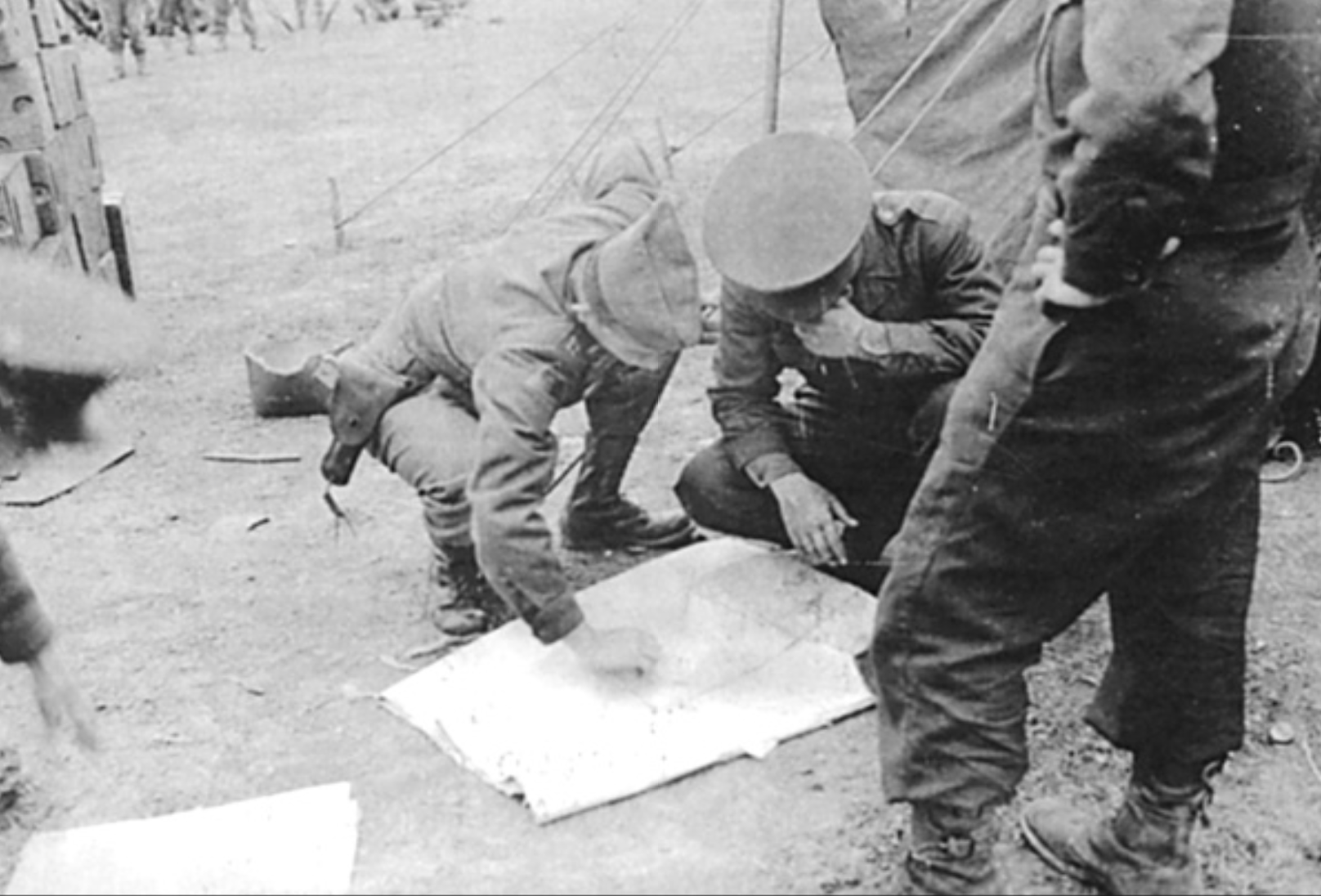
US Military Advisor Captain Lerch and a military officer discuss Anti-Guerrilla Operations (May 15, 1948)

Within the context of the early Cold War era, the events under investigation occurred on April 3, 1948, when the leadership of the South Korean Communist Party Jeju Committee led an armed uprising against the South Korean Interim Government (SKIG). As such, over 350 Leftist Guerrillas attacked various police stations on Jeju Island, in addition to killing many prominent right-wing political figures. In an effort to stabilize the situation, the South Korean government sent over 100 reinforcement forces. However, upon realization that the number of police officers sent was insufficient to control the guerrillas, "The government then mobilized the members of anti-communist paramilitary groups who were deeply involved in Korean politics, using violence in favour of the right-wing leaders and the US military government." Failing to control the guerrilla armed resistance, enforcement responsibilities were transferred to the South Korean military. Resulting from this, civilians not involved in the conflict were abused and murdered by perpetrators including: armed guerrillas, police, military and Paramilitary groups.

=== Debates over events ===
Since the South Korean transition to a democratic government in 1987, studies debating the causes and consequences of the Jeju 4.3 events have emerged which challenge the official narratives of the event. Specifically, three major debates challenging the official narratives include the characteristics of the armed uprising, the start-date of the incident, and circumstances surrounding responsibility of civilian massacres.

Before South Korean democratization in 1987, the characteristics of the armed uprising on 3 April 1948, were mostly referred to and understood as communist rebellions in all public records, including mass media, textbooks, and government documents. As proposed by Kim, "by defining the key event as a communist rebellion, civilian massacres and human rights abuses were easily justified as collateral to, and a necessary part of, the efforts to prevent communization." Alternative perspectives to explain the armed uprising in Jeju include 'Democratic movement', or 'Popular uprising'. This proposed perspective dismantled the Communism rebellion argument led by the SKIG, by explaining that, "The armed uprising was both widely supported by the general public and an inevitable response to the oppression and misrule of the US military government and the incompetence of the Korean government."

Further, the start date of the Jeju 4.3 Incident has been debated. Prior to 1987, the view was that the Incident started on 3 April 1948, when the guerrilla communists led an armed uprising. However, upon democratization in 1987, a revisionist view emerged, arguing that events began on 1 March 1947, when dissatisfaction with the US military government resulted in a demonstration and the local police, under the control of the US military, opened fire, severely injuring no less than ten individuals. Consequently, the Revisionist perspective would argue, "the armed uprising on 3 April 1948 was one of several instances of public resistance to the US military government, which originally commenced on 1 March 1947."

The third debate over the events of the Jeju 4.3 Incident challenged the official narrative of the responsibility for civilian massacres. The traditional narrative is that the communist guerrillas were mainly responsible for the massacres and human rights violations. Contrasting this argument and relating to the challenges made in the second debate, "since the armed protest was actually a response to oppression and misrule, it is the US military government and nascent Korean government that are in fact responsible for the massacres and abuses."

== Stages of Advocacy for Transitional Justice ==
=== Stage 1 (1954–1987) ===
Following the Jeju 4.3 events, the truth of their occurrence remained suppressed for over 25 years under dictatorial regimes. The first breakthrough was in 1978, when a South Korean writer named Hyun Ki-young, published his novel titled Aunt Suni. The novel described a fictional character who returns to Jeju island for his grandfather's memorial service. Upon his arrival, the main character learns of the atrocities perpetrated by the South Korean military and the police during the 4.3 events. Hyun Ki-Young's novel significantly impacted social activists giving rise to underground student movements. As described by Kim, “the time between 1978 and 1987 became a period of preparation.” During this time scholars and underground activists secretly attempted to rediscover the truth through repressed accounts and memories of the 4.3 events and massacres, holding memorial services and frequent discussion of the events.

=== Stage 2 (1987–1992) ===
Upon democratization in South Korea, public and mass movements devised to uncover the truth about the Jeju 4.3 events emerged at the local level. At this time there were three advocacy activities including: media coverage, memorial services, and research. In terms of media coverage, local newspapers such as the Jemin-Ilbo played a significant role in uncovering evidence of massacres and taking testimonies which would be shared publicly. Further, social movement groups organized the first memorial service for the Jeju 4.3 events in 1989. The memorial services were followed by a month-long festival that featured traditional plays, testimony hearings, films, concerts, and art as public communication tools concerning the Jeju events. As described by Kim, “it provided an arena where activists could discuss the 4.3 events and share information, expertise and strategies.” Research also contributed to advocacy efforts through the establishment of the 4.3 Research Institute. The objective of this organization was to find evidence of the massacres and disperse information. Resulting from this was an excavation of the Darangshi cave on Jeju island in 1992. Here, the researchers discovered skeletal remains of corpses, proving to be a significant advancement in the transitional justice process.

=== Stage 3 (1993–1997) ===
During this time, the Kim Young-sam administration decentralized state power by instituting local government and elected council systems. Within this political context, the Provincial 4.3 Committee was created under the Jeju Provincial Council. The Provincial Committee's action plan was to investigate the truth behind the 4.3 events. In doing, so they created the Office for 4.3 Victim Registration. Consequently, 17 investigators were tasked with conducting interviews and gathering evidence. After a year long investigation, the Provincial Committee published a final report in 1995 listing 14,504 victims of the Jeju events.

=== Stage 4 (1998–2000) ===
By 1998, activists, victims, and politicians involved in the uncovering of the truth of the 4.3 events directed their energy into two organizations that would then combine the efforts of all the individuals involved. These included The Pan National Committee for the Jeju 4.3 Events, created in Seoul, and the Provincial Solidarity for the Jeju 4.3, created in Jeju. However, after a year of disappointing results, by 1999 activists began to look at advocating for the enactment of a binding special law that would legally guarantee the establishment of a truth commission for the Jeju Incident.

Consequently, the local council members of Jeju along with 90 activists and victims were the thrust behind a national campaign, making several appearances before the National Assembly in South Korea, as well as organizing weekly rallies. However, despite these activities, there were no tangible advancements due to the hesitation of leaders. In response, a Congresswoman from the ruling party, Choo Mi-ae, according to Kim, “played a significant role in bringing the 4.3 events into the forefront of national politics and urging the ruling party to fulfill its commitment.” Evidently, Choo released an official document containing a 200-page list of 1,650 persons who were court-martialed during the Jeju 4.3 events. The document showed detailed information of the military trials that took place; showing that detainees were executed within a month after initial trials, and some were executed after one day. Consequently, Kim describes that, “It provided undeniable evidence of the execution without due process of a large number of people in a short period of time, and made it possible for the concerned lawmakers to proceed without much resistance”

== Establishment of the Committee ==
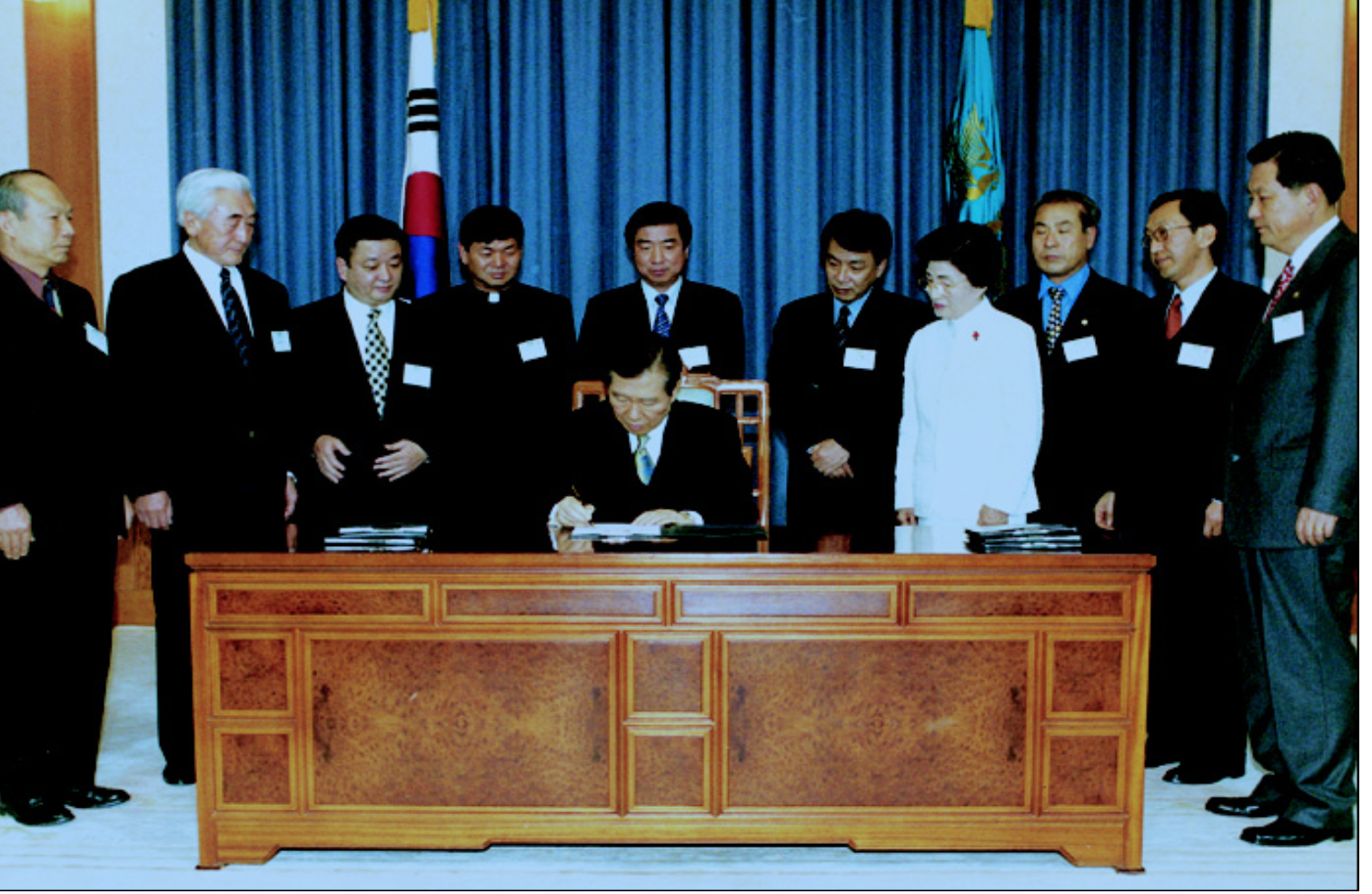
President Kim Dae-jung signs the Jeju 4.3 Special Law (January 11th, 2000)

Following the release of the official document by Choo Mi-ae, three congressmen from the opposition Grand National Party from Jeju island proposed a draft of a bill that included the establishment of an independent committee regarding the Jeju 4.3 events, under the Office of the Prime Minister. The bill marked the first redefinition of the events as something other than a communist rebellion. The bill would define the 4.3 events as a "disturbance" that occurred from 3 April 1948 in Jeju Island. Further, it would refuse any transitional justice measures beyond the investigation. This definition in particular was criticized by activists and victims who demanded a term that went beyond a disturbance, but rather acknowledging the 4.3 events as mass human rights violations perpetrated by the state. As such, within a month, activists and victims proposed their own version of the bill defining it as, “Events which occurred in Jeju Island from 1 March 1947 to 27 July 1953 when civilians were abused without good cause during the armed conflicts and governmental suppression by the police, military and paramilitary groups of the US military government and Korea government.”.

Consequently, two differing bills were put through the negotiation process; activists and victims pushed for definitions, while the Grand National Party pushed for no reparations. For the activists and victims, the reparations were a secondary issue relative to defining the 4.3 events, because the redefinition would serve their primary focus which was to honour the victims and their families. Thus as Kim puts it, “For activists and victims, the compromise was a strategic and provisional concession in order to enact a special law.” A compromise was reached through a bipartisan bill, that consisted of the redefinition of the 4.3 events in accordance with the activists and victims, and an article on a financial and medical subsidy without reparation for the victims. The only additional transitional measures that could be guaranteed under the law beyond the establishment of the truth commission were commemoration projects (a memorial park, museum, and cemetery). The bill was passed on 16 December 1999, preceding the 4.3 Special Act, and nine months later, the 4.3 Committee.

=== Organization of the committee ===
According to the Jeju 4.3 Special Law, "The highest decision-making body is the Special or National Committee for Investigation of the Jeju 4.3 Incident and Restoring the Honor of the Victims." According to Enforcement Regulation No.3 of the Special Law, the committee must be composed of no less than twenty members. These mandatory members included the prime minister, who is also the chairperson of the committee, the ministers of justice, of government registration, of budget and planning, the Governor of Jeju Province, representatives of the victims' families who are designated by the prime minister, and relevant experts and people of learning and experience. Consequently, upon the establishment of the committee on August 8, 2000, the members of the committee included: the prime minister, seven additional government ministers, twelve civilians including representatives of the victim's families, as well as lawyers, heads of civic groups, scholars, and former army generals.

Additionally, Article No. 7 of the Special Law indicated that, "the task force for preparing the report can be organized separately in order to maintain objectivity and heighten efficiency." As such, this task force according to the Enforcement Ordinance No. 12 of the Special Law must be composed of less than fifteen members. These members must include director-general level officials who are appointed by the prime minister, the vice-governor of Jeju, various representatives of the victims' families and relevant experts.

Consequently, upon the establishment of the committee on January 17, 2000, the leader of the task force was lawyer Park Won-sun, with membership by five director-general level officials from various government offices including the vice-governor of Jeju, and ten civilians including representatives of the victims' families, scholars, lawyers and heads of civic groups. Further, within the task force, an investigation team was organized with five expert advisors and fifteen investigators, led by the team Chief Advisor Yang Jo-hun.

=== Operation of the committee ===
The investigation primarily focused on the "armed conflict, the suppression of it and the killing of innocent people during the process for seven years and seven months post the shooting incident by the police on March 1, 1947 to the lifting of the standstill order on Mt. Halla on September 21, 1954." Further, the committee's policy outlined the task of investigating the background of the incident, including its development and the extent of damage incurred, while investigating the killing of innocent bystanders and human rights abuses more generally.

The duration of the investigation was two and a half years, from September 2000 until February 2003. The steps of the investigation included "making lists of the data and witnesses who are scheduled to give their testimony and selecting institutes and organizations from which the data will be collected, collecting the data and recording the testimonies, analyzing the data and the testimony, and making and examining the report."

The task force, which held the responsibility of developing and publishing the report, conducted 12 meetings and reviewed everything from the basic plans of the investigation to the content of the report. Further, the full-time investigation team collected data from organizations and institutes both domestically and abroad and recorded the testimony from witnesses on Jeju Island, in Seoul, Japan and the United States.

== Investigation activities ==
=== Emphasis ===
The investigation team's objective was to place emphasis on discovering and revealing the truth with respect to the following issues:

1. The 50-years history of investigation of the Jeju 4.3 Incident
2. The definition of the incident
3. The background and the cause of the incident
4. The range of engagement and the roles of the South Korean Labor Party
5. The organization and activities of the armed guerillas
6. The range of intervention and role of the Seobuk Young Men's Association
7. The number of deaths
8. The statistical analysis of the assailants
9. The damage done by the armed guerrillas
10. The damage done by the punitive forces

=== Methods ===
The investigation committee searched for data from 19 domestic institutes and administrative bodies and nine foreign countries, collecting 10,594 cases. The committee used bibliographic surveys from domestic institutes as well as foreign countries, and recorded testimony to collect data.

==== Bibliographic surveys ====
===== Domestic data =====
In terms of domestic data, the bibliographic survey used 1,500 published and unpublished source materials pertaining to the Jeju 4.3 Incident. The committee proceeded to target organizations and institutions related to the Incident. Once these were chosen, the task force team gave weight to securing the data from government bodies such as the records of the police and military operations, which were directly involved in the suppression of the incident, minutes of Cabinet meetings, and trial rulings.

Additionally, the committee attempted to discover and secure data from current magazines and newspapers, the stenographic records of the National Assembly, the laws, regulations and administrative orders of the US Army Military Government in Korea, personnel orders, individual memoirs and the records from the armed guerrillas. According to the Investigation report of the Jeju 4.3 Incident, "It is believed that the team made a successful attempt to collect and analyze the data. Yet the data from the military, the police, and the armed guerrillas were relatively insufficient. The team encountered difficulty due to the data discarded by the police."

===== International data =====
In securing data, the investigation team sent its staff to three countries including the United States, Russia, and Japan, conducting surveys in each with the aid of resident experts. Among the three countries mentioned, emphasis was placed on the United States, with an in-depth data search conducted, given that the Incident occurred whilst the United States Military Government was heavily involved. According to the investigation report, the first research was conducted from March 29 to April 27, 2001, and the second was carried out for six months from June 23 to December 1 of the same year. To search for the data, the survey team visited the National Archives and Records Administration (hereafter referred to as NARA), the MacArthur Memorial and the U.S. Army Military History Institute. "The NARA was so cooperative with the survey that it even provided the team with an exclusive work table. The survey team collected about 800 pieces of materials related directly or indirectly to the incident. The quantity of materials was enormous, reaching more than 10,000 pages of copies." In the midst of the international investigation, the team referred to truth commission cases in foreign countries for guidance. Consequently, the investigation team successfully obtained research from truth commissions in Argentina, Taiwan, South Africa, and Spain.

==== Recorded testimony ====
Over a period of 16 months from July 2001 to October 2002, 503 witness testimonies were recorded using voice recorders and camcorders. The recordings were conducted in Jeju, Seoul, as well as in countries including Japan and the United States. Witnesses were chosen from "the damage and casualty report of the Jeju Provincial Council, newspapers, broadcast programs and collections of testimony." Further, the committee received recommended witnesses from various organizations; the committee also launched its own witness selection from ex-armed guerrillas and commanders of the suppression operations. Through this process, a list of 2,780 people was completed, out of which 500 people were screened into a final selection. Priority was given to witnesses with unusual backgrounds, those who underwent unique or specific incidents or came from a village that incurred severe damage, and those who were discovered by the committee's own investigation.

== Findings ==
=== Human rights abuses ===
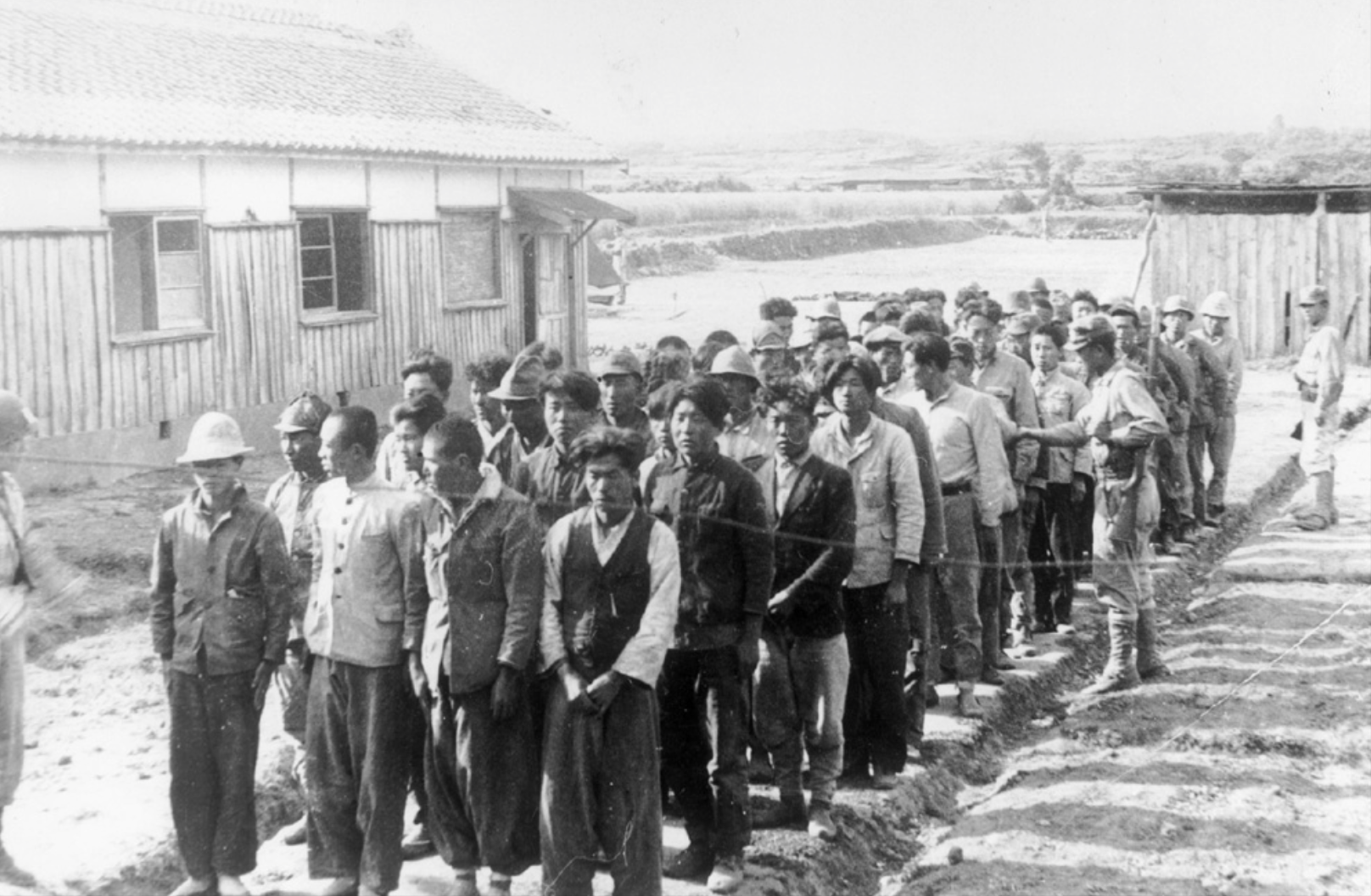
Inmates waiting inline to be interrogated (November, 1948)

The events that took place in the Jeju 4.3 Incident in the region of Mount Halla resulted in mass human rights violations. The South Korean government's counter-insurgency strategies led to guerrilla warfare until 1954. According to Kim, "The counterinsurgency strategy was extremely brutal; it included mass arrest and detention, forced relocation, torture, indiscriminate killing and the large-scale massacre of civilians." Hundreds of villages were razed when residents were suspected of providing shelter and food to the leftist guerrillas, and many more villages in the Mount Halla region were systematically burned with residents forcibly relocated to the coast. More serious human rights abuses including mass killings and disappearances were evident in the earlier stages of the Incident, specifically between May 1948 and March 1949. According to the 2003 report of the 4.3 Committee, "15,100 victims have been identified, among which 10,729 (71%) were deceased, 3,920 (26%) missing, 207 (1.4%) injured and 244 (1.6%) imprisoned."

Furthermore, the report also confirmed 448 victims of systematic civilian massacres, evidence of illegal detention, indiscriminate sweeping arrests, and summary executions. Consequently, "Many civilians were arrested and sentenced to death or to life imprisonment in makeshift martial courts. Torture was widely used to extract false confessions, which in turn were used to justify summary execution and illegal detentions." Finally, the report identified the suffering consequent to the guilt-by-association-system. This system entailed that, "Not only the direct family members of the convicted but also more distant relatives were inflicted with punishment or disadvantages." The report highlighted cases in which some family members of the 4.3 Incident were subject to unfair treatment regarding employability, promotion, and travel opportunities.

== Recommendations to the Government ==
Recommendations by the National Committee for Investigation of the Truth About the Jeju 4.3 Events (4.3 Committee) to the government of South Korea include:

- To issue an apology to Jeju islanders, the victims and their families.
- To provide essential living expenses to bereaved families suffering from poverty.
- To utilize the final report as educational material.
- To declare the date of April 3 as a memorial day.
- To support excavations of mass graves and historical sites.
- To actively support the establishment of a Jeju April 3 Peace Memorial Park.
- To support further investigations and memorial affairs.

=== Implementation of recommendations ===
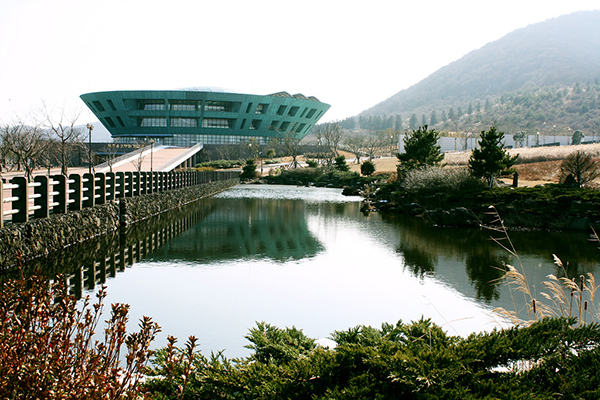
Jeju 4.3 Peace Park

Immediately following the release of the Jeju 4.3 Investigation report in 2003, the President of South Korea, Roh Moo-hyun, provided an apology to the victims of the incident and their families. This was significant in South Korean history because it marked the first apology by a head of state for human rights abuses perpetrated by the state.

Further, South Korean history textbooks have changed the characterization of the events, providing a more neutral understanding of human rights violations. Additionally, victims and their families were compensated for the economic hardships suffered, as well as physical and mental illnesses that resulted from the incident. In direct accordance with the recommendations by the Jeju 4.3 committee, the Commission involved itself in three commemoration projects, and by 2007 the Jeju Foundation (a memorial park and museum) was created. The objectives of the Jeju Foundation were to, “promote peace and human rights by, first, maintaining the museum and memorial park, and second, by conducting additional investigations.”

Further in 2006, the Commission launched a long-term excavation project to find the remains of the victims and discover mass graves. Consequently, by 2013, eight out of 151 mass murder sites, and the remains of over 400 victims had been discovered.

== Controversies of the investigation ==
Criticisms of the commission include:

- Despite no direct evidence found that the Central South Korean Labor Party was involved in the 4.3 Incident, it is however very clear that armed leftist guerrillas under the leadership of the SKLP murdered police and military officers, including their families, election managers, and civilians.
- Issues remain with the calculations of victims of the 4.3 events. As such, as described by the Jeju 4.3 Committee, precise calculation of victims is extremely difficult. Consequently, the number of victims reported may not include the total victims. As explained by the Committee, “There are still many undeclared and unidentified victims.”
- Resulting from the 4.3 Incident, victims of the right-wing organizations such as the Seobuk Young Men's Association, Minbodan thru and Daecheong were given ‘National Veteran” status, along with national support and privileges.
- It is believed that several members of the Seobuk Young Men's Association arrived in Jeju prior to the Incident, and engaged in several conflicts with civilians, which are the origins of the 4.3 Incident. During this time, the members engaged in suppression, including torture and murder. Further, several testimonies and documents reveal that President Rhee Syng-man and the United States Army ordered the Seobuk Men's Association to dispatch to Jeju island.
- There are issues surrounding the Martial Law implemented on November 17, 1948, such that it may have been illegal given it was enforced without any legal grounds. The conclusion of the report does not confirm this issue directly, but points out that the Martial Law certainly surpassed its parameters.
- A major position is that the United States Military Government and the Provisional Military Advisory Group (PNAG) should not be free from responsibility of the suppression and occurrences of the 4.3 Incident. Evidence has shown that the US Army Colonel in Jeju directly commanded the Suppression Operation; in addition to this, the US Army supplying weapons and observation aircraft for the Suppression Operation. The US also “praised the 9th Regiment’s Operation, burning down the Mountainous villages as a successful operation, and one record reveals Commodore William L. Roberts, director of the US Military Advisors requested to the Korean Government to announce publicly of Regiment Chief, Song Yo-chan’s active involvements via Presidential Statement.”
- There were severe damages resulting from the guilt-by-association system. The family members of the deceased by way of the Incident, regardless of being innocent or guilty, were under strict observation and experienced limited social engagement, in the absence of any legal grounds for this treatment. Despite the system being revoked in 1981, there was continued psychological damage experienced by family members of the deceased.

== See also ==
- Jeju uprising
- Jeju 4.3 Peace Park
- Truth and Reconciliation Commission (South Korea)
- Truth commission
- Transitional justice
- Mass killings under communist regimes
