= Jeju uprising =

1948–1949 insurgency in South Korea

- Part of the division of Korea and the Cold War in Asia
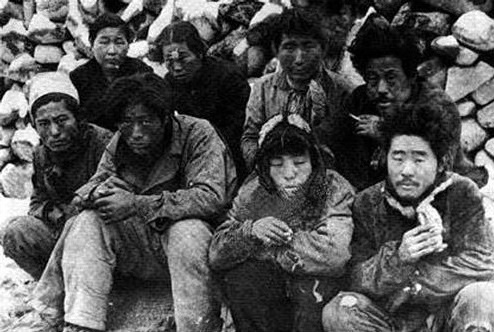
- Jeju inhabitants awaiting execution in late 1948
Date	3 April 1948 – 13 May 1949 (1 year, 1 month, 1 week and 3 days)
Location	Jeju Province, South Korea
Result	Uprising suppressed

Belligerents
Workers' Party of South Korea	United States Army Military Government in Korea (until August 1948); First Republic of Korea (from August 1948); Right-wing militias: Northwest Youth League; Korean Youth League

Commanders and leaders
Kim Dal-sam; Pak Hon-yong	William F. Dean (until August 1948); Syngman Rhee; Kim Ik-ryeol

Casualties and losses
Several thousand killed (Note: 2,345 killed from March to May 1949 alone)	162 soldiers killed 289 policemen killed 640 militias killed Total: 1,091 killed
- 14,373 civilians killed (86% by security forces and 14% by insurgents); 30,000 total dead including combatants Other estimates reach as high as 80,000

- Jeju uprising
- Hangul: 제주 4·3 사건
- Hanja: 濟州四三事件
- RR: Jeju 4·3 sageon
- MR: Cheju 4·3 sakŏn

The Jeju uprising (Korean: 제주 4·3 사건; lit. 'Jeju April 3 incident') was an armed uprising in Jeju Island, South Korea, by the Workers' Party of South Korea (WPSK) that began on 3 April 1948 and was ultimately suppressed by May 1949 by the military, which employed indiscriminate violence against Jeju residents. The Encyclopedia of Korean Culture defines the start date of the incident as 1 March 1947, when police opened fire during a March First Movement commemoration in Jeju, and the end date as 21 September 1954, when the restricted-access zone around Hallasan mountain was fully opened.

Tensions on Jeju Island escalated with protests following a police assault incident during the 1947 March First Movement commemoration and the suppression of those protests which resulted in 6 deaths. A general strike was later organized by the Workers' Party of South Korea from February to March 1948, protesting against the general election scheduled in the United States-occupied half of the peninsula. Kim Dal-sam, the head of the WPSK in Jeju, formed a guerrilla organization to take up arms, and launched an insurgency in April 1948, attacking South Korean police facilities and officers, and right-wing civilians.

Following independence in August 1948, the First Republic of Korea (ROK) under President Syngman Rhee escalated the suppression of the uprising on Jeju Island by declaring martial law in November and beginning an "eradication campaign" against insurgents in the rural areas of Jeju in March 1949, defeating them within two months. The ROK executed many insurgents and their supporters causing some to refer to this campaign as the Jeju massacre. Upon the outbreak of the Korean War in June 1950, many imprisoned insurgents and supporters were extrajudicially executed, and the existence of the uprising was officially censored and repressed in South Korea for several decades.

The Jeju uprising and its repression were notable for its extreme violence; between 14,000 and 30,000 people (10 percent of Jeju's population) were killed, and 40,000 fled to Japan. Other estimates reach as high as 80,000 dead. Atrocities and war crimes were committed by both sides, but historians have noted that the methods used by the South Korean government to suppress protesters and rebels were especially cruel, with violence against civilians by pro-government forces giving rise to the Yeosu–Suncheon rebellion in South Jeolla Province during the conflict. According to Bruce Cumings, right-wing paramilitary groups, including the North-West Youth Association, were especially brutal towards civilians, exercising more authority than the police. Some historians and scholars, including military historian Allan R. Millett, regard the Jeju uprising as the true beginning of the Korean War.

In October 2003, the National Committee for Investigation of the Truth about the Jeju April 3 Incident chaired by South Korean prime minister Goh Kun released a comprehensive report detailing the violence that occurred during the uprising, and South Korean president Roh Moo-hyun issued an official apology on behalf of the South Korean government. In 2019, the South Korean police and the defense ministry apologized for their involvement in the massacres during the Jeju uprising.

== Background ==
=== Political situation in Korea ===
After Imperial Japan surrendered to Allied forces on August 15, 1945, the 35-year Japanese occupation of Korea ended. Korea was subsequently divided by the allied powers along the 38th parallel, with the Soviet Union overseeing the north and the United States the south. In September 1945, Lt. General John R. Hodge established a military government to administer the southern region, including Jeju Island. In December 1945, representatives from the US, Soviet Union, and United Kingdom met to discuss a joint trusteeship. However, a lack of consensus led the US to bring the "Korean question" to the United Nations. On November 14, 1947, the United Nations General Assembly passed Resolution 112, calling for a general election in Korea on May 10, 1948, under the supervision of the United Nations Temporary Commission on Korea (UNTCOK).

Fearing a loss of influence over northern Korea, the Soviet Union rejected the UN resolution and barred UNTCOK from entering the region. The UNTCOK nevertheless proceeded with the elections, albeit only in the southern half of the peninsula. In response, the Soviet Union organized its own elections in the north on August 25, 1948.

=== Political situation on Jeju Island ===
Residents of Jeju island were among the most active participants in the Korean independence movement against colonial Japanese occupation. Due to the island's relative isolation from the mainland peninsula, Jeju experienced relative peace after the Japanese surrender, contrasting with the period of heavy unrest in southern mainland Korea. The period following the Japanese surrender saw the formation of People's Committees, local autonomous councils tasked with coordinating the transition towards Korean independence. When the American military government was established in Jeju in late 1945, the Jeju People's Council was the only existing government on the island. As a testament to the island's relative stability, the United States Army Military Government in Korea (USAMGIK) governor John R. Hodge stated in October 1947 that Jeju was "a truly communal area that is peacefully controlled by the People's Committee without much Comintern influence."

The Jeju People's Committee had come under the control of the Workers' Party of South Korea (WPSK) by late 1946. The WPSK encouraged the People's Council to establish military and political committees, as well as mass organizations. The 1946 USAMGIK dissolution of the provisional People's Republic of Korea and their associated People's Committees on the mainland sparked the Autumn Uprising of 1946, which did not spread to Jeju (as its People's Committee still operated largely undisturbed by the American military government) but did contribute to rising tensions on the island. However, since the 2000s, some South Korean liberal scholars and families of the victims of the uprising have argued that the Jeju People's Committee had nothing to do with directive of the WPSK.

== Incidents leading up to the uprising ==
=== Sam-il demonstrations ===
Starting a year before the planned nationwide elections of May 1948, residents of Jeju started protesting against holding the planned elections. Particularly concerned about permanently dividing the peninsula, the WPSK planned protests on March 1, 1947, to denounce the elections and celebrate the anniversary of the March First Movement (also known as the Sam-il Movement). The protests were further emboldened following an incident where police dispersing protests fired indiscriminately into a crowd, killing six civilians, including a six-year-old child. (Note: U.S. State Department analyst John Merrill originally reported that only one person was killed, a six-year-old child. However, this conflicts with the official G-2 Periodic Report given by the 6th Infantry Division, the division responsible for firing on the protesters. The G-2 report states that 6 civilians were killed.)

=== Chong-myon jail incident ===
On March 8, 1947, a crowd of about a thousand demonstrators gathered at the Chong-myon jail, demanding the release of WPSK members who been arrested during the Sam-il demonstrations by military government. When the demonstrators started throwing rocks and stormed the jail, the police opened fire, killing five people. In response, the WPSK called on the military government to take action against the police officers responsible. Instead, 400 police officers were brought in from the mainland. In addition, members of the far-right paramilitary group known as the Northwest Youth League also arrived on Jeju. Although both the police and paramilitary groups employed violent and harsh tactics in their suppression of protests, the Northwest Youth League was especially ruthless and has been described as terroristic.

=== February 1948 general strike ===
As the May 10, 1948 elections approached, WPSK leaders hardened in their opposition to the involvement of the United Nations Temporary Commission on Korea (UNTCOK) in Korean affairs, as they believed the elections would formalize the 38th parallel partition as a permanent border, making a unified and independent Korea no longer possible. In January 1948, Pak Hon-yong, the leader of the WPSK, had called on WPSK members south of the 38th parallel to oppose the elections by whatever means necessary, and called for a general strike to begin on February 7. According to John Merril, there were at least 60,000 WPSK members on Jeju at this point, as well as at least 80,000 active supporters who were not members. The WPSK went on strike and its members also sometimes attacked government installations and engaged in armed fighting with police forces and rightist militias. These clashes continued through March 1948.

== Rebellion ==
=== April 3, 1948 ===
Although armed clashes had been taking place on Jeju Island since early 1947, the typical start date cited for the beginning of the Jeju uprising is April 3, 1948. Some sources cite an incident where military police "fired on a demonstration commemorating the Korean struggle against Japanese rule", igniting mass insurrection. Other sources, however, make no mention of this demonstration incident, and state that WPSK plans to attack on April 3 had been planned well in advance. Whatever the case, at approximately 02:00, around 500 WPSK guerrillas alongside up to 3,000 sympathizers attacked Northwest Youth League positions as well as 11 of the 24 police stations on the island, killing 30 police officers, specifically targeting those who were known to have previously collaborated with Japanese colonial authorities.

Lieutenant General Kim Ik-ryeol, commander of police forces on the island, attempted to end the uprising peacefully by negotiating with the rebels. He met several times with rebel leader Kim Dal-sam of the WPSK but neither side could agree on conditions. The government demanded a complete rebel surrender, while the rebels demanded disarmament of the local police, dismissal of all governing officials on the island, prohibition of paramilitary groups, and the re-unification of the Korean peninsula.

In the wake of these failed peace negotiations, the fighting continued. The US military government responded to guerrilla activity by transferring another regiment to Jeju from Busan and deploying police companies, each 1,700 strong, from the southern provinces of the mainland. The guerrillas retreated to their bases in the forests and caves around Hallasan, Jeju's central volcano and the highest mountain in South Korea. On April 29, the Korean, non-military, governor of Jeju province abandoned his post and defected, to the guerrillas. This caused many police officers to do the same and defect. In response, US military provincial governor William F. Dean ordered a purge of WPSK sympathizers from the ranks of the Korean constabulary, and three sergeants were summarily executed.

Fighting continued through the May 10 elections. A total of 214 people had been killed by then. During election week, the guerrillas "cut telephone lines, destroyed bridges, and blocked roads with piles of stones to disrupt communications." The WPSK Women's League campaigned for residents to hide in the mountainous region controlled by guerillas the night before the election so they could not be forced to vote at gunpoint, and thousands did. Many election officials declined to show up. These campaigns, along with sporadic arson, violent demonstrations and attacks on government installations on election day led to a low turnout. Jeju had the lowest turnout in all of South Korea, so low that the two seats reserved for Jeju province in the new national assembly were left vacant.

Fearing an upsurge in guerrilla activities after they succeeded in disrupting the election, General Dean requested a US Navy blockade of the island on May 11, so that rebel sympathizers from the mainland could not reach Jeju. The Navy sent the USS John R. Craig to enforce the blockade.

=== August 1948 underground elections and Yeosu rebellion ===
Although guerrilla activity lessened during the summer months of 1948, they picked up again in August after the Soviet Union held elections north of the 38th parallel to form the Democratic People's Republic of Korea (DPRK). In conjunction with these elections, the Workers' Party of North Korea (WPNK) organized "underground elections" for those wanting to participate south of the 38th parallel, including on Jeju Island. Although the turnout of these elections is disputed, (Note: U.S. intelligence estimated a voter turnout of 25 percent, while the DPRK reported a 77 percent turnout.) they succeeded at emboldening WPSK military forces. In the months following the elections, conditions worsened to the point that Republic of Korea (ROK) officials decided to send the Fourteenth Regiment of the Korean Constabulary, stationed near the southern port city of Yeosu, to Jeju Island to assist counter-insurgency operations. However, on October 20, 1948, thousands of soldiers mutinied in protest before they were due to be dispatched to Jeju. They killed many high-ranking officers and those who had collaborated with the Japanese and seized Yeosu and surrounding areas before retreating into the areas around Jirisan mountain and setting up guerrilla bases, similar to what the Jeju rebels did while hiding out in Hallasan. Embarrassed by this incident, Syngman Rhee, the newly elected president of the ROK, intensified the government's efforts to suppress the rebellion. On November 17, 1948, Syngman Rhee proclaimed martial law in on Jeju. During this period, ROK forces engaged in numerous war crimes. In one report incident on December 14, 1948, ROK forces attacked a small village and kidnapped many young men and girls. The girls were gang-raped over a two-week period and then executed along with the young men.

By the end of 1948, the ROK's harsh and effective suppression campaigns had reduced the number of guerrilla forces to just 300.

=== WPSK's 1949 New Year offensive and the ROK's eradication campaign ===
On January 1, 1949, the guerrillas launched one last offensive against ROK police. They attacked in Odong-ni and Jeju City, but were pushed back by ROK police and driven to the island's interior mountains. ROK police pursued the guerrillas and continued to commit atrocities, including rounding up whole villages and massacring residents. The ROK forces, now determined to destroy the remaining WPSK guerrillas, launched an eradication campaign in March 1949. During the campaign, 2,345 guerrillas and 1,668 civilians were killed. With the campaign now effectively over, the ROK held elections on Jeju Island to fill the province's empty seats in the National Assembly; Jeju Island was now effectively and symbolically under ROK jurisdiction.

== United States involvement ==
At the beginning of the uprising, the island was controlled by the United States Army Military Government in Korea.

Only a small number of Americans were present. Jimmie Leach, a captain in the US Army, was an adviser to the South Korean Constabulary and claimed that there were six Americans on the island, including himself, and that they could call on two small L-4 scout planes and two old minesweepers converted to coastal cutters, manned by Korean crews. On March 8, 1949, the US Armed Forces sent an investigation team headed by Colonel James A. Casteel to Jeju to investigate the causes of the rebellion. They summarized that the February 1948 Jeju general strike prior to the rebellion was caused by instigation by the WPSK and hostility towards the police as a result of shootings. They also described the strike as "communist inspired" but participated by both the left and right in response to the March 1 shootings. By the spring of 1949 four South Korean Army battalions arrived and joined the local constabulary, police forces, and right-wing Northwest Youth Association partisans to suppress protests. The combined forces quickly destroyed or disabled most of the remaining rebel forces. On June 7, 1949, the leadership of the movement fell apart following the killing of major rebel leader Lee Deok-gu. The US military later called the complete destruction of Jungsangan village a "successful operation." The National Committee for the Investigation of the Truth about the Jeju April 3 Incident concluded that the US Army Military Government in Korea and the Korean Military Advisory Group shared responsibility for the incident as it began under the rule of the military government and an American colonel was in charge of the security forces of Jeju until August 1948. According to Heo Hojun (허호준), US liaison aircraft helped to arrest and kill villagers who evacuated to middle mountain area. Song Yo Chan (송요찬), commander of punitive forces in Jeju during late 1948, show appreciation to Fred M. Erricson who helped punitive operation and noticed the rally point, command post of Rebel forces and battle situation between Rebel and Punitive forces by reconnaissance flight.

After the outbreak of the Korean War, the US assumed command of the South Korean armed forces. Brigadier General William Lynn Roberts commanded Americans on Jeju.

The US military documented massacres but did not intervene. On May 13, 1949, the US ambassador to South Korea wired Washington that the Jeju rebels and their sympathizers had been, "killed, captured, or converted." Stars and Stripes reported on the South Korean Army's suppression of the rebellion, local support for the rebels, as well as rebel retaliation against local rightist opponents.

== Korean War ==
Immediately after the North Korean invasion of South Korea, the South Korean military ordered the "preemptive apprehension" of suspected leftists nationwide. Thousands were detained on Jeju and then sorted into four groups, labeled A, B, C and D, based on the perceived security risks each posed. On August 30, 1950, a written order by a senior intelligence officer in the South Korean Navy instructed Jeju's police to "execute all those in groups C and D by firing squad no later than September 6."

== Aftermath ==
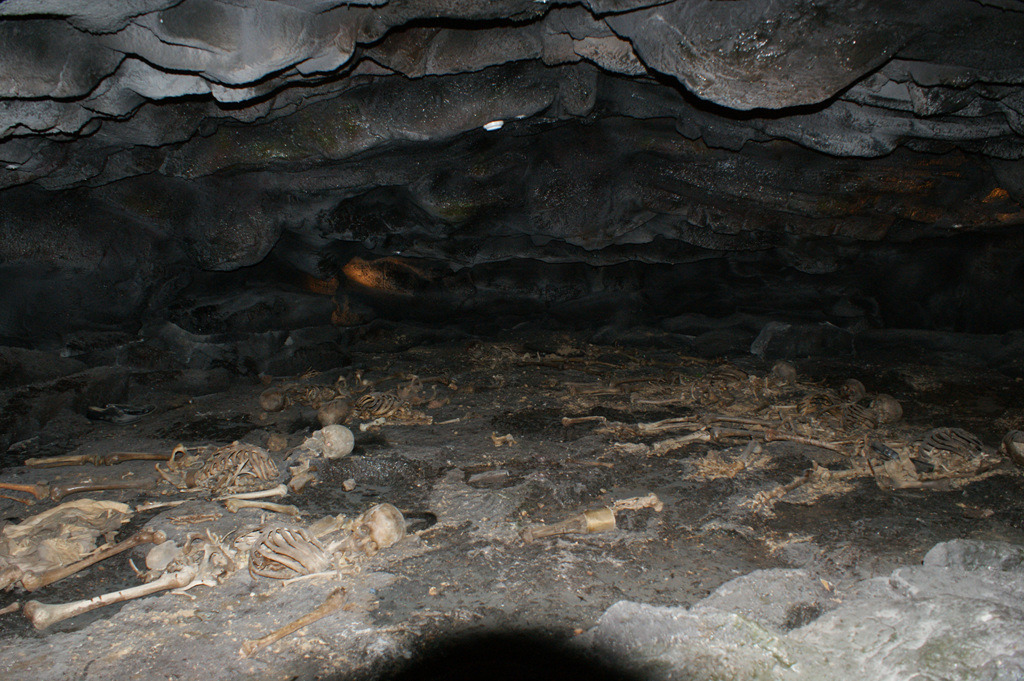
Recreation of the Darangswi cave massacre

In one of its first official acts, the South Korean National Assembly passed the National Traitors Act in 1948, which among other measures, outlawed the Workers Party of South Korea. For almost fifty years after the uprising, it was a crime punishable by beatings, torture, and a lengthy prison sentence if any South Korean even mentioned the events of the Jeju uprising. The event had been largely ignored by the government. In 1992, President Roh Tae Woo's government sealed up a cave on Mount Halla, where the remains of massacre victims had been discovered. After civil rule was reinstated in the 1990s, the government admitted that the events on Jeju Island had taken place.

In 2003, the National Committee for Investigation of the Truth about the Jeju April 3 Incident chaired by South Korean prime minister Goh Kun described the event as a genocide. In October 2003, President Roh Moo-hyun apologized to the populace of Jeju for the brutal suppression of the uprising: "Due to wrongful decisions of the government, many innocent people of Jeju suffered many casualties and destruction of their homes." In March 2009, the Truth and Reconciliation Commission revealed, "At least 20,000 people jailed for taking part in the popular uprisings in Jeju, Yeosu and Suncheon, accused of being communists, were massacred in some 20 prisons across the country," when the Korean War broke out.

The commission reported 14,373 victims during the uprising, 86 percent at the hands of the security forces and 14 percent at the hands of armed rebels, and estimated that the total death toll was as high as 30,000. The commission listed the number of confirmed deaths at each stage of the incident; 104 deaths from March 3, 1947, to April 4, 1948; 214 deaths during the initial armed uprising from April 4 to May 10; and 637 deaths during armed conflict from May 11 to October 10. The most violent period was from October 11, 1948, to March 1, 1949, with 9,709 confirmed deaths. There were a further 2,668 confirmed deaths between March 3, 1949, and June 24, 1950. 800 more deaths occurred on Jeju up to 21 September 1954. The commission confirmed 7,624 victims of the security forces, and 1,528 victims of the armed rebels. Further, they confirmed 448 victims of systematic civilian massacres.

Around 230 of the island's 400 villages were burned to the ground, with over 39,000 houses destroyed. Only 170 villages remained afterwards. In 2008, bodies of massacre victims were discovered in a mass grave near Jeju International Airport. Estimates of the overall deaths of the 1948–1950 uprising run as high as 100,000.

== Investigation and reparation ==
The first joint memorial service of the victims on April 3, 1994 in Jeju

In 2003, South Korea's National Committee for the Investigation of the Truth concluded that the US Army military government and the Korean military shared responsibility for the incident. On October 31, 2003, South Korean president Roh Moo-hyun offered an apology to the victims of the Jeju incident. On March 28, 2008, the Korea Institute of Science and Technology opened a chemical aid project in Bonggae-dong, Jeju as part of a joint compensation program for the Jeju April 3 incident.

In January 2019, the Jeju District Court overturned military court rulings that imprisoned Jeju Islanders, clearing the names of the 18 surviving plaintiffs and recognizing them as wronged victims of the Jeju April 3 Uprising and Massacre. At the 71st commemoration of Jeju uprising, April 3, 2019, the South Korean police and defense ministry apologized for the first time over the massacres.

In 2025, the Revealing Truth: Jeju 4·3 Archives, a series of documents related to the event, was included in the Memory of the World Programme by UNESCO.

== Controversies ==
=== Suppression of discussion ===
Families of victims of the uprising and associated massacres, as well as various civic organizations, continuously attempted to openly discuss the uprising but the national government suppressed all materials and discussions, and even made the topic of the uprising illegal. The first published recollection in South Korea of the massacre was the 1978 novel Suni Samchon (Aunt Suni) which is set during the event. However, it was swiftly banned by the ROK government and its author, Hyun Ki-young, was arrested and tortured for three days by the National Intelligence Service.

However, on November 23, 1998, after the democratization of South Korea, President Kim Dae-jung stated that "the Jeju uprising was a communist rebellion, but there are a lot of people who died under false accusations as innocents, so now we have to reveal the truth and clear their false charges." On December 26, 1999, the National Assembly passed a bill, 'A special law for the Jeju uprising truth ascertainment and the regaining impaired reputation of the victims'. On January 12, 2000, the National Assembly legislated a law so the Korean government could begin conducting an investigation of the uprising. Due to this decision, it could be possible to expand the human rights of the residents of Jeju. On October 15, 2003, a truth ascertainment committee of the Jeju uprising was assembled according to the special law, and ascertained a fact-finding report of the Jeju uprising. In line with the finding of the committee, on October 31, 2003, former president Roh Moo-hyeon admitted that the brutal suppression of the uprising was a massive abuse of governmental power and made a public apology to the people of Jeju on behalf of the Republic of Korea. On the 71st anniversary of the event, the defense ministry and police under the Moon Jae-in administration apologized for the past government's role in the Jeju massacre.

=== Textbook inclusion ===
Despite ongoing efforts, controversy over the representation of the Jeju Uprising in public memory and education has persisted. For many decades, the incident was absent or misrepresented in South Korean school textbooks. In 2017, media outlets noted that elementary school textbooks continued to distort the causes and background of the Jeju Uprising, and concerns were raised in 2022 that the incident might be removed altogether from the national curriculum under the Yoon Suk-yeol administration. The Ministry of Education's 2022 Revised Curriculum deleted specific "learning elements" referring to the uprising, prompting public backlash from civic groups, the Jeju Provincial Office of Education, and the Jeju 4.3 Bereaved Families Association. Critics argued that the curriculum's focus on "liberal democracy" risked justifying the historical division of the Korean Peninsula while omitting key anti-colonial and unification movements such as the Jeju Uprising.

In response to public pressure, the National Education Commission revised the curriculum in late 2022 to include explicit reference to the uprising. As of 2023, the Jeju Provincial Office of Education reported that content related to the incident had been included in all seven middle school and all nine high school history textbooks approved by the Ministry of Education. Textbooks began to feature more comprehensive accounts, not only of the April 3, 1948 uprising itself, but also the March 1, 1947 police shooting that preceded it, the military's scorched-earth operations, and subsequent truth and reconciliation efforts. Nevertheless, discrepancies remained. Some publishers inaccurately described victims as "rebel forces" or used incorrect legal terminology, prompting calls for further revisions. Testimonies of sexual and gender-based violence, particularly against women, have received limited attention in public discourse and educational materials. The Jeju education authorities have continued to advocate for accurate, objective, and consistent representation of the Jeju 4.3 Incident in textbooks.

=== Calls for US government apology ===
At a symposium about the uprising at the Woodrow Wilson Center in Washington, D.C. in 2022, participants called on the United States government to apologize for its role in the incident. One participant called on then United States president Joe Biden and South Korea's then president Yoon Suk Yeol to visit the Jeju 4.3 Peace Park.

== In popular media ==
=== Novels ===
- Suni Samchon (1978) by Hyun Ki-young
- Kazantō by Kim Sok-pom
- The Island of Sea Women (2019) by Lisa See
- We Do Not Part (2021) by Han Kang

=== Films ===
- Jiseul (2012) by O Muel
- Hallan (2025) by Ha Myung-mi
- My Name (2026) by Chung Ji-young

=== Documentary ===
- First episode of Now It Can Be Told (1999-2005) by Munhwa Broadcasting Corporation

=== Song ===
- "The Southern Province That Doesn't Sleep" (잠들지 않는 남도, 1987) by Ahn Chi-hwan

=== Painting ===
- Camellia Falls (동백꽃 지다, 1991) by Kang Yo-bae

== See also ==
- Anti-communist mass killings
- List of massacres in South Korea
- Yeosu–Suncheon rebellion
