= Operation Blossom =

1950–1952 Korean War operation

Operation Blossom was a covert operation that was formed by the Office of Policy Coordination (OPC) in 1950. Although one of many Korean War strategies, the main intent of this operation was to create a resistance during war times in North Korea. The OPC took refugees that emerged from North Korea and provided them necessary information and supplies to complete the operation. These groups of refugees would return to North Korea and attempt to infiltrate the Communist country.

The hopes of success lied in the ability of the civilian population to go along with the resistance. The results of the operation were varied: some of the Blossom operators could not be contacted again while some could be reached until 1951. The following year there was no indication that the operation was still in place and functioning. A conclusion was made that all the members were acting as double agents, captured, or were known operators and could no longer create a resistance.

In September 1952, the suspicion was confirmed that the remaining operators were working for both sides and were terminated. The operation ended in late-1952.

== See also ==
- Covert missions during the Korean War
