= Kim Dal-sam =

South Korean revolutionary (1923–1950)

- Born: Yi Song-jin; 1923; Jeju Island, Zenranan Province, Korea, Empire of Japan
- Died: 20 March 1950 (aged 26–27); Jeongseon County, South Korea
- Occupations: political activist, revolutionary guerilla, school teacher
- Years active: 1945–1950
- Known for: Leading role in Jeju uprising

Korean name
- Hangul: 이승진
- Hanja: 李承晉
- RR: I Seungjin
- MR: I Sŭngjin

Pseudonym
- Hangul: 김달삼
- Hanja: 金達三
- RR: Gim Dalsam
- MR: Kim Talsam

Kim Dal-sam (Korean: 김달삼; 1923 – 20 March 1950) was a South Korean school teacher, Japanese military officer, and communist revolutionary and guerrilla fighter. He led insurgents of the Workers' Party of South Korea during the Jeju uprising against the First Republic of Korea under President Syngman Rhee.

== Background ==
Kim Dal-sam was born Yi Song-jin (이승진) in 1923 and grew up on Jeju Island in Zenranan Province, Korea, Empire of Japan. During Japanese occupation, Kim spent time in Osaka, Japan before moving to Tokyo to study mathematics at Chuo University (Tokyo Central University). During World War II, Kim enrolled in a Japanese military academy and was commissioned as a second lieutenant. In January 1945, Kim married the daughter of a man named Kang Mun-seok, who likely influenced him to develop communist leanings.

After World War II, Kim taught Marxism–Leninism at a middle school in Jeju Province. He also became quite active in politics, serving as an organizer and director for the Workers Party of South Korea (WPSK) in the late 1940s. Kim was an outspoken critic of Koreans who collaborated with the Japanese during occupation and often protested against the government police force on Jeju, demanding unification with the North. Kim was vehemently opposed to the elections planned for 10 May 1948 by the United Nations Temporary Commission on Korea (UNTCOK) because he thought they would further reinforce Korean division. In order to prevent these elections from happening, Kim led an armed rebellion against the government police forces on the island on 3 April 1948, which became known as the Jeju uprising.

== Role in the Jeju uprising ==
As a leader in the Military Committee of the WPSK Jeju branch, Kim, along with Cho No-gu, planned the 3 April 1948 attacks on government police forces one month prior, in March 1948. When the uprising commenced, Kim's forces included 400 guerilla fighters and 4,000 members of "self-defense" groups located throughout the island.

On 28 April 1948, the fighting on Jeju stopped as Kim Dal-sam met with the leader of the police forces on the island, Kim Ik-ryeol, to negotiate a truce. Kim Dal-sam's demands included "the surrender of all police forces, the confiscation of all weapons, punishment of police and rightists who had committed atrocities, withdrawal of rightist youth groups, and assurances that the May 10 elections would be cancelled." Kim Ik-ryeol refused Kim Dal-sam's demands and hostilities started again three days later.

In August 1948, with the uprising in full-swing, Kim left Jeju to attend a conference of the Korean Communist party (KCP) on the border town of Haeju, North Korea. At the conference, Kim reported on the positive developments on Jeju, to which the other participants responded with "thunderous applause." It was at this same conference that KCP and Soviet Union officials held elections to establish North Korea. Kim returned to Jeju in early to mid-September.

== After the Jeju uprising and death ==
After South Korean forces crushed the Jeju uprising in March 1949, Kim left Jeju for mainland Korea in order to enter the DPRK. On 20 March 1950, Kim's body was found among the dead in the aftermath of a guerrilla battle at Jeongseon County, before the full-scale Korean War began.
