= Kim Ik-ryeol =

South Korean soldier (1921–1988)

Kim Ik-ryeol (Korean: 김익렬; 1921–1988), also romanized as Kim Ik Ruhl and Kim Ing-nyol, was an officer in the Republic of Korea military and leader of government forces on Jeju Province during the first month of the Jeju uprising.

== Background ==
Kim Ik-ryeol was born in Katō-gun, Keishōnan-do, Japanese Korea, in 1921. During World War II, he attended a Japanese military academy and entered the Japanese military as a first lieutenant. After the war, Kim entered an English school for language training and graduated in 1946.

In September 1947, Kim, now a major in the army, was assigned to the Seventh Brigade, 9th Regiment, the regiment tasked with administering Jeju Province. In February 1948, he was promoted to colonel and took charge of the 9th Regiment.

== Role in the Jeju uprising ==
On April 28, 1948, nearly a month into the Jeju uprising, a leftist rebellion against government police forces on Jeju, Kim Ik-ryeol attempted to negotiate an armistice with the leader of the South Korean Labor party (SKLP) military on Jeju, Kim Dal-sam. The peace accord failed, however, mainly because Kim Ik-ryeol considered Kim Dal-sam’s demands impossible. On May 6, 1948, Kim Ik-ryeol was replaced by Colonel Park Jin-gyeong as commander of government police forces on Jeju.

== Later years ==
Kim served in the military through the Korean War and beyond. In 1967, he served as the Dean of Defense at the ROK National War College. After leaving the military, Kim served as president of the Korea Auto Industries Cooperative Association from May 1979 until February 1981. He died in 1988 and was buried at the South Korean National Cemetery in December 1988.
