= North-West Youth Association =

Far-right South Korean paramilitary group

- Active: 30 November 1946–19 December 1948
- Country: South Korea
- Type: Paramilitary
- Engagements: Jeju uprising

- North-West Youth Association
- Hangul: 서북청년회
- Hanja: 西北青年會
- RR: Seobuk cheongnyeonhoe
- MR: Sŏbuk ch'ŏngnyŏnhoe

Flag of the North-West Youth Association

The North-West Youth Association(Korean: 서북청년회), also known as the Northwest Youth League, was a far-right and radical anti-communist South Korean paramilitary group active during the Cold War. It mostly consisted of right-wing refugees from the Soviet-occupied northwestern region of Korea.

== History ==
The North-West Youth Association was established on November 30, 1946, by anticommunists from Soviet-occupied North Korea, described by the Jeju 4.3 Peace Park Museum as "a group of landowners who were forced to leave North Korea due to the political climate there including land reform and a crackdown on pro-Japanese factions."

The Association conducted vigilante justice against suspected communists with no legal basis, with support of Syngman Rhee. A communist uprising in Jeju occurred between 1948 and 1949, followed by a violent suppression campaign. According to Bruce Cumings, the Association was brutal towards the residents of Jeju Island, exercising more authority than the police. Between 14,000 and 30,000 people were killed during the Jeju uprising – 86% by security forces and paramilitary groups, including the North-West Youth Association, and 14% by rebels. Survivors give accounts describing the torture of children and mass murder. The violent crackdown created deep resentment in Jeju residents. What began as an anti-communist movement quickly became a force that sought to crush anyone opposed to President Rhee and the Korea Democratic Party.

The organization was largely disbanded by the South Korean government after the Korean War. During the 1950s, some former members were active as organized political gangs, which lost its power after Park Chung-hee came to power, who pledged to eradicate the "bad remnants" of the Syngman Rhee era.

== See also ==
- Horim Unit
