= People's Republic of Korea =

1945–1946 provisional government

People's Republic of Korea 조선인민공화국 朝鮮人民共和國
- 1945–1946
- Top: Flag of Korea; Bottom: Flag of the People's Committees; Emblem
- Motto: 자주독립국가 (Chajudongnip kukka) "Self-reliant and independent state"
- Anthem: 애국가 (Aegukka) "The Patriotic Song"
- Capital and largest city: Seoul
- Common languages: Korean
- Government: Provisional government
- President
  - 1945–1946: Syngman Rhee (nominal)
- Chairman of the National People's Representative Conference
  - 1945: Lyuh Woon-hyung (temporary)
- Historical era: Cold War
  - Surrender of Japan: 15 August 1945
  - Soviet forces stationed in Pyongyang: 24 August 1945
  - PRK established: 6 September 1945
  - American forces stationed in Seoul: 9 September 1945
  - PRK dissolved in the South: 12 December 1945
  - Committees co-opted in the North: 8 February 1946
- Currency: Korean won
Preceded by
Korea under Japanese rule
Succeeded by
1945: Soviet Civil Administration
United States Army Military Government in Korea
1946: Provisional People's Committee of North Korea
- Today part of: North Korea; South Korea

Korean name
- Hangul: 조선인민공화국
- Hanja: 朝鮮人民共和國
- RR: Joseon inmin gonghwaguk
- MR: Chosŏn inmin konghwaguk

The People's Republic of Korea (Korean: 조선인민공화국) was a short-lived provisional government that was organized at the time of the surrender of the Empire of Japan at the end of World War II. It was proclaimed on 6 September 1945, as Korea was being divided into two occupation zones, with the Soviet Union occupying the north and the United States occupying the south. Based on a network of people's committees, it presented a program of democratization of society and the economy.

In the south, the US military government declared the PRK to be illegitimate on 12 December 1945. In the north, under the auspice of the Soviet military government, the Korean Worker's Party led by Kim Il Sung took over the People's Committee by incorporating them into the political structure of the emerging Democratic People's Republic of Korea, commonly known as North Korea, and by exerting an ever-increasing direct influence on the agenda and structure of other smaller political parties (such as the KDP and the DIP).

== History ==
=== Establishment ===
On 15 August 1945, the Empire of Japan formally surrendered to the Allies and capitulated on 2 September. The Japanese occupational authorities requested that a government be established to ensure the safety of their persons and property after the occupation ended. Whilst the Soviet Union continued to fight the Empire of Japan in Chongjin, Endō Ryusaku, who served as the second-ranking member of the Japanese Government-General sought to secure the safe exit of the Japanese civilians at the request of Nobuyuki Abe. He proposed to Song Jin-woo that he take over the security and administrative rights of Korea, but when this was rejected, he asked to meet Lyuh Woon-hyung in Seoul. Under Lyuh's leadership, the newly formed Committee for the Preparation of Korean Independence (CPKI) organized people's committees throughout the country to coordinate the transition to independence. On 28 August 1945 the CPKI announced that it would function as the temporary national government of Korea. On 6 September, CPKI activists met in Seoul and established the PRK.

Security and administrative rights were transferred to Lyuh, and the safety of the Japanese evacuating the Korean Peninsula was guaranteed. Accordingly, Lyuh suggested the following conditions:

- Immediate release of political prisoners and economic prisoners across the country.
- Secure food for three months in August, September and October.
- Don't interfere with political activities.
- Don't interfere with the education of students and youth.
- Don't interfere with the mobilization of workers and peasants into workers' councils.

Accordingly, the Governor-General's Deputy Prime Minister accepted the terms. That night, Lyuh Woon-hyung launched the National Preparatory Committee, basing its structure on the Founding Alliance, an underground secret independence movement that he had formed a year before in August 1944. Subsequently, Lyuh released all the political prisoners in Seodaemun Prison. Two days after the founding of the National Preparatory Committee was established, a systematic organizational network was established, expanded and reorganized. Lyuh was elected chairman and An Jae-hong as Vice-chairman, who made the following declaration:

Founding Alliance Code

1. Each faction should unite with each other to establish a unified nation and restore the freedom and independence of the Korean people.
2. Cooperate to form a united front against Japan and eradicate any reactionary forces that hinder the complete independence of Korea.
3. In terms of construction, all efforts should be focused on the liberation of the democratic public.

Declaration of the National Preparatory Committee

Humanity longs for peace and history aims for development. With the end of the Second World War, an alleged tragedy of human thought, a day of liberation came to Korea. For the past half century, Korea has been a colony of imperial Japan, blocking the way to freedom in all respects from imperial exploitation and oppression. But we have been fighting for our liberation for the past 36 years. All movements and struggles to open the path to this free development have been stubbornly rejected by imperialism and the reactionary and anti-democratic forces that have colluded with it.

With the international resolution of the post-war problem, Korea moved away from the Japanese imperialist base. However, the liberation of the Korean people was only a new step in the ideological movement, so a great struggle for complete independence still remains, and a great task for the construction of a new nation lies in our hands. Then our current mission is to strive for complete independence and true democracy. Temporarily, the international forces will dominate us, but it will not hinder whether or not we will meet our democratic needs. All progressive struggles to eradicate feudal remnants and open the way for free development have been unfolded nationwide, and several progressive democratic forces in Korea are eager to form a unified front. By these social demands, our National Preparatory Committee was formed.

Therefore, the Preparatory Committee focuses on the construction of a new nation to reorganize our people into a truly democratic regime, and at the same time a completely liberated unified front, from all walks of life, to gather all progressive democratic forces. This is why a popular struggle against all anti-democratic reactionary forces is required: in the past, they colluded with Japanese imperialism to commit grave sins, and in the future they are likely to interfere with the construction of a new democracy, just like in Joseon. Fight against these reactionary forces, that is, anti-democratic forces, to overcome them and to realize true democracy. In order to do so, a strong democratic regime should be established. This regime will be composed of people's committees elected at the National People's Delegation Conference, and it is needless to say that the revolutionary warriors and organizations that have been committed to the Korean liberation movement abroad have to be greeted with respect. Thus, a completely new regime must emerge to represent the general consensus of the entire Korean people and to protect their interests. In the temporary transition period until the establishment of this new regime, the main committee maintains the security of Joseon independently and takes one step further In order to realize an independent state organization, the following code is set forth with the intention of fulfilling one provisional task of establishing a new regime.

Program

- We intend to build a completely independent country.
- We are committed to establishing a democratic regime that can fulfill the basic political, economic and social needs of the entire nation.
- We will maintain national order independently and secure public life in the temporary transition period.

=== Deployment ===
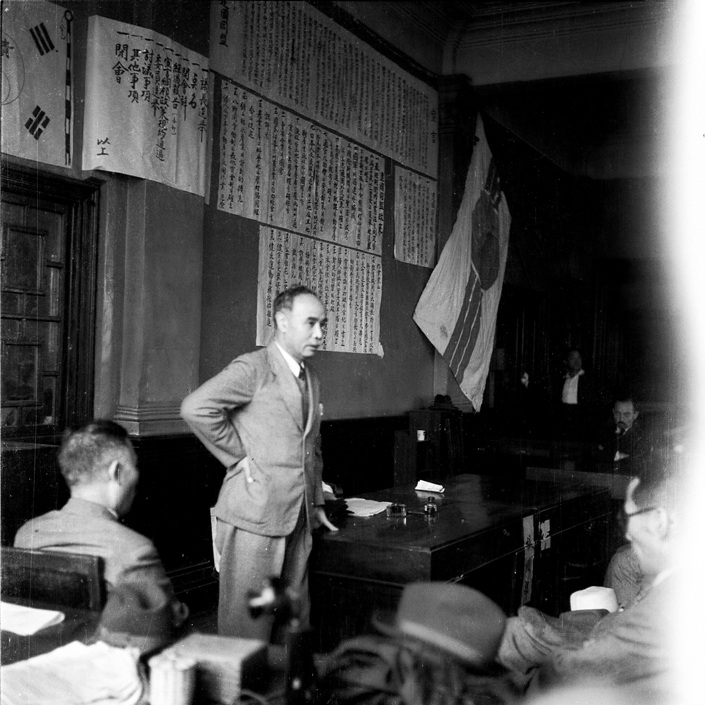
Associate Chairman Lyuh Woon-hyung giving a speech at a YMCA in Gyeongseong (16 August 1945)

The PRK has great significance in that it is the first Korean political organization to implement local autonomy, in the form of the people's committees. By the end of August, more than 140 committees were established nationwide in response to the support of the people. Later it was nominally nominate Syngman Rhee as PRK's leader, Kim Ku and Kim Kyu-sik were also invited to join the cabinet, but all of them refused.

The organizational work of the National Preparatory Committee was also carried out in North Korea. The leader in the North Korean region was Cho Man-sik, a native of Pyongyang, who 'took a non-violent yet uncompromising route' during the Japanese colonial period. Under different regional conditions in the south and north of the Korean Peninsula, Lyuh Woon-hyung and Cho Man-sik simultaneously launched the founding project.

The organization had different names and differences in composition, depending on whether it was led by communists or nationalists. It also provided a foundation for the construction of a new nation as a 'people's self-governing organization', created by both nationalists and socialists who had been engaged in the independence movement during the Japanese colonial period.

Seo Joong-seok, a professor of history at Sungkyunkwan University, said, 'If there was no organization like the people's committees after liberation, there would have been great confusion. This is because major independence movement groups, including the Provisional Government of the Republic of Korea, were far abroad. However, before the liberation, the founding alliance was organized mainly by domestic groups, who were able to voluntarily perform major tasks such as security and administration.'

=== Program ===
The program of the PRK was presented in its 14 September twenty-seven point program. The program included: "the confiscation without compensation of lands held by the Japanese and collaborators; free distribution of that land to the peasants; rent limits on the nonredistributed land; nationalization of such major industries as mining, transportation, banking, and communication; state supervision of small and mid-sized companies; ... guaranteed basic human rights and freedoms, including those of speech, press, assembly, and faith; universal suffrage to adults over the age of eighteen; equality for women; labor law reforms including an eight-hour day, a minimum wage, and prohibition of child labor; and "establishment of close relations with the United States, USSR, United Kingdom, and China, and positive opposition to any foreign influences interfering with the domestic affairs of the state." The motto of the PRK was, accordingly, "Self-reliant and independent state" (Korean: 자주독립국가; Hanja: 自主獨立國家; RR: Jajudongnip gukga; MR: Chajudongnip kukka).

== Developments ==
=== Communist takeover in the North ===
When Soviet troops entered Pyongyang on 24 August 1945, they found a local People's Committee established there, led by veteran Christian nationalist Cho Man-sik. While the Soviet authorities initially recognized and worked with the People's Committees, they made determined efforts to ensure that Koreans friendly to their political interests, especially Korean communists, were placed into positions of power.

By some accounts, Cho Man-sik was the Soviet government's first choice to lead North Korea. However in December 1945, at the Moscow Conference, the Soviet Union agreed to a US proposal for a trusteeship over Korea for up to five years in the lead-up to independence. Most Koreans demanded independence immediately, which included Cho Man-sik, who opposed the proposal at a public meeting on 4 January 1946. Afterwards, he disappeared into house arrest. He was replaced by Kim Il Sung, who alongside most of the Korean Communists had supported the trusteeship under pressure from the Soviet government. On 8 February 1946, the People's Committees were reorganized as Interim People's Committees dominated by Communists. The new regime instituted popular policies of land redistribution, industry nationalization, labor law reform, and equality for women. Meanwhile, existing Communist groups were reconstituted as the Workers' Party of Korea under Kim Il Sung's leadership.

After the failure of negotiations for unification, the Soviet authorities proclaimed the Democratic People's Republic of Korea (DPRK) on 10 July 1948, with Kim Il Sung appointed as premier on 9 September.

=== Suppression in the South ===
After the American arrival in September 1945, the United States Army Military Government in Korea controlled the peninsula south of the 38th parallel. The military governor Lieutenant-General John R. Hodge refused to recognize the PRK and its People's Committees, which were outlawed on 12 December. He later stated, "one of our missions was to break down this Communist government". On 19 July 1947, Lyuh Woon-hyung was assassinated by Han Ji-geun, a member of the far-right White Shirts Society.

Edgar Snow, an American journalist, returned to Korea after its liberation and stayed for two months to report on the situation:

The United States landed in Korea without any preparation. However, there was already a founding committee in Korea and soon after there was political preparation. If the Americans had saved the National Preparatory Committee, the construction of Korea would have been faster and more beneficial.

Some local units of the People's Republic remained active in the Jeolla region and especially on Jeju Island, where their presence, together with marauding anti-communist youth gangs, contributed to tensions that exploded in the events known as Jeju uprising of 1948–1949.

=== Countrywide ===
Early November saw the creation of the National Council of Korean Labor Unions (NCKLU) and its endorsement of PRK and its program. December saw the creation of the National League of Peasant Unions, the Korean Democratic Youth League, and the Women's League, and their support of the PRK.

== Central People's Committee ==
Portfolio	Officeholder
President	Syngman Rhee
Vice President	Lyuh Woon-hyung
Prime Minister	Ho Hon
Minister of Home Affairs	Kim Ku
Minister of Foreign Affairs	Kim Kyu-sik
Minister of Finance	Cho Man-sik
Minister of Military	Kim Won-bong
Minister of Economy	Ha Pilwon
Minister of Agriculture and Forestry	Bong Mi-seon
Minister of Health	Lee Man-Gyu
Minister of Transport	Hong Nam-pyo
Minister of Security	Choi Yong-Dal
Chief Justice	Kim Byung-ro
Minister of Education	Kim Seong-su
Minister of Propaganda	Kwan-Sul Lee
Minister of Communications	Sin Ik-hui
Minister of Labor	Lee Sang-Hyuk
General Secretary	Yi Kang-guk
Minister of Legal Affairs	Choi Ikhan
Minister of Planning	Jeong Baek

== See also ==
- Division of Korea
- Provisional Government of the Republic of Korea
