= Division of Korea =

Separation of North and South Korea

Closeup of the Korean Demilitarized Zone that surrounds the Military Demarcation Line

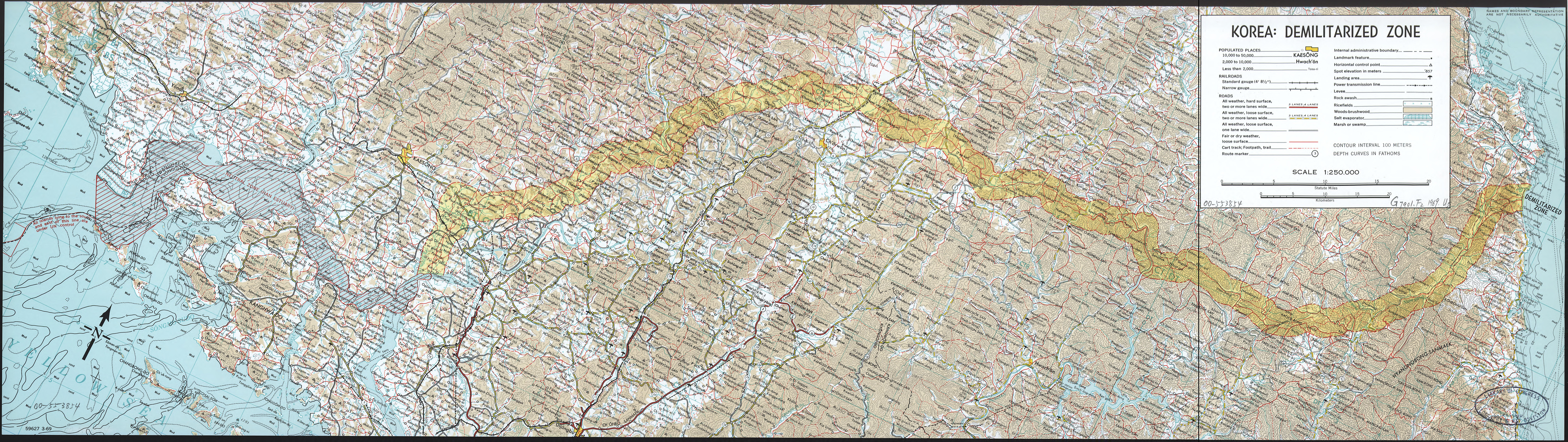
The Korean Peninsula was divided along the 38th parallel north from 1945 until 1950 and along the Military Demarcation Line from 1953 to present.

The division of Korea or the partition of Korea began at the end of World War II on 2 September 1945, with the establishment of a Soviet occupation zone in the north and a US occupation zone in the south. These zones developed into separate governments, named the Democratic People's Republic of Korea (North Korea) and the Republic of Korea (South Korea), which fought a war from 1950 to 1953. Since then the division has continued.

By the early 18th century, both countries were one single nation: the Korean Empire, only to be annexed by the Empire of Japan in 1910. During World War II, the Allied leaders had already been considering the question of Korea's future following Japan's eventual surrender in the war. The leaders reached an understanding that Korea would be removed from Japanese colonial control but would be placed under an international trusteeship until the Koreans would be deemed ready for self-rule. In the last days of the war, the United States proposed dividing the Korean peninsula into two occupation zones (a U.S. and Soviet one) with the 38th parallel as the dividing line. The Soviets accepted their proposal and agreed to divide Korea, which led to the declaration of General Order No. 1.

It was understood that this division was only a temporary arrangement until the trusteeship could be implemented. In December 1945, the Moscow Conference of Foreign Ministers resulted in an agreement on a five-year, four-power Korean trusteeship. However, with the onset of the Cold War and other factors both international and domestic, including Korean opposition to the trusteeship, negotiations between the United States and the Soviet Union over the next two years regarding the implementation of the trusteeship failed, thus effectively nullifying the only agreed-upon framework for the re-establishment of an independent and unified Korean state.

With this, the Korean question was referred to the United Nations. In 1948, after the UN failed to produce an outcome acceptable to the Soviet Union, UN-supervised elections were held in the US-occupied south only. Syngman Rhee won the election, while Kim Il Sung consolidated his position as the leader of Soviet-occupied northern Korea. This led to the establishment of the Republic of Korea in southern Korea on 15 August 1948, which promptly followed the establishment of the Democratic People's Republic of Korea in northern Korea on 9 September 1948. The United States supported the South, the Soviet Union supported the North, and each government claimed sovereignty over the whole Korean peninsula.

On 25 June 1950, North Korea invaded South Korea in an attempt to re-unify the peninsula under its communist rule. The subsequent Korean War, which lasted from 1950 to 1953, ended with a stalemate and has left Korea divided by the Korean Demilitarized Zone (DMZ) up to the present day.

== Historical background ==
=== Japanese rule (1910–1945) ===
When the Russo-Japanese War ended in 1905, Korea (then the Korean Empire) became a nominal protectorate of Japan and was formally annexed by Japan in 1910. Emperor Gojong was deposed. In the following decades, nationalist and radical groups emerged to struggle for independence. Divergent in their outlooks and approaches, these groups failed to come together in one national movement. The Korean Provisional Government (KPG) in-exile in the Republic of China failed to obtain widespread recognition until the onset of World War II.

=== World War II ===
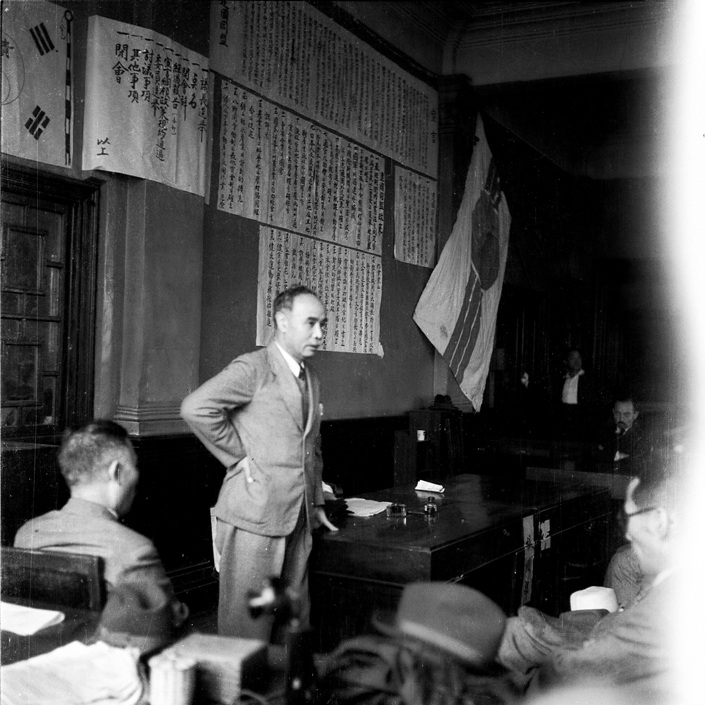
Lyuh Woon-hyung giving a speech in the Committee for Preparation of Korean Independence in Seoul on 16 August 1945

At the Cairo Conference in November 1943, in the middle of World War II, Franklin D. Roosevelt, Winston Churchill and Chiang Kai-shek agreed that Japan should lose all the territories it had conquered by force. At the end of the conference, the three powers declared that they were "mindful of the enslavement of the people of Korea, ... determined that in due course Korea shall become free and independent." Roosevelt floated the idea of a trusteeship over Korea but did not obtain agreement from the other powers. Roosevelt raised the idea with Joseph Stalin at the Tehran Conference in November 1943 and the Yalta Conference in February 1945. Stalin did not disagree but advocated that the period of trusteeship be short.

At the Tehran and Yalta Conferences, Stalin promised to join his allies in the Pacific War in two to three months after victory in Europe. On 8 August 1945, two days after the first atomic bomb was dropped on Hiroshima, but before the second bomb was dropped at Nagasaki, the USSR declared war on Japan. As war began, the Commander-in-Chief of Soviet Forces in the Far East, Marshal Aleksandr Vasilevsky, called on Koreans to rise up against Japan, saying "a banner of liberty and independence is rising in Seoul".

Soviet troops advanced rapidly, and the U.S. government became anxious that they would occupy the whole of Korea. On 10 August 1945 two young officers – Dean Rusk and Charles Bonesteel – were assigned to define an American occupation zone. Working on extremely short notice and completely unprepared, they used a National Geographic map to decide on the 38th parallel as the dividing line. They chose it because it divided the country approximately in half but would place the capital Seoul under American control. No experts on Korea were consulted. The two men were unaware that forty years before, Japan and pre-revolutionary Russia had discussed sharing Korea along the same parallel. Rusk later stated that if he had known Korean history, he "almost surely" would have chosen a different line.

The division placed sixteen million Koreans in the American zone and nine million in the Soviet zone. Rusk observed, "even though it was further north than could be realistically reached by US forces, in the event of Soviet disagreement ... we felt it important to include the capital of Korea in the area of responsibility of American troops". He noted that he was "faced with the scarcity of US forces immediately available, and time and space factors, which would make it difficult to reach very far north, before Soviet troops could enter the area". To the surprise of the Americans, the Soviet Union immediately accepted the division. The agreement was incorporated into General Order No. 1 (approved on 17 August 1945) for the surrender of Japan.

=== Liberation, confusion, and conflict ===
The Americans occupied the south

The Soviets occupied the north

On 10 August, Soviet forces entered northern Korea. Soviet forces began amphibious landings in Korea by 14 August and rapidly took over the northeast of the country, and on 16 August they landed at Wonsan. Japanese resistance was light, and Soviet forces secured most major cities in the north by 24 August (including Pyongyang, the second largest city in the Korean Peninsula after Seoul). Having fought Japan on Korean soil, the Soviet forces were well-received by Koreans.

Throughout August, there was a mix of celebration, confusion, and conflict, mainly caused by the lack of information provided to the Koreans by the Allies. The general public did not become aware of the division of Korea until around when the Soviets entered Pyongyang.

Meanwhile in Seoul, beginning in early to mid August, General Nobuyuki Abe, the last Japanese Governor-General of Chōsen (Korea), began contacting Koreans to offer them a leading role in the hand-over of power. He first offered the position to Song Jin-woo, the former head of The Dong-A Ilbo newspaper, who was seen as a champion of Korean independence within the peninsula. Song refused the position, which he saw as equivalent to the role of Wang Jingwei, the ruler of the Japanese puppet state in China. He instead preferred to wait until, as many expected and hoped, the KPG returned to the peninsula and established a fully domestic Korean government.

On 15 August, Abe instead offered the position to Lyuh Woon-hyung, who accepted it, to the chagrin of Song. That day, Lyuh announced to the public that Japan had accepted the terms of surrender laid out in the Potsdam Declaration, to the jubilation of the Koreans and the horror of the around 777,000 Japanese residents of the peninsula. With a budget of 20,000,000 yen from the colonial government, Lyuh set about organizing the Committee for the Preparation of Korean Independence (CPKI). The CPKI began taking over the security situation in the city and coordinating with local governments throughout the peninsula. However, the organization ended up being composed of mostly leftists, which infuriated Song even more. Lyuh attempted on multiple occasions to convince Song to join or support the CPKI, but their meetings reportedly ended in angry arguments each time.

For the weeks before the American arrival in Seoul on 8 September, the capital was awash with waves of rumors, some of which may have been spread by Japanese soldiers to distract the public while they prepared to leave the peninsula. On multiple occasions, rumors that Soviet soldiers were about to arrive via rail to Seoul caused either mass panic or, for some left-leaning Koreans, celebration. Even the Soviet Ambassador in Seoul was confused and phoned around to check whether Soviet soldiers were coming. Another rumor, spread both by fliers and a pirate radio broadcast, alleged the creation of a "Dongjin Republic" (동진공화국; 東震共和國), with Syngman Rhee as president, Kim Ku as prime minister, and Lyuh as foreign minister.

On 16 August, young officers of the Japanese military in Seoul fiercely protested the decisions of the colonial government. Despite assurances from the colonial government to the CPKI of minimal interference from the Japanese in their affairs, the military declared that they would firmly punish any unrest, to the protest of the CPKI.

On 6 September, a congress of representatives was convened in Seoul and founded the short-lived People's Republic of Korea (PRK). In the spirit of consensus, conservative elder statesman Syngman Rhee, who was living in exile in the U.S., was nominated as president. Song announced his own National Foundation Preparation Committee (NFPC) on 7 September to directly counter the PRK. However, the NFPC had a minimal role in Korean politics and ended up aligning itself with the KPG after its return.

On 9 September, the formal surrender ceremony of Japanese forces in Korea took place in the throne room of the Japanese General Government Building in Seoul. The Japanese Instrument of Surrender in Korea was signed by senior Japanese commanders of the ground, air, and naval forces, as well as the Governor-General of Korea, Nobuyuki Abe. U.S. Army Major General John R. Hodge and U.S. Navy Admiral Thomas C. Kinkaid accepted the surrender on behalf of the Allied powers.

== Post–World War II ==
=== Division (since 2 September 1945) ===
==== Soviet occupation of northern Korea ====
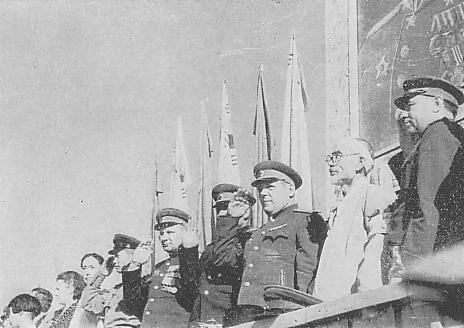
Welcome celebration for the Red Army in Pyongyang on 14 October 1945

The Soviets received little resistance from the Japanese during their advance across northern Korea and were aided by various Korean groups. When Soviet troops entered Pyongyang on August 24, they found a local branch of the Committee for the Preparation of Korean Independence operating under the leadership of veteran nationalist Cho Man-sik. The Soviet Army allowed these "People's Committees" (which were of varying political composition) to function. In September 1945, the Soviet administration issued its own currency, the "Red Army won".

As a result of the destruction caused to the Soviet Union during the Second World War, the Soviets lacked the resources and will to create a full satellite state in Korea and Koreans enjoyed a higher level of autonomy than Soviet-controlled Eastern European states. The Soviets had brought with them a number of Koreans who had been living in the Soviet Union, some of whom were members of the Soviet Communist Party, with the intention of creating a socialist state. Unlike in the south, the former Japanese occupying authorities offered virtually no assistance to the Soviets, and even destroyed factories, mines and official records.

After the massive loss of troops in Europe, the Soviet army recruited new soldiers, who were badly equipped when they landed in Korea, some even lacking shoes and uniforms. During the Soviet occupation, they lived off the Korean land, and looted Japanese colonials and Korean capitalists, sending part of the loot back home. In addition to looting, Soviet soldiers were accused of rape, although the accusations were inflated in the south by fleeing Japanese colonials. Korean peasants sometimes joined the looting, indicating that the looting was based in class disparities, rather than racial disparities. These abuses lessened after the arrival of military police in January 1946.

The Soviets first introduced Kim Il Sung to the public in October 1945 and officially chose Kim as the leader of northern Korea in December 1945, when Kim was installed as the First Secretary of the North Korean Branch Bureau of the Communist Party of Korea. In 1946, Colonel-General Terentii Shtykov took charge of the administration and began to lobby the Soviet government for funds to support the ailing economy. Shtykov's strong support of Kim Il Sung, who had spent the last years of the war training with Soviet troops in Manchuria, was decisive in his rise to power. In February 1946 a provisional government called the Provisional People's Committee of North Korea was formed under Kim Il Sung. Conflicts and power struggles ensued at the top levels of government in Pyongyang as different aspirants manoeuvred to gain positions of power in the new government.

In December 1946, Shtykov and two other generals designed the election results of the Assembly for the Provisional Committee without any Korean input. The generals decided "exact distribution of seats among the parties, the number of women members, and, more broadly, the precise social composition of the legislature." The original 1948 North Korean constitution was primarily written by Stalin and Shtykov.

In March 1946 the provisional government instituted a sweeping land-reform program: land belonging to Japanese and collaborator landowners was divided and redistributed to poor farmers. Organizing the many poor civilians and agricultural labourers under the people's committees, a nationwide mass campaign broke the control of the old landed classes. Landlords were allowed to keep only the same amount of land as poor civilians who had once rented their land, thereby making for a far more equal distribution of land. The North Korean land reform was achieved in a less violent way than in China or in Vietnam. Official American sources stated: "From all accounts, the former village leaders were eliminated as a political force without resort to bloodshed, but extreme care was taken to preclude their return to power." The farmers responded positively; many collaborators, former landowners and Christians fled to the south, where some of them obtained positions in the new South Korean government. According to the U.S. military government, 400,000 northern Koreans went south as refugees.

Key industries were nationalized. The economic situation was nearly as difficult in the north as it was in the south, as the Japanese had concentrated agriculture and service industries in the south and heavy industry in the north.

Soviet forces were withdrawn on 10 December 1948.

==== US occupation of southern Korea ====
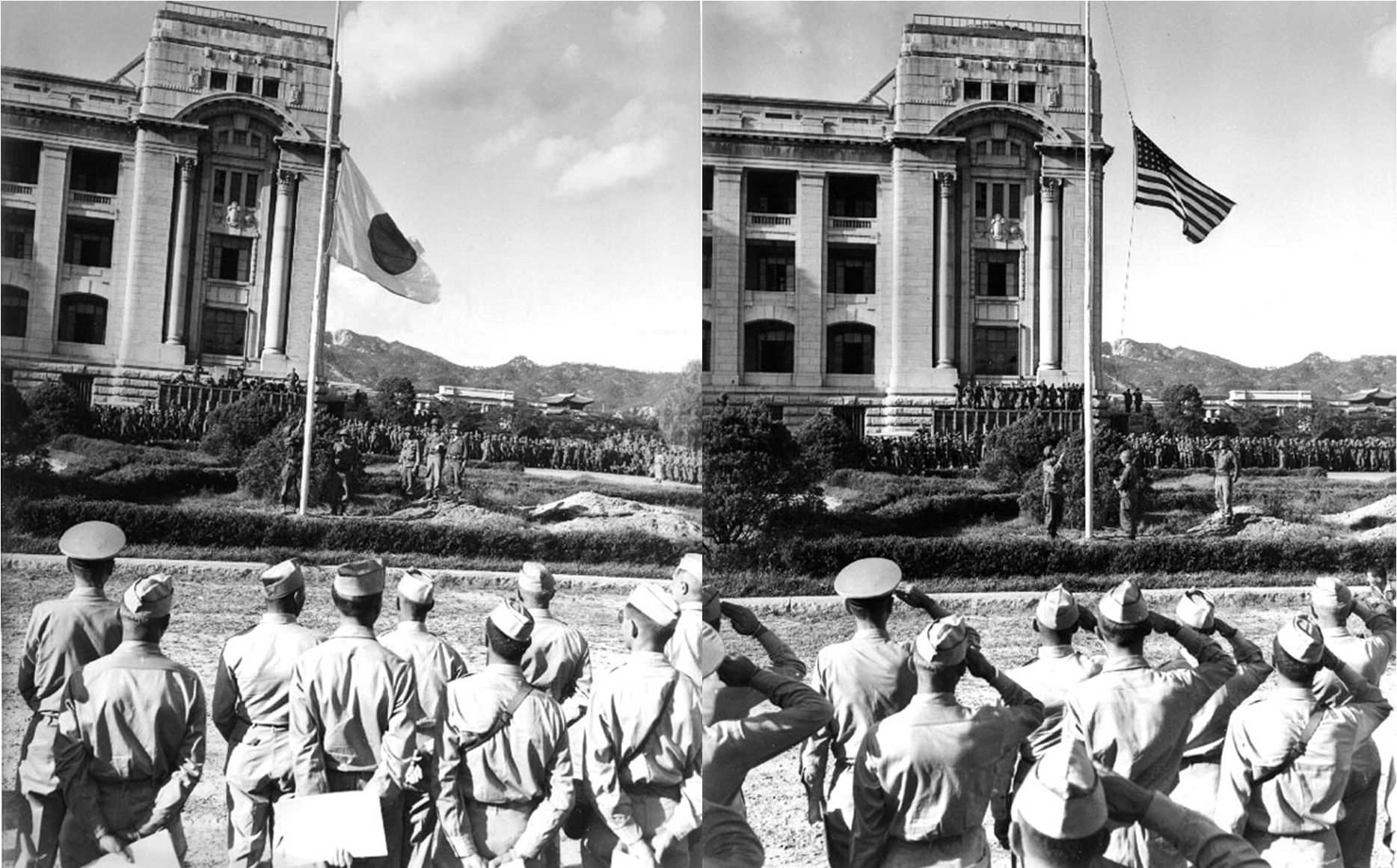
Japanese flag being taken down and replaced with the flag of the United States at the Japanese General Government Building, Seoul on 9 September 1945

With the American government fearing Soviet expansion, and the Japanese authorities in Korea warning of a power vacuum, the embarkation date of the US occupation force was brought forward three times. On 7 September 1945, General Douglas MacArthur issued Proclamation No. 1 to the people of Korea, announcing U.S. military control over Korea south of the 38th parallel and establishing English as the official language during military control. That same day, he announced that Lieutenant General John R. Hodge was to administer Korean affairs. Hodge landed in Incheon with his troops on 8 September 1945, marking the beginning of the United States Army Military Government in Korea (USAMGIK). American soldiers committed rape and looting, on a smaller scale than the Soviets. The racism amongst Americans against Koreans was widespread.

MacArthur as Supreme Commander for the Allied Powers ended up being in charge of southern Korea from 1945 to 1948 due to the lack of clear orders or initiative from Washington, D.C. There was no plan or guideline given to MacArthur from the Joint Chiefs of Staff or the State Department on how to rule Korea. Hodge directly reported to MacArthur and GHQ (General Headquarters) in Tokyo, not to Washington, D.C., during the military occupation. The three year period of the U.S. Army occupation was chaotic and tumultuous compared to the very peaceful and stable U.S. occupation of Japan from 1945 to 1952. Hodge and his XXIV Corps were trained for combat, not for diplomacy and negotiating with the many diverse political groups that emerged in post-colonial southern Korea: former Japanese collaborators, pro-Soviet communists, anti-Soviet communists, right wing groups, and Korean nationalists. None of the Americans in the military or the State Department in the Far East in late 1945 even spoke Korean, leading to jokes among Koreans that Korean translators were really running southern Korea. The Provisional Government of the Republic of Korea, which had operated from China, sent a delegation with three interpreters to Hodge, but he refused to meet with them. Likewise, Hodge refused to recognize the newly formed People's Republic of Korea and its People's Committees, and outlawed it on 12 December.

Japanese civilians were repatriated, including nearly all industrial managers and technicians; over 500,000 by December 1945 and 786,000 by August 1946. Severe price inflation occurred in the disrupted economy, until in summer 1946 rationing and price controls were imposed.

In September 1946, thousands of laborers and peasants rose up against the military government. This uprising was quickly defeated, and failed to prevent scheduled October elections for the South Korean Interim Legislative Assembly. The opening of the Assembly was delayed to December to investigate widespread allegations of electoral fraud.

Ardent anti-communist Syngman Rhee, who had been the first president of the Provisional Government and later worked as a pro-Korean lobbyist in the US, became the most prominent politician in the South. Rhee pressured the American government to abandon negotiations for a trusteeship and create an independent Republic of Korea in the south.

USAMGIK and later the newly formed South Korean government faced a number of left-wing insurgencies, some supported by North Korea, that were eventually suppressed. Over the course of the next few years, between 30,000 and 100,000 people were killed. Most casualties resulted from the Jeju uprising.

=== US–Soviet Joint Commission ===
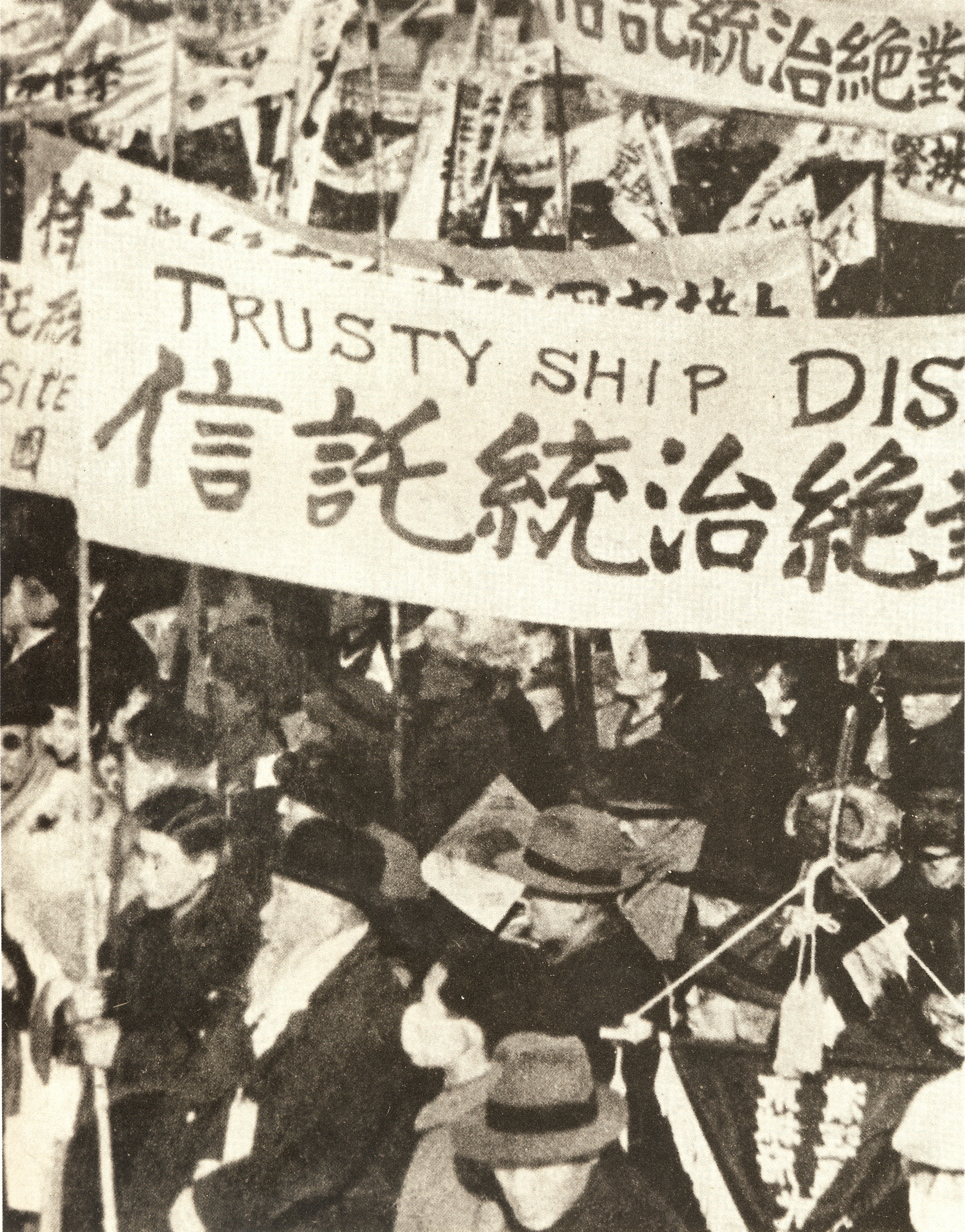
Anti-trusteeship Movement protests in the South (December 1945)

In December 1945, at the Moscow Conference, the Allies agreed that the Soviet Union, the US, the Republic of China, and Britain would take part in a trusteeship over Korea for up to five years in the lead-up to independence. This invigorated the Anti-trusteeship Movement, which demanded the immediate independence of the peninsula. However, the Korean Communist Party, which was closely aligned with the Soviet Communist party, supported the trusteeship. According to historian Fyodor Tertitskiy, documentation from 1945 suggests the Soviet government initially had no plans for a permanent division.

A Soviet-US Joint Commission met in 1946 and 1947 to work towards a unified administration, but failed to make progress due to increasing Cold War antagonism and to Korean opposition to the trusteeship. In 1946, the Soviet Union proposed Lyuh Woon-hyung as the leader of a unified Korea, but this was rejected by the US. On 19 July 1947, Lyuh, the last senior politician committed to left-right dialogue, was assassinated by a 19-year-old man named Han Chigeun, a recent refugee from North Korea and an active member of the nationalist right-wing group, the White Shirts Society.

Meanwhile, the division between the two zones deepened. The difference in policy between the occupying powers led to a polarization of politics, and a transfer of population between North and South. In May 1946 it was made illegal to cross the 38th parallel without a permit. At the final meeting of the Joint Commission in September 1947, Soviet delegate Terentii Shtykov proposed that both Soviet and US troops withdraw and give the Korean people the opportunity to form their own government. This was rejected by the US.

=== UN intervention and the formation of separate governments ===
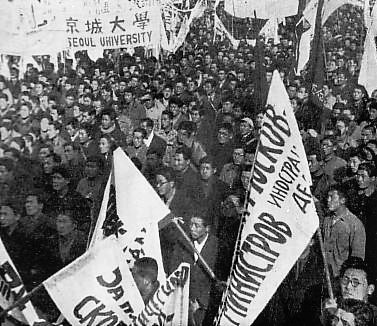
South Korean demonstration in support of the U.S.-Soviet Joint Commission in 1946

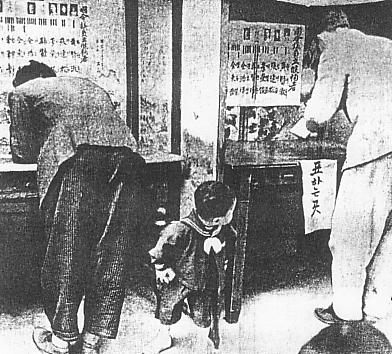
South Korean general election on 10 May 1948

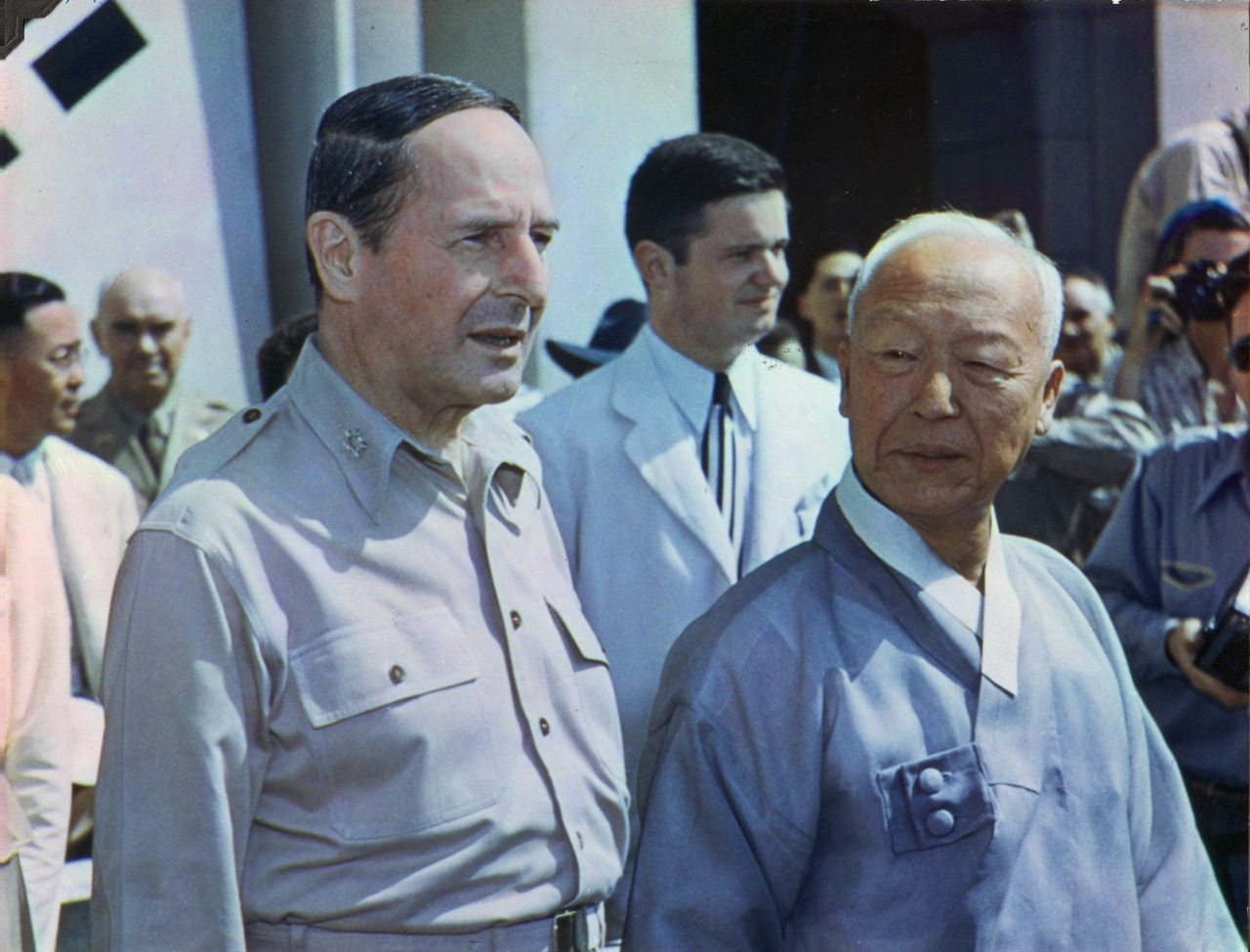
General MacArthur at the handover ceremony from SCAP to President Syngman Rhee on 15 August 1948

With the failure of the Joint Commission to make progress, the US brought the problem before the United Nations in September 1947. The Soviet Union opposed UN involvement. The UN passed a resolution on 14 November 1947, declaring that free elections should be held, foreign troops should be withdrawn, and a UN commission for Korea, the United Nations Temporary Commission on Korea (UNTCOK), should be created. The Soviet Union boycotted the voting and did not consider the resolution to be binding, arguing that the UN could not guarantee fair elections. In the absence of Soviet co-operation, it was decided to hold UN-supervised elections in the south only. This was in defiance of the report of the chairman of the commission, K. P. S. Menon, who had argued against a separate election. Some UNTCOK delegates felt that the conditions in the south gave unfair advantage to right-wing candidates, but they were overruled.

The decision to proceed with separate elections was unpopular among many Koreans, who rightly saw it as a prelude to a permanent division of the country. General strikes in protest against the decision began in February 1948. In April, Jeju islanders rose up against the looming division of the country and full-scale rebellion developed. South Korean troops were sent to repress the rebellion. The repression of the uprising escalated from August 1948, following South Korean independence. The rebellion was largely defeated by May 1949 and 25,000 to 30,000 people had been killed in the conflict, and 70% of the villages were burned by the South Korean troops. The uprising flared up again with the outbreak of the Korean War.

In April 1948, a conference of organizations from the north and the south met in Pyongyang. The southern politicians Kim Koo and Kim Kyu-sik attended the conference and boycotted the elections in the south, as did other politicians and parties. The conference called for a united government and the withdrawal of foreign troops. Syngman Rhee and General Hodge denounced the conference. Kim Koo was assassinated the following year.

On 10 May 1948 the south held a general election. It took place amid widespread violence and intimidation, as well as a boycott by opponents of Syngman Rhee. In response, the All-Union Communist Party (Bolsheviks) Politburo instructed Shtykov to implement the Constitution of North Korea, which the People's Assembly voted to do so on 10 July, establishing the Democratic People's Republic of Korea (Chosŏn Minjujuŭi Inmin Konghwaguk). The legislative elections then took place on 25 August with Kim Il Sung appointed as prime minister on 9 September. In the South, on 15 August, the Republic of Korea (Daehan Minguk) formally declared its statehood and took over power from the U.S. military, with Syngman Rhee as the first president. USAMGIK was formally dissolved and the Korean Military Advisory Group was formed to train and provide support for the South Korean army. U.S. forces started to withdraw in a process that was completed by 1949.

On 12 December 1948, the United Nations General Assembly accepted the report of UNTCOK and declared the Republic of Korea to be the "only lawful government in Korea". However, none of the members of UNTCOK considered that the election had established a legitimate national parliament. The Australian government, which had a representative on the commission declared that it was "far from satisfied" with the election.

Unrest continued in the South. In October 1948, the Yeosu–Suncheon rebellion took place, in which some regiments rejected the suppression of the Jeju uprising and rebelled against the government. In 1949, the Syngman Rhee government established the Bodo League in order to keep an eye on its political opponents. The majority of the Bodo League's members were innocent farmers and civilians who were forced into membership. The registered members or their families were executed at the beginning of the Korean War. On 24 December 1949, South Korean Army massacred Mungyeong citizens who were suspected communist sympathizers or their family and affixed blame to communists.

== Korean War ==
This division of Korea, after more than a millennium of being unified, was seen as controversial and temporary by both regimes. From 1948 until the start of the civil war in June 1950, the armed forces of both sides engaged in a series of bloody skirmishes along the border. On 25 June 1950, North Korean forces invaded South Korea, triggering the Korean War. The United Nations intervened to protect the South, sending a US-led force. As it occupied the south, the Democratic People's Republic of Korea attempted to unify Korea under its communist regime, initiating the nationalisation of industry, land reform, and the restoration of the People's Committees.

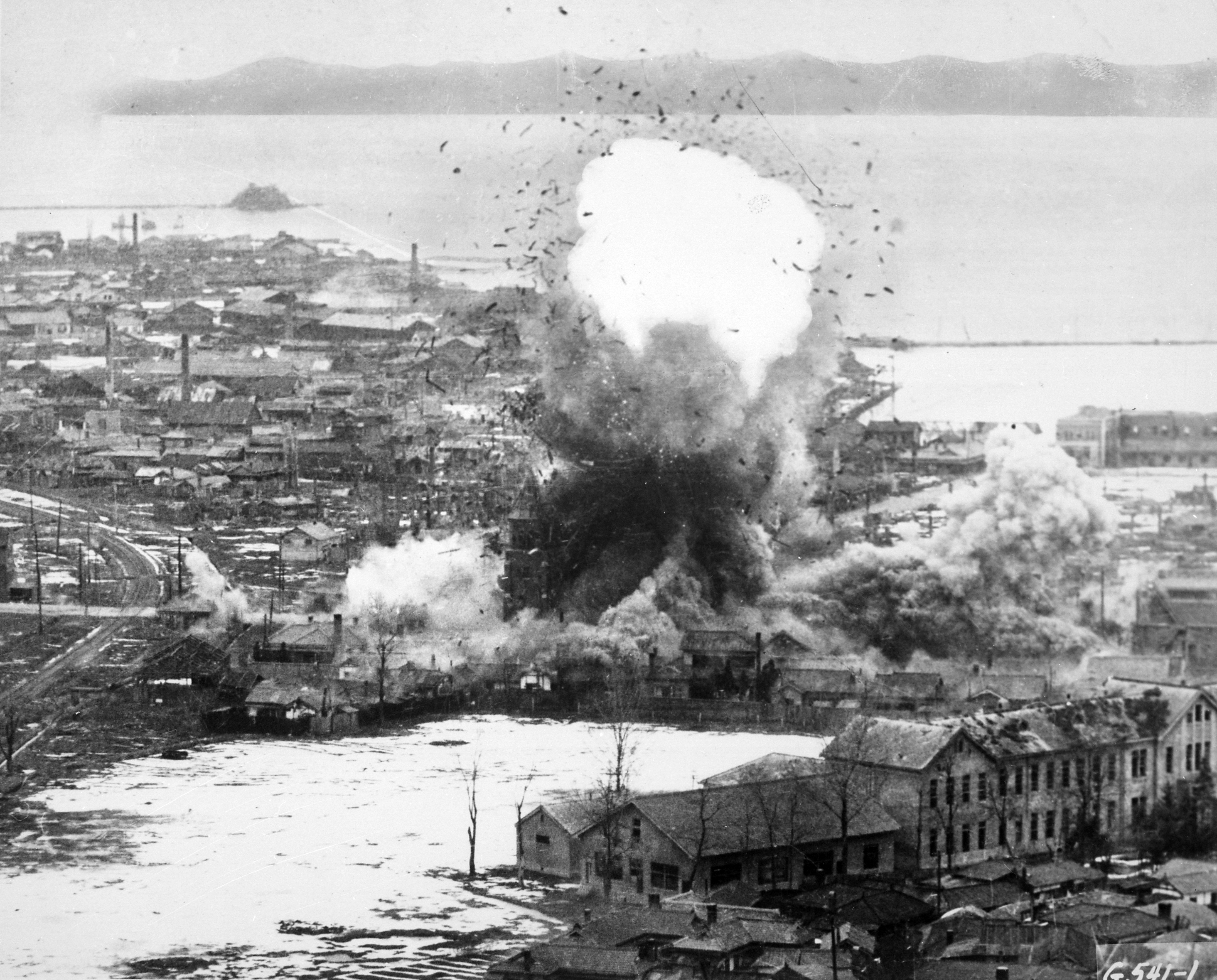
U.S. planes bombing Wonsan, North Korea, 1951

While UN intervention was conceived as restoring the border at the 38th parallel, Syngman Rhee argued that the attack of the North had obliterated the boundary. Similarly UN Commander in Chief, General Douglas MacArthur stated that he intended to unify Korea, not just drive the North Korean forces back behind the border. However, the North overran 90% of the south until a counter-attack by US-led forces. As the North Korean forces were driven from the south, South Korean forces crossed the 38th parallel on 1 October, and American and other UN forces followed a week later. This was despite warnings from the communist People's Republic of China that it would intervene if American troops crossed the parallel. As it occupied the north, the Republic of Korea, in turn, attempted to unify the country under its regime, with the Korean National Police enforcing political indoctrination. As US-led forces pushed into the north near the Yalu River, China unleashed a counter-attack in October 1950 which drove them back into the south.

In 1951, the front line stabilized near the 38th parallel, and both sides began to consider an armistice. Rhee, however, demanded the war continue until Korea was unified under his leadership. The Communist side supported an armistice line being based on the 38th parallel, but the United Nations supported a line based on the territory held by each side, which was militarily defensible. The UN position, formulated by the Americans, went against the consensus leading up to the negotiations. Initially, the Americans proposed a line that passed through Pyongyang, far to the north of the front line. The Chinese and North Koreans eventually agreed to a border on the military line of contact rather than the 38th parallel, but this disagreement led to a tortuous and drawn-out negotiating process.

== Armistice ==
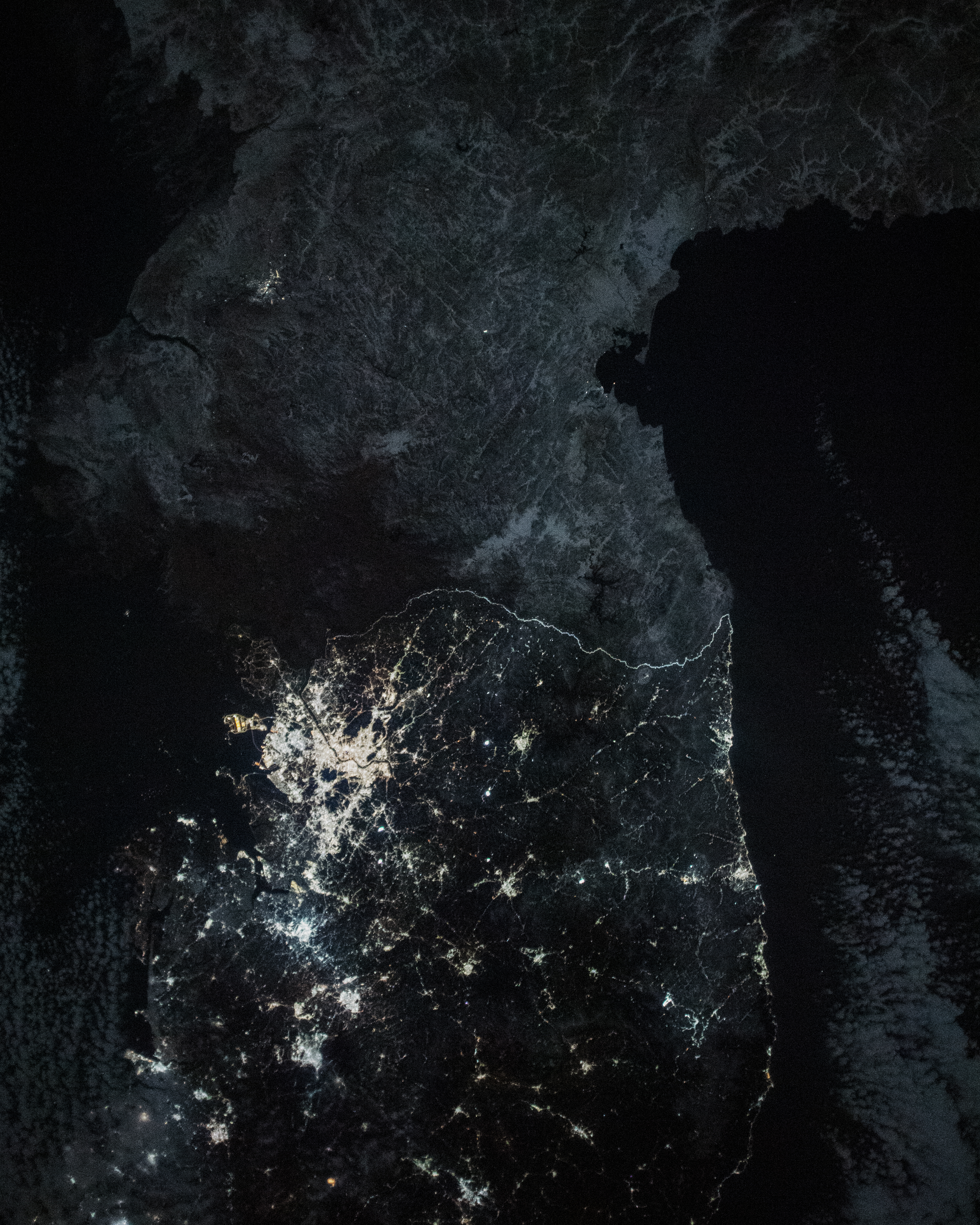
The division in 2024 is clearly visible from space with a higher amount of light emitted into space from the South than the North

The Korean Armistice Agreement was signed after three years of war. The two sides agreed to create a 4-kilometre-wide (2.5-mile) buffer zone between the states, known as the Korean Demilitarized Zone (DMZ). This new border, reflecting the territory held by each side at the end of the war, crossed the 38th parallel diagonally. Rhee refused to accept the armistice and continued to urge the reunification of the country by force. Despite attempts by both sides to reunify the country, the war perpetuated the division of Korea and led to a permanent alliance between South Korea and the U.S., and a permanent U.S. garrison forces in the South.

As dictated by the terms of the Korean Armistice, a Geneva Conference was held in 1954 on the Korean question. Despite efforts by many of the nations involved, the conference ended without a declaration for a unified Korea.

The Armistice established a Neutral Nations Supervisory Commission (NNSC) which was tasked to monitor the Armistice. Since 1953, members of the Swiss and Swedish armed forces have been members of the NNSC stationed near the DMZ. Poland and Czechoslovakia were the neutral nations chosen by North Korea, but North Korea expelled their observers after those countries embraced capitalism.

== Post-armistice relations ==
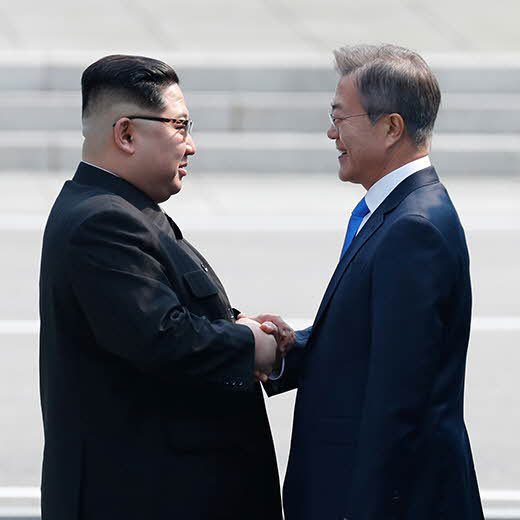
Moon and Kim shaking hands over the demarcation line

Since the war, Korea has remained divided along the DMZ. North and South have remained in a state of conflict, with the opposing regimes both claiming to be the legitimate government of the whole country. Sporadic negotiations have failed to produce lasting progress towards reunification.

On 27 April 2018 North Korean leader Kim Jong Un and South Korean President Moon Jae-in met in the Demilitarized Zone (DMZ). The Panmunjom Declaration signed by both leaders called for the end of longstanding military activities near the border and the reunification of Korea.

On 1 November 2018, buffer zones were established across the DMZ to help ensure the end of hostility on land, sea and air. The buffer zones stretch from the north of Deokjeok Island to the south of Cho Island in the West Sea and the north of Sokcho city and south of Tongchon County in the East (Yellow) Sea. In addition, no fly zones were established.

In October 2024, the North Korean constitution was amended to remove references to reunification and labelled South Korea a "hostile state". This was preceded by the destruction of roads connecting the north to the south in a bid to "completely separate" the two states.

== In popular culture ==
=== Period dramas ===
- Eyes of Dawn (1991–1992 MBC television series)
- Rustic Period (2002–2003 SBS television series)
- Seoul 1945 (2006 KBS1 television series)
- Crash Landing On You (2019 tvN television series)

== See also ==
- List of border incidents involving North and South Korea
- Korean conflict
- Korean reunification
- North Korea–South Korea relations
- History of North Korea
- History of South Korea
- Partition of Vietnam
- Trizone, the collective name for the American, British, and French occupation zones in Germany
- Soviet occupation zone in Germany
