= Committee for the Preparation of Korean Independence =

1945 organization in South Korea

Flag of the CPKI

The Committee for the Preparation of Korean Independence (Korean: 조선건국준비위원회; Hanja: 朝鮮建國準備委員會) was an organization centered around figures such as Lyuh Woon-hyung, created for the purpose of taking over executive authority from the Governor-General of Chōsen during the Allied Military Government from 15 August to 7 September 1945. Its abbreviated name is the “Preparatory Committee,” and its headquarters were located in Gye-dong, Seoul.

== Overview ==
On the evening of 15 August 1945, Lyuh Woon-hyung established the Committee for the Preparation of Korean Independence (Preparatory Committee), based on the National Establishment Alliance that he had formed a year prior in August 1944. Lyuh Woon-hyung assumed the position of Committee Chairperson, with Ahn Chai-hong serving as Vice-Chairperson, Jeong Baek serving as Organization Chief, Choi Geun-u serving as Chief of General Affairs, Lee Gyu-gap serving as Chief of Financial Affairs, Jo Dong-ho serving as Chief of Publicity, and Kwon Tae-seok serving as Chief of Enforcement. Incidentally, the one who first proposed the name, “Committee for the Preparation of Korean Independence,” was Ahn Chai-hong.

The mission statement of the Preparatory Committee included the following three points:

1. “We resolve to establish a completely independent nation.”
2. “We resolve to found a democratic administration capable of realizing the basic political and social demands of all ethnic groups.”
3. “We resolve to independently maintain domestic order and secure the livelihood of the masses throughout this temporary transitional period.”

At the time of its establishment, Lyuh Woon-hyung’s younger brother, Lyuh Woon-hong, described the organization as composed of: “The extreme left of Communist Party members; non-communist leftists, or moderate socialists; right-wingers such as Ahn Chai-hong and Lee Gyu-gap; and figures such as Jang Gwon and Song Gyu-hwan, who unconditionally support Lyuh Woon-hyung as an elder brother figure.”

On 4 September 1945, a plenary session was held, and there was a reorganization of the executive committee, including the appointment of lawyer Ho Hon as vice chairperson. On the evening of 6 September, the Preparatory Committee gathered in a lecture hall at Kyunggi Girls’ High School with over 1000 people in attendance, and after the withdrawal of Ahn Chai-hong and the nationalist faction, the communist and socialist wings seized control and declared the establishment of the People’s Republic of Korea. The Preparatory Committee became that governmental organization (the People’s Committees), and on 7 October was subsequently dissolved into the People’s Republic Executive Committee.
