= People's Committee (postwar Korea) =

Form of local self-government in postwar Korea

Flag of the People's Committee of Korea

The People's Committees (Korean: 인민위원회; Hanja: 人民委員會) were a type of largely local committee-government which appeared throughout Korea immediately following the conclusion of the Second World War. These committees existed in their original form from August 1945 to early 1946 and were the political basis for the People's Republic of Korea. By 1948, these participatory grassroots organs of self-government became centralized in the north and purged in the south.

== Formation and objectives ==
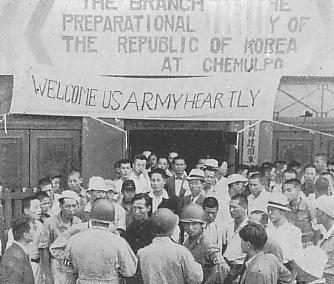
Political Group in Incheon in 1945

Immediately following the close of the Pacific War, the rapid advance of Soviet troops coupled with an equally rapid retreat from the peninsula by the Japanese colonial forces, left most of Korea with functionally no government. To restore order in the power vacuum as well as to remedy historical grievances, many Korean cities and towns organized their own government counsels. These counsels which were formed throughout the country at first went by different names including 'Committees Preparing for the Restoration of Statehood' and 'National Administration Committees'. By September 1945, however, they were universally called 'People's Political Committees' (inmin chŏngch'i wiwŏnhoe) and then by October they came to be called 'People's Committees'. These Counsels, some electorally determined, some not, featured local notables and community leaders. As much as these People's Committees were unified by their ad hoc characteristics, they varied widely in their specifics by their locality. The People's Committees were not a single, national movement, and therefore there is no single blueprint by which they can be examined. However, the committees in general shared some characteristics. Most of the committees attempted to remove Japanese or Pro-Japanese collaborators from positions of authority. These committees supported workers and peasants, who were collectively deciding on matters related to their work and living conditions. Most people's committees were concerned with the local issues of maintaining order after liberation and protecting food supplies. Most People's committees also attempted some degree of land reform and land redistribution. They seized large land holdings and distributed them to tenants or small holding farmers. The success of the PCs in pursuing these political projects varied widely depending on where the committees were in Korea.

Most of these committees had sections for propaganda, peacekeeping and security, food, finances, welfare relief, consumer affairs, labor relations, tenancy rates, among others. They also set up people's courts to punish Korean collaborators with the Empire of Japan as "national traitors".

== Scale and distribution ==
The People's Committees were widely distributed in post-liberation Korea. They could be found throughout all of the major provinces and varied widely in their size and influence based on the community of their inception. Committees in small towns were concerned with only local issues whereas more metropolitan committees could have regional or national ambitions. Seoul (CPKI) and Pyongyang People's Committees, for instance, had nationwide influence or formed the seed of the formation of a lasting government in the North respectively. In contrast, the smaller committees were focused almost solely on local issues and politics which were relevant to the countryside. Despite its lower population, the People's Committees were disproportionately powerful in the north of the Country. This was especially so in the Northeast Hamgyŏng provinces which had a long history of small-holding farmers and local autonomy. This was particularly prevalent in North Hamgyŏng Province where more than fifty percent of the peasants were owner-cultivators. Therefore, in the North, the social conditions were much better adapted for the empowerment and survival of popular government groups.

People's Committees in Korea (November 1945)
	Total North and South	South of 38th Parallel	North of 38th Parallel
Township (myŏn)	2,244	1,667 (no PC in 13 townships)	564
Village (ŭp)	103	75	28
Island	2	2	0
County (kun)	218	148	70
City	21	12	9
Province	14	7	7

== Committees in the North ==
People's Committees North of the 38th parallel were proportionally more numerous and more powerful than their counterparts in the south. The demographics of the North featured many more small holding farmers and landlords whose patrimonies where much smaller than their southern equivalents. This meant that the residents of the North were more receptive than those in the south to societal and land reorganization. Indeed, most PCs in the North were able to begin and complete land redistribution before the Soviets ever arrived. This contrasts sharply with the South where land redistribution would remain an important issue for at least the rest of the 1940s. A "land-to-the-tiller" program was officially promulgated on 5 March 1946, formalizing many of the ad hoc confiscations.

In June 1946, a Labor Law was instituted calling for an eight hour work day, standardized wage scale, paid annual vacation, collective bargaining rights, and elimination of child labor in hazardous industries. The July 1946 Law of Equal Rights for Men and Women provided equal rights to political participation, economic opportunities, educational opportunities, freedom of choice in marriage, freedom of choice in divorce, and outlawed polygamy and the sale of women as wives or concubines. Major industries, banks, and transportation (many of which had been owned by Japanese occupiers) were nationalized.

The northern committees had a fundamentally different relationship from the southern with both their occupation authorities and their Korean state. The Soviet Occupation forces recognized the PCs and initially tried to work with them. Cho Mansik, a conservative Christian nationalist, was the leader of the South P'yŏngan Committee. This was the most important People's Committee in the North of Korea and in the days after liberation he was the most popular and powerful political figure in the North. The Soviets attempted to work with Cho, but in December 1945, at the Moscow Conference, the Soviet Union agreed to a US proposal for a trusteeship over Korea for up to five years. There was widespread opposition across the political spectrum of Korean society towards the partition, and nearly all leftist and conservative nationalists including Cho as well as Kim Gu openly denounced the partition. However, pro-US conservatives under Rhee Syngman and pro-Soviet communists under Kim Il Sung, caved into pressure from the United States and the Soviet Union respectively. Afterwards, in North Korea, Cho was put under house arrest by Soviet authorities and opponents of the partition were removed from positions of power and replaced with pro-Soviet Koreans.

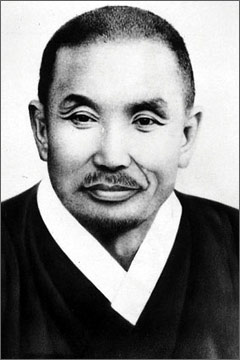
Portrait of Cho Mansik in 1947

Once this was accomplished, the Soviet Occupation forces directly integrated the People's Committees into the nascent DPRK. They did this by creating the Provisional People's Committee for North Korea (PPCNK) in February 1946. The PPCNK would be a counsel of all of the PCs throughout the northern provinces and would form the nucleus of the future DPRK. However, this was not a legitimization of the power of the PCs. The People's Committees, once brought under heel by the Soviet occupation forces, were lumped into the state apparatus after being purged of potential reactionaries and subjected to Stalinist style one-candidate elections. The completion of this process by early 1946 is illustrated by the fact that PCs were being used as apparatuses for seizing tax in kind. Since such taxes were one of the most hated aspects of the colonial administration, the trappings of which the PCs tried to erase, this activity on the part of the People's Committees would represent complete loss of popular control. Thereafter, their appearance of populist action and democratic involvement was important in maintaining the electoral facade in the early Democratic People's Republic of Korea, but had little further effect on the state of North Korea.

=== Orientation ===
Political committees had varying political orientations with many having coalitions between moderate or conservative democrats and communists, not only because of Soviet pressure but also because of the pragmatic need to work within a broad coalition. Pyongyang was known as the "Jerusalem of the East" due to having some of the highest concentration of Christians in East Asia, and so Christian groups had considerable influence. However, many Christian Korean nationalists had embraced socialism for the future of Korea as a result of participation in anti-imperialist movements during the colonial period. The USSR would assist left-wing and Soviet-friendly political figures in committees where they were lacking, leading to a leftward shift in the committee composition of the more conservative Hwanghae and South Pyongan provinces.

Overview of provincial People's Committees in North Korea, 1945
Province	Political Orientation	Notes
North Hamgyong	Leftist stronghold, communists take control by 26 October	Active Red Peasant Union during colonial period
South Hamgyong	Leftist stronghold	Largest concentration of industrial workers since colonial period
North Pyongan	Left-Right coalition	Largest number of tenant conflicts during colonial period; stronghold of New People's Party
South Pyongan	Conservative, coalition by 27 August, left-wing by 24 November	Large concentration of Christians
Hwanghae	Conservative, coalition by 2 September, left-wing by 13 September	Strongest class conflict, largest agricultural region in the north
Kangwon	Left-wing	

=== Historical significance ===
Although Koreans north of the 38th parallel played a much more active role the formulation of their new country than those to the south, the orientation they were taking their country to was influenced to a great degree by Soviet political interests.

== Committees in the South ==
The Southern Occupation Zone was initially home to perhaps the largest and most significant of the PCs, the Committee for the Preparation of Korean Independence (Chosŏn kŏn'guk chunbi wiwŏnhoe, CPKI). The CPKI was founded by Yŏ Unhyŏng and other nationalists in Seoul. This committee had aspirations of becoming an interim national government for Korea. It had, at its greatest reach, 145 peacekeeping forces (ch'iandae) spreading its influence throughout the country. These ch'iandae were not closely controlled by the center. They quickly prioritized local issues such as maintaining access to food and keeping order in the regions to which they were assigned. They did not maintain control by the central CPKI authorities and were gradually integrated into the provincial PCs. The CPKI itself would cease to exist under pressure from the occupation authorities soon thereafter.

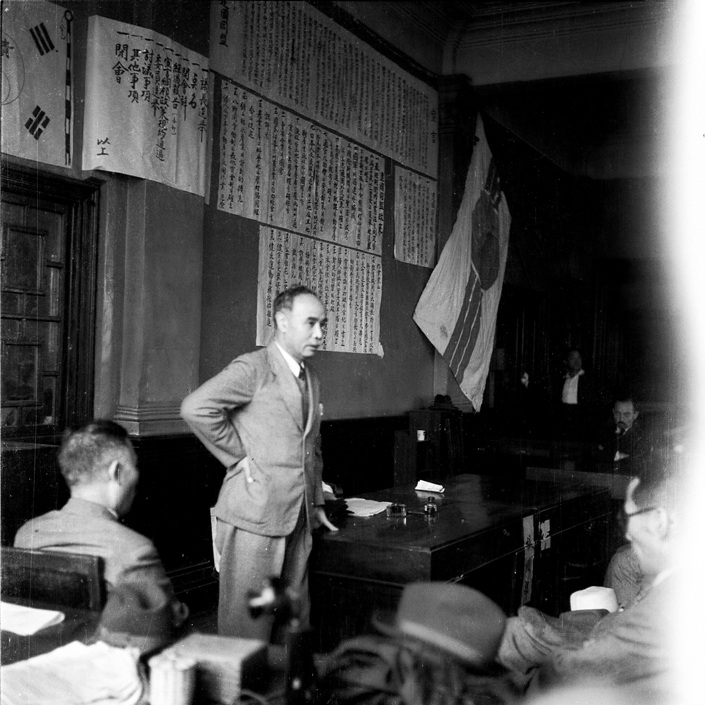
CPKI meeting 16 Oct. 1945

The People's Committees south of the 38th Parallel in 1945 found themselves abutting the fiercely anti-communist American occupation forces and the nascent Southern System. The American Occupation was alarmed by the apparent red orientation of the PCs within their zone. Fears of communist control of the PCs and the standing policy of not recognizing pre-existing Korean governments led the occupation forces to ban the People's Committees and outlaw them throughout the American Occupation Zone.

=== Orientation ===
The name of the People's Committees sounds Soviet-Affiliated and would have so sounded in 1945. However, the People's Committees in the South were largely controlled by nationalists who were more interested in creating an independent Korea than they were in the political struggles of the emerging Cold War. Leftists were present on many committees but remained a minority until the committees were dissolved.

=== Historical significance ===
In the South, the dissolution of the People's Committees was the beginning of a decades-long struggle on the part of Southern System elites to repress and discredit popular action which they viewed as being pro-communist. The suppression of the PCs therefore helped to establish a precedent of political censorship which would continue, in one form or another, in the South until the democratization movement in the 1980s. The suppression of the PCs also kick-started the violent leftist uprising and the brutal repression which engulfed the South in the years before the Korean War. Therefore, in the South, the legacy of the People's Committees lies in their veterans who either left to the DPRK or stayed south to strengthen the democratization movement which would go on in the ROK for a further four decades.
