= Provisional People's Committee of North Korea =

1946–1947 Soviet-backed government

Provisional People's Committee of North Korea 북조선림시인민위원회 (Korean)
- 1946–1947
- Flag of North Korea Symbol
- Anthem: 애국가; Aegukga "The Patriotic Song"
- Location of northern Korea
- Status: Provisional government under Soviet Civil Administration
- Capital: Pyongyang
- Common languages: Korean
- Religion: None
- Government: Provisional communist government
- Chairman
  - 1946–1947: Kim Il Sung
- History
  - Soviet takeover of People's Committees north of the 38th parallel: 8 February 1946
  - People's Committee of North Korea established: 21 February 1947
- Currency: Korean yen, Won of the Red Army Command
- ISO 3166 code: KP
Preceded by	Succeeded by
People's Republic of Korea; Soviet Civil Administration	People's Committee of North Korea
- Today part of: North Korea; South Korea
- ^aSee Religion in North Korea.

The Provisional People's Committee of North Korea (Korean: 북조선림시인민위원회) was the provisional government of North Korea.

Following the banning of the People's Republic of Korea by the United States military occupational forces in southern Korea in December 1945, the Soviet occupation forces then co-opted the remaining people's committees on 8 February 1946 in response for the need of the communists to have centralization of power in northern Korea, which was then an area divided into provincial people's committees. Regarded as the highest administrative power institution in northern Korea, it also became a de facto provisional government that carried out reforms, such as land reforms and the nationalization of key industries.

The committee was succeeded by the People's Committee of North Korea on 21 February 1947, which became a provisional government as northern Korea transitioned into the Democratic People's Republic of Korea.

== History ==
With the surrender of the Empire of Japan in the World War II in August 1945, people's committees were set up throughout Korea. The administration of these people's committees were recognized by the Soviet forces entering northern Korea, while setting up their own occupation authority known as the Soviet Civil Administration on 3 October 1945.

An early attempt by the Soviets to create a centralized government in northern Korea was the Administrative Committee of Five Provinces. This was established on 8 October 1945 and was headed by the nationalist and South Pyongan people's committee chairman Cho Man-sik, who was the most prominent figure in northern Korea and one of the Soviets' candidates for a future North Korean leader. This committee was a temporary self-governing institution created by representatives of the five provincial people's committees in northern Korea, which consisted of an alliance between communists and nationalists. The Administrative Committee of Five Provinces ended following the arrest of Cho Man-sik by the Soviets in January 1946 due to opposing ideologies between the two and Cho's opposition to the proposal of the Moscow Conference for a trusteeship in Korea.

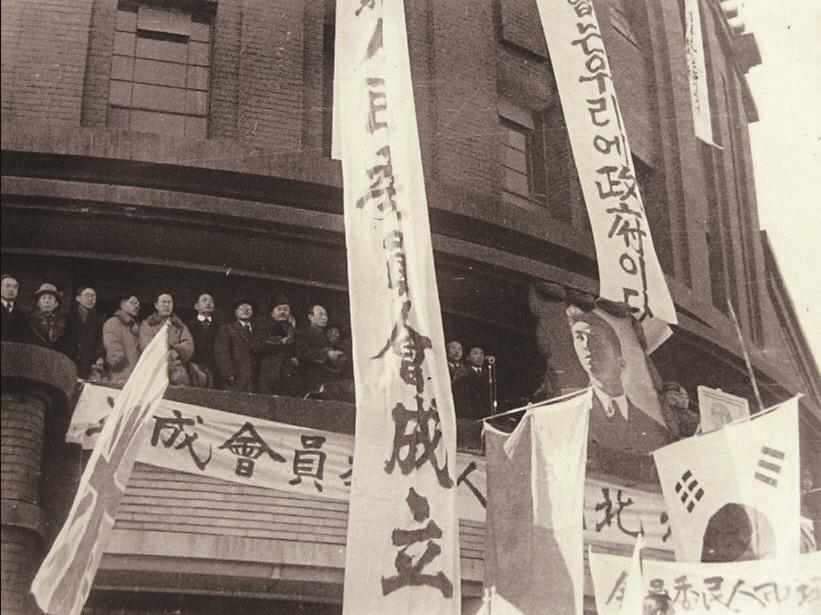
Photo taken upon the establishment of the government (8 February 1946)

On 8–9 February 1946, a meeting of political parties, social organizations, people's committees and administrative bureaus in northern Korea established the Provisional People's Committee of North Korea. This new communist-dominated committee was headed by its chairman Kim Il Sung, a communist being backed by the Soviets to become the North Korean leader. This committee effectively became a de facto provisional government that carried out reforms in northern Korea such as land reforms and nationalization of key industries in accordance to the 20-Point Platform issued by Kim Il Sung in March 1946. The Soviet Civil Administration continued to function concurrently with the Provisional People's Committee of North Korea, but in an advisory role.

The Provisional People's Committee of North Korea held local people's committee elections in November 1946. This was in preparation for the election in February 1947 of the People's Assembly of North Korea, which organized the People's Committee of North Korea on 21 February 1947 that became the succeeding provisional government in northern Korea.

== Organization ==
The Provisional People's Committee of North Korea was organized through the Soviet-organized "Extended Conference of all Political Parties, Social Organisations, Various Administrative Bureaus and Province-, City- and County-Level People’s Committees of North Korea" in northern Korea on 8–9 February 1946, which included political parties, social organizations, administrative bureaus and people's committees.

Participating in the meeting were 137 representatives that included two representatives from the Communist Party of Korea, two representatives from the Democratic Party of Korea, two representatives from the Independence Alliance, two representatives from the General Federation of Labor Unions, two representatives from the General Federation of Peasant Unions, one representative from the Women's League, one representative from the Democratic Youth League, one representative from religious associations, one representative from the Korea-Soviet Cultural Association, 11 administrative bureau heads and representatives from the people's committees.

Kim Il Sung made a report on the political situation in North Korea and the issue of creating a provisional people's committee on the first day of the meeting on 8 February. This was followed on 9 February by the election of the 23 members of the Provisional People's Committee of North Korea, with Kim Il Sung as chairman, Kim Tu-bong as vice chairman and Kang Ryang-uk as secretary general.

Name	Affiliation
Kim Il Sung	Communist Party
Kim Tu-bong	Independence Alliance
Mu Chong	Communist Party
Kang Ryang-uk	Democratic Party
Choe Yong-gon	Democratic Party
Ri Mun-hwan	Independent
Han Hui-jin	Independent
Ri Sun-gun	Communist Party
Ri Pong-su	Communist Party
Han Tong-chan	Independent
Jang Jong-sik	Communist Party
Yun Ki-yong	Democratic Party
Choe Yong-dal	Communist Party
Kim Tok-yong	
Pang U-yong	Independence Alliance
Hong Ki-ju	Democratic Party
Hyon Chan-hyong	General Federation of Labor Unions
Ri Ki-yong	Korea-Soviet Cultural Association
Kang Jin-gon	General Federation of Peasant Unions
Pak Jong-ae	Democratic Women's League
Hong Ki-hwang	Democratic Party
Kang Yong-gun	Labor Union
Pang Su-yong	Democratic Youth League

The Provisional People's Committee of North Korea also consisted of ten departments and three bureaus (which was later increased to four bureaus).

Position	Name	Political party
Chairman	Kim Il Sung	Communist Party
Vice Chairman	Kim Tu-bong	Independence Alliance
Secretary General	Kang Ryang-uk	Democratic Party
Industry Department	Ri Mun-hwan	Independent
Transportation Department	Han Hui-jin	Independent
Agriculture and Forestry Department	Ri Sun-gun	Communist Party
Commerce Department	Han Tong-chan	Independent
Postal Services Department	Jo Yong-yol	Communist Party
Finance Department	Ri Pong-su	Communist Party
Education Department	Jang Jong-sik	Communist Party
Health Department	Yun Ki-yong	Democratic Party
Justice Department	Choe Yong-dal	Communist Party
Security Department	Choe Yong-gon	Democratic Party
Planning Bureau	Jong Jin-tae	Communist Party
Propaganda Bureau	O Ki-sop	Communist Party
General Affairs Bureau	Ri Ju-yon	Communist Party

Han Hui-jin would later be replaced as the head of the transportation department by Ho Nam-hui, and Han Tong-chan being replaced as head of the commerce department by Jang Si-u. O Ki-sop later became the head of the labor department following its creation in September 1946, with Ri Chong-won becoming the new head of the propaganda bureau.

== Reforms ==
On 23 March 1946, Kim Il Sung issued the 20-Point Platform, which became the basis of the reforms to be implemented in northern Korea.

1. Completely purge all remnants of the former Japanese imperialist rule in the political and economic life in Korea.
2. Open a merciless struggle against reactionary and anti-democratic elements within the country, and absolutely prohibit activities by fascist and anti-democratic parties, groups and individuals.
3. Guarantee the freedoms of speech, press, assembly and faith to all people. Guarantee the condition for the free activities of democratic political parties, working associations, peasant associations, and other democratic social organizations.
4. Have the entire Korean people possess the duty and the right to organize people's committees, the unified local administrative institutions, through elections based on a universal, direct, equal and secret ballot.
5. Guarantee equal rights to all citizens regardless of gender, faith and possession of property.
6. Insist on the inviolability of residence and person, and the lawful guarantee of property and personal possessions of citizens.
7. Abolish of all legal and judicial institutions used during the time of the former Japanese imperialist rule and also influenced by it, and elect people's judicial institutions on democratic principles and guarantee of equal rights under the law for all citizens.
8. Develop industries, farms, transportation and commerce for increasing the well-being of the people.
9. Nationalize large enterprises, transport institutions, banks, mines and forests.
10. Allow and encourage freedom in private handicraft and commerce.
11. Confiscate land from Japanese persons, Japanese nationals, traitors, and landowners who practice tenant farming and the scrapping of the tenant farming system, and make all confiscated land into properties of peasants free of charge. Have the state manage all irrigation facilities free of charge.
12. Struggle against speculators and loan sharks by enacting market prices for daily necessities.
13. Enact a single and fair tax system, and implement a progressive income tax system.
14. Implement an 8-hour work system for workers and office clerks, and regulate minimum wages. Prohibit work for males below the age of 13, and implement a 6-hour work system for males aged 13 to 16.
15. Implement life insurance for workers and office clerks, and implement an insurance system for workers and enterprises.
16. Implement a universal compulsory education system, and extensively expand primary schools, middle schools, high schools and universities under state management. Reform the people's education system in accordance to the democratic system of the state.
17. Actively develop the national culture, science and art, and expand the number of theaters, libraries, radio broadcasting stations and movie theaters.
18. Extensively install special schools for cultivating the talent being required in all sectors of state institutions and people's economy.
19. Encourage people and enterprises engaged in science and art, and give aid to them.
20. Expand the number of state hospitals, eradicate infectious diseases, and treat poor people for free.

On 8 March 1946, land reform was implemented in North Korea that saw the confiscation of land from Japanese nationals and organizations, Korean collaborations, landowners and religious organizations. The confiscated land were then redistributed to 420,000 households. A total of 52% of North Korea's land area and 82% of land ownerships were redistributed.

On 24 June 1946, an 8-hour work day was implemented, with workers involved in dangerous work being assigned to a 7-hour work day. Work was prohibited for those who are below the age of 14. Equal pay and social insurance were implemented for workers.

On 22 July 1946, a law on gender equality in North Korea was enacted.

On 10 August 1946, 1,034 major industrial facilities, or 90% of the total industry in North Korea, were nationalized.

On 27 December 1946, it was decided that farmers in North Korea would give 25% of their harvest as agricultural tax.
