= Lyuh Woon-hyung =

Korean politician (1886–1947)

- 여운형
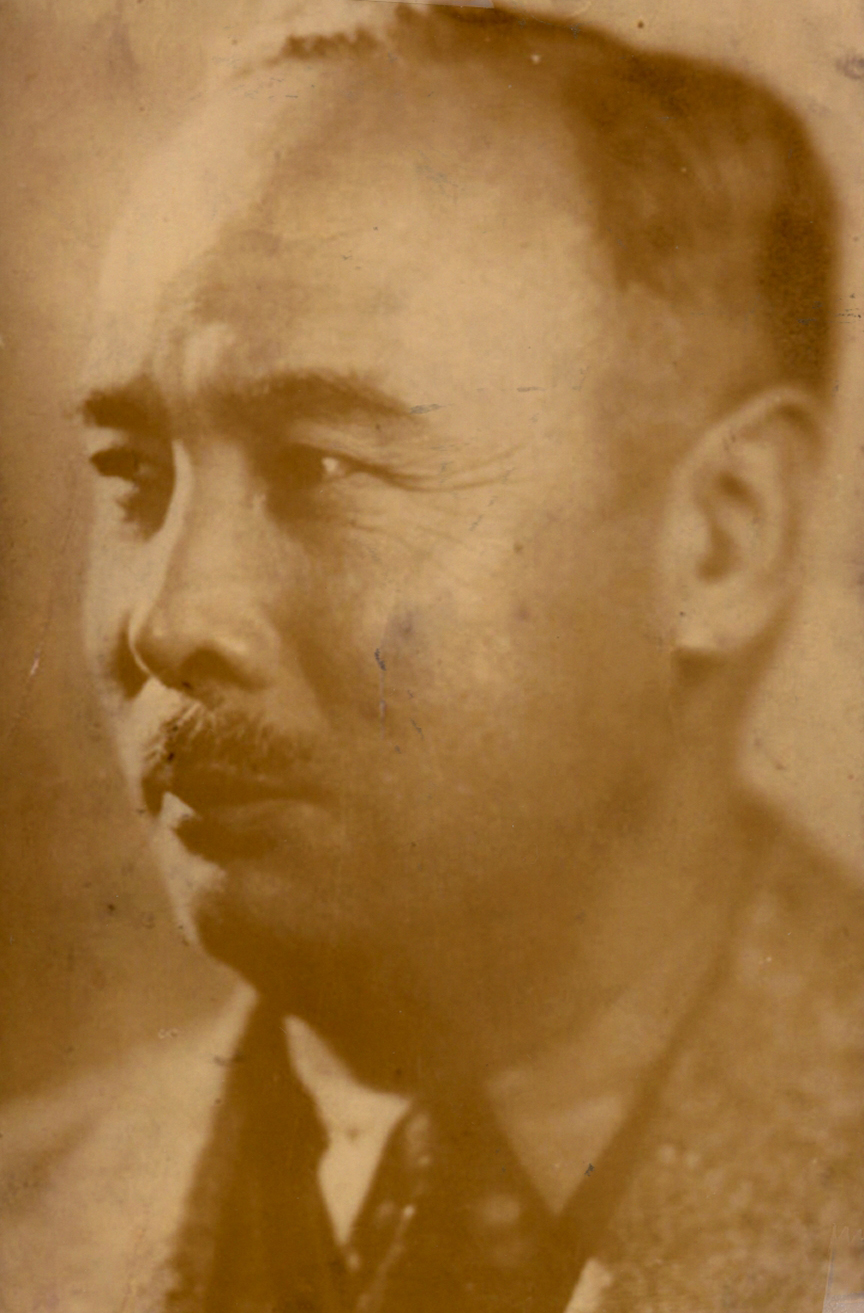
- Lyuh in May 1947

Deputy Minister of Foreign Affairs of the Korean Provisional Government
- In office 5 August 1919 – 22 January 1920

Chairman of the National People's Representative Conference
- In office 14 September – November 1945
- Preceded by: Position established
- Succeeded by: Position abolished

Vice President of the People's Republic of Korea
- In office 6 September 1945 – 19 February 1946
- Preceded by: Office established
- Succeeded by: Office abolished

Personal details
- Born: 25 May 1886 Yangpyeong, Gyeonggi, Joseon
- Died: 19 July 1947 (aged 61) Rotary road, Hyehwa-dong, Jongno District, Seoul, southern Korea
- Cause of death: Assassination
- Resting place: Ui-dong, Gangbuk District, Seoul, South Korea
- Party: People's Party of Korea (1945–1947); Laboring People's Party (1947)
- Spouse: Jin Sang-ha
- Children: 9
- Parent(s): Lee (Mother); Lyuh Jung-hyun (Father)
- Education: Jinling University, Pyongyang Presbyterian Theological Seminary

Korean name
- Hangul: 여운형
- Hanja: 呂運亨
- RR: Yeo Unhyeong
- MR: Yŏ Unhyŏng

Art name
- Hangul: 몽양
- Hanja: 夢陽
- RR: Mongyang
- MR: Mongyang

Lyuh Woon-hyung (Korean: 여운형; Hanja: 呂運亨; 25 May 1886 – 19 July 1947), also known by his art name Mongyang (몽양; 夢陽), was a Korean independence activist and reunification activist.

Lyuh was a prominent figure in the Korean Provisional Government (KPG) and participated in the creation of the February 8 Declaration of Independence during the Japanese colonial period. He is rare among politicians in modern Korean history for being revered in both South and North Korea.

== Biography ==
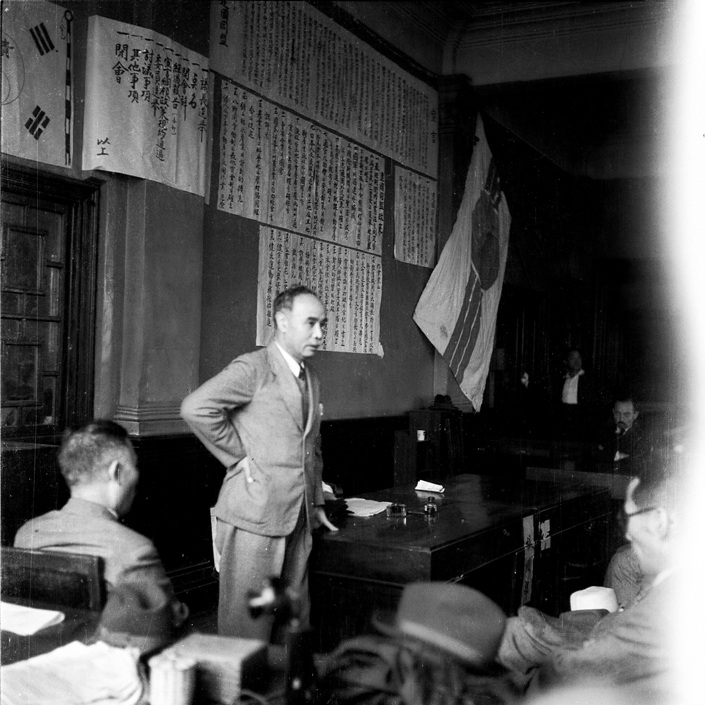
In August 1945, Lyuh organized a meeting with the representatives of "the Committee for Preparation of Korean Independence" who came from all over the country.

Lyuh was born in 1886 in Yangpyeong, Gyeonggi Province, Joseon. He was born into the Hamyang Yeo clan to father Yŏ Chŏng-hyŏn (여정현; 呂鼎鉉). At around age 14, he married Yu Se-yŏng (유세영; 柳世永), but she died, and he remarried to Jin Sang-ha (진상하; 陳相夏).

In 1900, Lyuh enrolled in the Western-style Pai Chai School. Soon afterwards, he switched to studying at the Hŭnghwa School and Umu School (우무학당; 郵務學堂). In 1907, he became involved in the National Debt Repayment Movement, part of the Korean independence movement. Also around then, he became a Protestant and became associated with the American missionary Charles Allen Clark. Through his relationship with Clark and Christianity, he became active in intellectual circles in Korea of the time.

With assistance with Clark, he found the Kidok Kwangdong School in 1909. In 1910, Lyuh dramatically parted from Korean tradition by freeing slaves owned by his household. In 1911, Lyuh enrolled in Pyongyang Presbyterian Theological Seminary.

In 1914, Lyuh went to China, where he studied English literature at a university in Nanjing. In 1917, he moved to Shanghai. While in China, he became significantly involved in the Korean independence movement. In 1918, he established what eventually became the Shanghai Korean People's Association. That year, he also led the New Korean Youth League.

In 1919, Lyuh participated in the creation of the February 8 Declaration of Independence in Tokyo. This declaration is considered a direct precursor to the Korean Declaration of Independence which began the landmark March First Movement protests in Korea. Concurrently, he participated in efforts to send Korean representatives to the 1919–1920 Paris Peace Conference, in hopes that they could advocate for Korean independence there.

In April 1919, Lyuh became one of the founders of the Provisional Government of the Republic of Korea. He would serve in a variety of roles in the government, such as being a member of the organization's Legislative Assembly. He also established a Korean school called Insŏng School in Shanghai around this time. That year, he also visited Japan and met with several high-ranking Japanese politicians, during which he advocated for Korea's independence.

In 1920, he joined the Korean Communist Party and became active in its Shanghai and Irkutsk chapters. In 1922, he attended the Congress of the Peoples of the East in Moscow. In Moscow, he met with Leon Trotsky and Vladimir Lenin. That year, he also organized the Korean Veterans Association alongside Kim Ku and Son Jŏng-do. In 1925, at the recommendation of Sun Yat-sen, he joined the Chinese Nationalist Party and worked to improve Sino-Korean ties. In 1929, he was arrested by Japanese authorities in Shanghai and sentenced to three years in prison.

In 1932, he was released from prison. In 1933, he became the head of the Chŏson Chungang Ilbo newspaper. In 1934, he became head of the Joseon Sports Council. In 1936, he was forced by Japanese authorities to step down from his position at the newspaper, after he became involved in the Sohn Kee-chung uniform scandal in which Korean newspapers erased the Japanese flag from images of Sohn, the first ethnic Korean to win an Olympic gold medal. In 1942, he was arrested on charges of violating the Peace Preservation Law and sentenced to a year in prison and three years of probation.

In 1944, in anticipation of Japan's defeat in World War II, Lyuh organized the secret Korean National Establishment Committee and served as its chairman. The organization expanded across Korea and allied itself with other Korean nationalist organizations.

Just before the surrender of Japan in August 1945, the Japanese official Endo Ryusaku established contact with Lyuh and agreed to the release of prisoners and Japanese withdrawal from Korea. On the 17 August, Lyuh established the Committee for Preparation of Korean Independence which created over 140 subsections in North and South Korea during the remainder of that month.

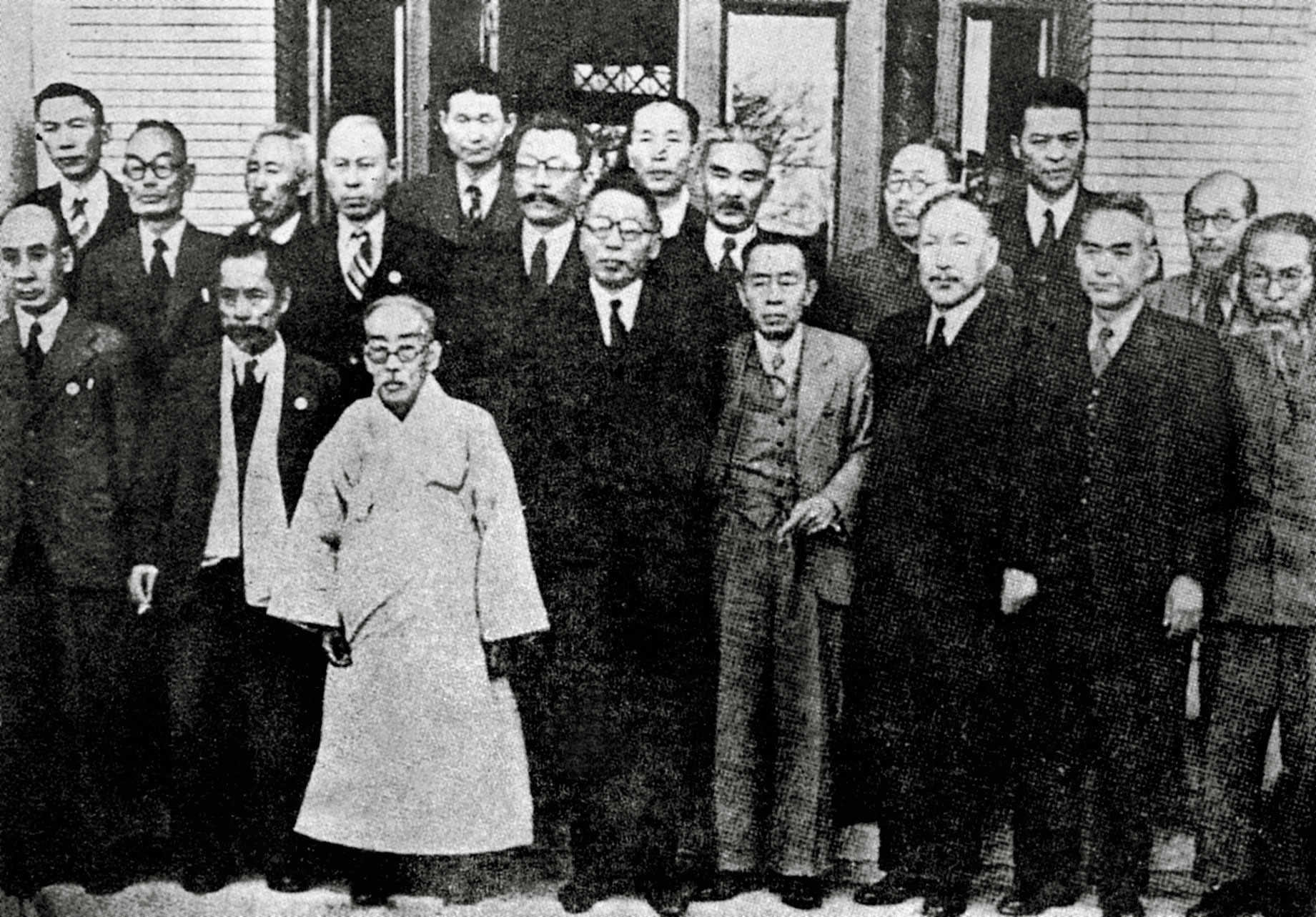
December 3, 1945. A photograph commemorating the return of the Provisional Government leaders with Lyuh Woon-hyung included

On 6 September 1945, Lyuh proclaimed the foundation of the People's Republic of Korea with Lyuh as Chairman of the National People's Representative Conference. However, when the United States landed on the Korean Peninsula two days later, General Hodge did not recognize the government. In October, Lyuh stepped down under pressure from the United States Military Government, and organized the People's Party of Korea, becoming its chairman. In the ensuing months of the anti-trusteeship movement and other political developments, Lyuh took a line of action in concert with the communists.

When a movement to unify the political left and the political right arose in May 1946, Lyuh represented the center-left. However, Lyuh's political stance was attacked by both the extreme right and the extreme left, and his efforts to pursue a centrist position became increasingly untenable in the midst of the turbulent political milieu.

== Death ==
On 19 July 1947, Lyuh was assassinated in Seoul by a 19-year-old man named Han Chi-geun, who fled from North Korea and was an active member of a right-wing terrorist group, the White Shirts Society. Lyuh's death was widely mourned.

== Timeline ==
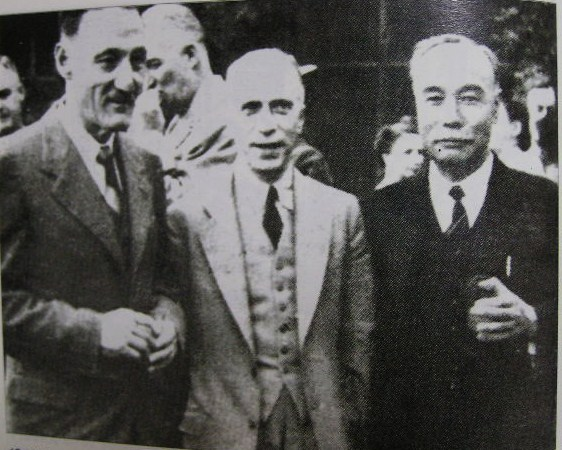
Lyuh during the Soviet-US Committee in May 1946.

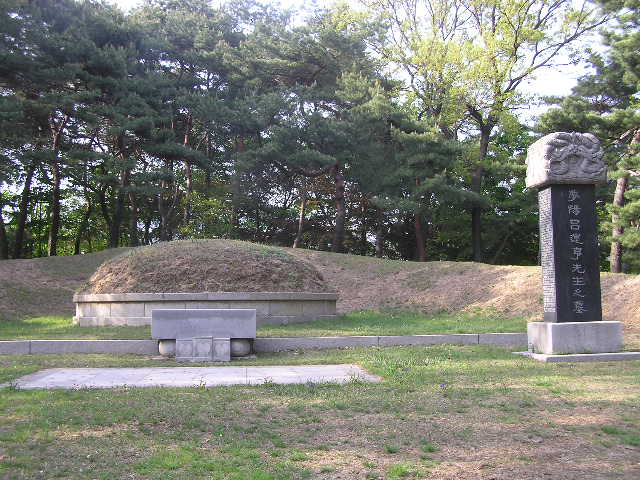
Resting place in Seoul

- 1894 – Moved to Danyang, Chungcheongbuk-do and returned to Myogok after two years.
- 1900 – Enrolled in the Baejae School
- 1901 – Transferred to Heung-hwa School (흥화학교).
- 1902 – Entered school attached to the Correspondent bureau (우무학당).
- 1903 – Spouse died in August. Grandfather died in October.
- 1905 – Mother died.
- 1906 – Father died.
- 1907 – Became Christian. Founded Gwang-dong school (광동학교) in Yangpyeong.
- 1908 – Founded branch of National Debt Repayment Movement in Yangpyeong and toured to speech about it.
- 1910 – Became a teacher of Chodang Uisuk (초당의숙) of Gangneung.
- 1911 – Had been fired from school because of rejecting Japanese era name. Entered to Pyongyang seminarium and studied to 2 years
- 1914 – Entered the English literature course of Jinling University (金陵大学) in Nanjing, studied 3 years.
- 1917 – Got a job of travel Agent at Xiehe bookstore (協和書局) in Shanghai and helped Koreans in passage procedure. Met Sun Yat-sen. In summer, returned to Korea in private. Fled to China with Lee Beom-seok.
- 1918 – Founded New Korea Youth Party in Shanghai and had been appointed to the leader.
- 1919 – Became deputy of Ministry of Foreign Affairs of the Provisional Government of the Republic of Korea in Shanghai.
- 27 November 1919 – Visited Japan and had a speech at the Imperial Hotel about Right to life of Koreans.
- 1920 – Joined the Koryŏ Communist Party in Shanghai and became a translation committee member and propaganda agent.
- 1921 – Established "Korea-China Cooperated company" (Hanjung hojosa, 韓中互助社, 한중호조사) in Shanghai.
- January 1922 – Participated in "Conference for Oppressed people of the Far East" (遠東被壓迫民族大會, 원동피압박민족대회) in Moscow. Met Vladimir Lenin and discussed about anti-imperialism movement in Korea. in October, Organized "Hanguk Nobyunghoe" (韓國勞兵會, 한국노병회) with Kim Ku, Son jung-do etc.
- 1924 – Became a special member of the Chinese Communist Party
- July 1929 – Became coach of the soccer team of Fudan University and went to the Southeast Asia for educational travel with players. While in travel he made a speech of Anti-Imperialism at the Philippines, Singapore etc. Arrested by Japanese police in Shanghai and taken to Korea. Had been sentenced to imprisonment for 3 years.
- November 1932 – Had been released on parole from the prison of Daejeon.
- February 1933 – Became the president of the Chungang Daily News (Chosun JoongAng Ilbo, 조선중앙일보).
- 1934 – Became chairman of the "Korea Sports Council" (조선체육회).
- 1935 – Set up the gravestone in Yi Sun-sin graveyard of Asan.
- August 1936 – Chungang Daily News ceased publication eternally for removing Japanese flag of Sohn Kee-chung's picture.
- 1940 – Gone off to Tokyo and led and inspire Korean students in Japan. Met Fumimaro Konoe, Shūmei Ōkawa.
- December 1942 – Arrested by Military police for violation of "Peace Preservation Law" (治安維持法)
- 1943 – Got released from prison with three years of probation. while retired from active life, he made contact with comrade and led the young people.
- 10 August 1944 – Formed Korean Restoration Brotherhood Secretly in Sam-gwang Oriental Medical Clinic (삼광한의원) in Seoul and expanded it on a nationwide scale. Rejected the suggestion to go to China of Endo Ryusaku (遠藤柳作), the vice-minister of the post of Governor-General of Korea (朝鮮総督府政務総監). Formed the "Farmers' Brotherhood"(농민동맹) at the Yongmunsan in Yangpyeong.
- 15 August 1945 – Met Endo and had been transferred authority of administration and public order from Endo.
- 17 August 1945 – Formed the Committee for Preparation of Korean Independence.

Flag of the People's Committee of Korea

- 6 September 1945 – Had been elected to temporary chairman of "National People's Representative Conference"(전국인민대표자회의 →People's Republic of Korea).
- 12 November 1945 – Formed "People's Party of Korea" (조선 인민당).
- 9 February to 11 February 1946 – Visited Haeju, Pyongyang and met Cho Man-sik, Kim Il Sung.
- 15 February 1946 – Be elected one of the co-chairmen of "National Front for Democracy" (民主主義民族戰線, 민주주의민족전선).
- May 1946 – Propelled "Left-right cooperation movement" (좌우합작운동) with Kim Kyu-sik, An Jae-hong etc.
- 17 July 1946 – kidnapped and taken to a mountain of Sindang-dong, Seoul and escaped risk of being murdered
- 16 October 1946 – Founded "Socialist Labourer's Party" (사회로동당).
- 28 December 1946 to 8 January 1947 – Visited Pyongyang.
- 24 May 1947 – Founded "Labor People's Party" (근로인민당). Had been elected to chairman.
- 19 July 1947 – Assassinated by Han Ji-geun of the White Shirts Society, at the Rotary Road, Hyehwa-dong, Seoul.

== Genealogy ==
- Spouse : Rhew, Se-yeong's daughter (류세영의 장녀, 진주 (柳氏), ? – October 1903, Married 1899–1903)
- Spouse : Jin Sang-ha (진상하, 陳相夏, 1885 – ?)
  - Daughter : Lyuh Nan-gu (여난구, 呂鸞九, 1923 – ?)
  - Daughter : Lyuh Yeon-gu (여연구, 呂鷰九, 1927 – 28 September 1996)
  - Daughter : Lyuh Hyeong-gu (여형구; 呂鶑九)
  - Son : Lyuh Bong-gu (여봉구, 呂鳳九, 1914 – 14 November 1932), died of typhoid fever
  - Son : Lyuh Hong-gu (여홍구, 呂鴻九, 1918 – 1939), died of tetanus
  - Son : Lyuh Young-gu (여영구, 呂鸋九, 1930~?)
- Unknown Japanese woman
  - Son : Lyuh Boong-gu (여붕구, 呂鵬九, 1936 – 1991)
- Jin Ok-chul (진옥출; 陳玉出)
  - Daughter : Lyuh Sun-gu(여순구, 呂鶉九, 1942 – )
- Brother : Lyuh Woon-il (여운일, 呂運一, 1890 – ?)
- Brother : Lyuh Woon-hong (여운홍, 呂運弘, 1 September 1891 – 3 February 1973)
- Sister : Unknown

== Award ==
On 21 February 2008, Lyuh Woon-hyung was posthumously awarded the Order of Merit for National Foundation Republic of Korea Medal.

== In popular culture ==
- Portrayed by Kim Gil-ho in the 1981 MBC TV series The First Republic.
- Portrayed by Kim Yun-hyung in the 2003 SBS TV series Age of Wanderer.
- Portrayed by Shin Goo in the 2006 KBS1 TV series Seoul 1945.
