= Age of Wanderer =

2003 video game

- Developer(s): Joymax
- Publisher(s): OSC
- Platform(s): Windows
- Release: January 27th 2003
- Genre(s): Beat 'em up
- Mode(s): Single-player, multiplayer

Age of Wanderer (Korean: 야인시대), also known as Yainsidae, is a beat 'em up game for PC, developed by Joymax. The game is based on the SBS K-drama Rustic Period.

== Plot ==
Set during the Japanese military occupation of Korea, descendants of both nations were embroiled in a power struggle to control the streets of Jongro, the center of Korean trade. Gangsters harassed the local merchants, who joined forces with the Japanese to upset the balance and disturb the peace of the community.

Spurred into action, Doo Han Kim, leader of the Umi Gang and son of the famous General Jwah Jin Kim, and Sirasoni, a warrior of Manjoo descent and hailed as the "greatest fighter of all time", rise up to challenge the oppressive tyranny. The resistance of the Japanese police, military police, and opposing gangs grew stronger, but Doo Han Kim and Sirasoni takes it to the streets to fight for the common people and restore peace to Jongro.

The mission of this fast-paced game is to defeat the Honmachi Clan, local thugs and gangsters.
