= Politics of Korea =

Politics of Korea may mean:

- Politics of the Joseon dynasty, regarding the dynasty which ruled Korea from 1392 to 1897
- Politics of North Korea
- Politics of South Korea

== See also ==
- North Korea–South Korea relations, often referred to as "inter-Korean politics"
