= Seo Joong-Seok =

South Korean historian (born 1948)

- Born: August 25, 1948 (age 78); Bongdu-ri, Yeonmu-eup, Nonsan, South Korea

Academic background
- Education: Seoul National University (PhD, Bachelor's); Yonsei University (Master's)
- Thesis: Research on Modern and Contemporary Nationalist Movements (《한국근현대민족운동연구》) (1990)

Academic work
- Discipline: Modern Korean History

Korean name
- Hangul: 서중석
- Hanja: 徐仲錫
- RR: Seo Jungseok
- MR: Sŏ Chungsŏk

Seo Joong-Seok (Korean: 서중석; born August 25, 1948) is a South Korean historian.

Some of his publications have been described as "essential". He has been described in South Korea as having the first PhD in the field of modern Korean history ('한국 현대사 박사 제1호').

== Biography ==
Seo was born on August 25, 1948, in Bongdong-ri, Hwangha-myeon, Iksan-gun, North Jeolla Province, South Korea. (Note: Now Bongdu-ri, Yeonmu-eup, Nonsan-gun, South Chungcheong Province. (봉두리, 연무읍, 논산군)) His bongwan is the Daegu Seo clan. He was born the seventh of eight siblings. Three of his siblings died in childhood. Among his surviving siblings was one brother and three sisters. His father was expelled from school in the aftermath of the Daegu Normal School Reading Club Scandal (대구사범학교 독서회사건). After which, he worked as a farmer. Seo's mother also worked as a farmer. Despite their humble means, they were eventually able to send Seo and three of his siblings to college.

In 1955, he enrolled in the Hwanghwa Elementary School. In 1961, he enrolled in the Kanggyeong Middle School. In 1964, he moved in with his older brother in Seoul and attended Seoul High School.

In 1967, he was accepted into the College of Arts and Sciences at Seoul National University, where he studied history. While there, he felt that his grade schools had taught history poorly. He was particularly inspired by the writings of Edmund Wilson and Jean-Jacques Rousseau. Before graduating, he served his mandatory military service, and was discharged in May 1973. By September, he enrolled in school again.

In 1974, while in his fourth year in the History Department, Seo was imprisoned for his participation in the National Federation of Democratic Youth and Students Incident, in which he protested against the dictatorial Fourth Republic of Korea.

Seo received his PhD in 1990. His dissertation, entitled Research on Modern and Contemporary Nationalist Movements (《한국근현대민족운동연구》), is considered to be the first in South Korea that covered modern Korean history.
