= Rustic Period =

2002–2003 South Korean television series

- Hangul: 야인시대
- Hanja: 野人時代
- Lit.: The Age of Wild Men
- RR: Yainsidae
- MR: Yainsidae
- Genre: Period drama
- Written by: Lee Hwan-kyeong
- Starring: Ahn Jae-mo; Kim Yeong-cheol; Choi Cheol-ho; Lee Won-jong; Lee Chang-hoon
- Country of origin: South Korea
- Original language: Korean
- No. of episodes: 124

Production
- Running time: 50 minutes
- Production company: SBS Drama Division

Original release
- Network: SBS
- Release: July 29, 2002 – September 30, 2003

Rustic Period (Korean: 야인시대) is a South Korean television series aired from July 29, 2002, to September 30, 2003, on SBS. It focused on the life of historical figure Kim Du-han, a former mob leader turned politician, and the tumultuous modern history of Korea from the Japanese occupation to Park Chung Hee regime.

The show aired on SBS on Mondays to Tuesdays at 22:00 for 124 episodes beginning July 29, 2002, and still remains as one of the highest-rated television shows in Korean broadcast history.

== Cast ==
=== Main ===
- Ahn Jae-mo as Kim Du-han (Part 1)
  - Kim Yeong-cheol as older Kim Du-han (Part 2)
- Choi Cheol-ho as Uhm Dong-wook
- Lee Won-jong as Goo Ma-juk
- Lee Chang-hoon as Hyashi

=== Supporting ===
- Choi Dong-joon as Kim Jwa-jin
- Lee Duk-hee as Mrs. Oh
- Jung Young-sook as Doo-han's grandmother
- Jeon Mi-seon as Park Gye-sook
- Go Doo-shim as Doo-han's grandmother
- Jo Hyung-ki as Doo-han's uncle
- Lee Soon-jae as Won Yeong-gi
- Jung Dong-hwan as Choi Dong-yeol
- Choi Hang-suk as Im Dong-ho
- Lee Won-yong as Kim Yi-soo
- Lee Jae-po as Wang Bal
- Jung Eun-chan as Moong Chi
- Yoon Taek-sang as Sya Cheu
- Park Jun-gyu as Ssang Kkal
- Park Young-rok as Kim Young-tae
- Jang Se-jin as Moon Yeong-cheol
- Choi Sang-hak as Beon Kae
- Jang Dong-jik as Yoo Tae-gwon
- Son Jong-bum as Na Suk-joo
- Lee Jae-yong as Miwa Wasaburo
- Kim Sung-soo as Omura
- Kim Ho-jin as Kim Tae-seo
- Yang Hyung-ho as Moon Dal-young
- Sung Dong-il as Kae Ko
  - Lee Dong-hoon as young Kae Ko
  - Ryu Jong-won as child Kae Ko
- Lee Sang-in as Gamisora
- Lee Se-chang as Shibaru
- Park Seung-ho as Miura
- Nam Il-woo as Gonoe
- Heo Young-ran as Sul Hyang
- Jo Yeo-jung as Ae Ran
- Jung So-young as Park In-ae
- Nam Hyun-joo as Maria Park
- Lee In-cheol as Lee Ki-bung
- Kwon Sung-deok as Syngman Rhee
- Moon Hoe-won as Kim Yoo-shik
- Jo Sang-goo as Shirasoni
- Suh Hyun-suk as Jung Jin-young
  - Kim Jung-min as young Jung Jin-young
- Lee Il-hwa as Lee Yeon Suk
- Im Byung-ki as Park Hun-young
- Nam Sung-jin as Kwak Young-joo
- Jun Moo-song as Saitō Makoto
- Bae Do-hwan as Han Baek-soo
- Shim Hyung-tak as Jung Woon-kyung
- Park Jung-hak as Tokuyama
- Kim Hyuk as Lee Jung-jae
  - Kim Yeong-ho as old Lee Jung-jae
- Lee Hyo-jung as Yu Chin-san
- Kim Hak-cheol as Chough Pyung-ok
- Lim Hyeok-ju as Chang Taek-sang
- Ahn Shin-woo as Park In-suk
- Kim Young-in as Shim Young
- Jo Sang-gi as Sanghai Jo
- Kim Ji-young as Congresswoman Park Soon-cheon
- Lee Dae-ro as Yeom Dong-jin

=== Cameos ===
- Choi Jae-sung
- Choi Il-hwa
- Lee Seung-gi
- Kim Hee-jung
- Kim Jong-kook

== See also ==
- Age of Wanderer: Beat 'em up video game for PC, developed by Joymax. Based on this drama.
