= Yi Sung-sun =

South Korean street knight (1916-1983)

Yi Sung Sun (이성순, 李聖淳, February 29, 1916 – January 25, 1983), nicknamed Sirasoni (시라소니), was a South Korean street knight. He was born in 1916, in the North Korean city of Sinuiju.

After the independence of Korea, Yi ran away to South Korea to join with his gangster friend Yi Hwa-ryong's gangs of Myeongdong. After the Korean War broke out, Yi worked in the Headquarters of the Intelligence Detachment. In 1953, the political hoodlum Yi Jung-jae lured Yi out and lynched him, making him Yi disabled. Yi left the gangs, and escorted Chang Myon and Shin Ik-Hee from political hoodlums.

== Popular culture ==
- Portrayed by Jo Sang-goo in the 2002-2003 SBS TV series Rustic Period.
