= Cho Man-sik =

Korean independence activist (1883–1950)

- 조만식
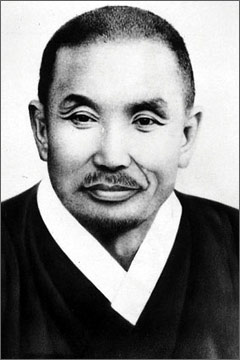
- Cho Man-sik

Personal details
- Born: 1 February 1883 Kangseo County, Pyeongan Province, Joseon
- Died: Possibly October 1950 (aged 67) Pyongyang, North Korea
- Cause of death: Execution by firing squad (presumed)
- Spouse(s): • Lady Park • Yi Eui-sik • Jeon Seon-ae
- Children: • 1st marriage: 1 son • 2nd marriage: 2 sons, 2 daughters • 3rd marriage: 2 sons, 1 daughter
- Education: Meiji University

Korean name
- Hangul: 조만식
- Hanja: 曺晩植
- RR: Jo Mansik
- MR: Cho Mansik

Art name
- Hangul: 고당
- Hanja: 古堂
- RR: Godang
- MR: Kodang

Cho Man-sik (Korean: 조만식; 1 February 1883 – ?), also known by his art name Godang (고당), was a Korean independence activist.

He became involved in the power struggle that enveloped North Korea in the months following the Japanese surrender after World War II. Originally, Cho was supported by the Soviet Union for the eventual rule of North Korea. However, due to his opposition to the USA proposed trusteeship, Cho lost Soviet support and was forced from power by the Soviet-backed and pro Soviet communists in the north (a predecessor of the Workers' Party of Korea).

Placed under house arrest in January 1946, he later disappeared into the North Korean prison system, where confirmed reports of him end. He is generally believed to have been executed soon after the start of the Korean War, possibly in October 1950.

== Early life ==
Cho was born on 1 February 1883 in Kangsŏ-gun, South P'yŏngan Province, Joseon. He was of the Changnyeong Jo clan. He was raised and educated in a traditional Confucian style but later converted to Protestantism and became an elder. From June 1908 to 1913 Cho moved to Japan to study law in Tokyo at Meiji University. It was during his stay in Tokyo that Cho came into contact with Gandhi's ideas of non-violence and self-sufficiency. Cho also admired the teachings of Jesus Christ and writings of Leo Tolstoy. Cho later used these ideas of non-violent opposition to resist Japanese rule.

== Independence movement ==
After Japan's annexation of Korea in 1910 Cho became increasingly involved with his country's independence movement. His participation in the March First Movement led to his arrest and detention, along with tens of thousands of other Koreans. He is also famous for publicly rejecting the Japanese Imperial government's policy of pressuring Koreans to legally change their surnames into Japanese. He was imprisoned for helping organize the 1 March Movement. In 1922 Cho established the Korean Products Promotion Society with the objective of achieving economic self-sufficiency and that Koreans could obtain solely home-produced products. Cho intended the Society to be a national movement supported by all religious organizations and social groups, particularly ordinary Koreans. Due to the Korean Products Promotion Society, his strong non-violent resistance, and leading by example rather than political or social authority, Cho gained respect even from critics, and earned himself the title "Gandhi of Korea". Despite this record, his encouragement of Korean student enlistment in the Imperial Japanese Armed Forces earned him a mixed reputation with some of his fellow nationalists.

== Post-World War II activism ==
In August 1945, with Japanese surrender imminent, Cho was approached by the Japanese governor of Pyongyang and asked to organise a committee to assume control and maintain stability in the power vacuum that would inevitably follow. He agreed to co-operate, and on 17 August 1945 formed the Provisional People's Committee for the Five Provinces. He also joined the cabinet of the People's Republic of Korea, making the Provisional People's Committee for the Five Provinces its northern branch. The committee functioned to standardize the number of members, duties, and electoral processes for the formation of People's Committees at the provincial, city, country, township, and village levels. Cho also affiliated this committee to the Committee for the Preparation of Korean Independence (CPKI). The Provisional People's Committee for the Five Provinces generally composed of right-wing nationalists opposed to communism.

When the Soviet Civil Administration arrived in Pyongyang following the Japanese surrender they hoped they could influence Cho Man-sik. Cho was at this time the most popular leader in Pyongyang due mainly to his constant resistance to the Japanese and his formation of the Korean Products Promotions Society. Soviet officers regularly met with Cho and tried to convince him to head the emerging North Korea administration. Cho however disliked communism and did not trust foreign powers. Cho Man-sik would have agreed to co-operate with the Soviet authorities only on his own terms, such as extensive autonomy. Cho's conditions were not accepted by the Soviet leaders and supervisors. Despite his rejection of Soviet requests he was able to remain as chairman of the South P'yŏngan People's Committee.

On 3 November 1945, Cho also established his own political party: The Democratic Party of Korea. He wished to turn into an authentic political organization of the nationalist right with the aim of bringing about a democratic society after Japanese occupation. The Soviets, however, did not approve of the Democratic Party of Korea and thus under their pressure, Choi Yong-kun was elected the first deputy chairman of the party. Choi Yong-kun was a secret member of the Worker’s Party of Korea tasked with controlling the Party and preventing it from being a challenge, as found by Andrei Lankov in the research on declassified Soviet archives.

Publicly he had been a guerrilla soldier who served in the 88th Separate Rifle Brigade as sort of the Red Army, and was a friend of a Korean communist and pro-Soviet officer Kim Il Sung, who also was in the Brigade, and the Northeast Counter-Japanese United Army whose remnants the former was created to accommodate in 1942. The party was therefore influenced by the Soviets from the beginning.

Under Soviet pressure, Cho was obliged to reorganize the Provisional People's Committee for the Five Provinces, and accept more communists onto the people’s councils. The opposing ideologies of Kim and Cho led to a clash between the two men, and the forced power-sharing failed to sit well with either of them.

The 1945 Moscow Conference between the victorious Allies discussed the statehood of Korea, proposing a four-power trusteeship for a period of five years, after which Korea would become an independent state. For Cho, this would result in excessive foreign, and particularly communist, influence over his country, and he refused to co-operate. On 1 January 1946, Andrey Alekseyevich Romanenko, a Soviet leader, met with Cho and tried to persuade him to sign support of the trusteeship. Cho however, refused to sign support. After Soviet leaders realized that they could not persuade Cho to endorse Soviet trusteeship, they lost all remaining hope of Cho becoming a prominent North Korean leader reflecting Soviet ideals. The Soviets were also displeased by Cho's Christian faith and his open protests against war crimes committed by the Soviet occupation force. On 5 January, Cho was arrested by Soviet soldiers and detained in Pyongyang's Koryo Hotel.

For some time he was kept under comfortable conditions at the Koryo Hotel, from which position he continued to vocally oppose the communists. The Soviet Civil Administration discredited Cho by spreading rumors that he collaborated with Japan. He stood in the 1948 vice-presidency election, but by then the Communist influence in the country's affairs was too strong, and he was unsuccessful, receiving only 10 votes from the National Assembly. Cho was later transferred to a prison in Pyongyang, where confirmed reports of him end. In June 1950, days before the North Korean invasion of South Korea, the Northern and Southern governments reached a tentative agreement to exchange Cho and his son for jailed South Korean Workers' Party leaders Kim Sam-yong and Yu Ju-ha. However, by 24 June the two sides could not agree on a modality of exchange. After the start of the war the next day, Kim and Yu were executed at Namsan in Seoul. Cho is generally believed to have been executed along with other political prisoners during the early days of the Korean War, possibly in October 1950. The North Korean defector Park Gil-yong claimed Cho was killed by the Korean People's Army in a massacre of 5,000 inmates during its evacuation of Pyongyang. However, the CIA claimed in 1962 that "Kim kept him imprisoned for years without any trial and made him die in agony of senility." The agency reported Cho still living in a North Pyong'an prison camp as late as December 1953. Cho's ouster had been part of the process of power consolidation around Kim Il Sung in the north, a position he was able to hold for 48 years until his death in 1994, when he was succeeded by his son Kim Jong Il and later, since 2011, his grandson Kim Jong Un in which the Kim dynasty continues to exist to this day.

== Legacy ==
In 1970, Cho's deeds gained posthumous recognition when the South Korean government awarded him the Order of the Republic of Korea in the Order of Merit for National Foundation.

Cho Man-sik, Gye-Jun Ryu, Kim Dong-won, and Oh Yun-seon are cited as the pillars of the Sanjunghyun Church in Pyongyang.

The Taekwon-Do form Ko-Dang was named in honour of Cho Man-sik.

=== Popular culture ===
- Portrayed by actor Park Jong-gwan in the 1981–82 TV series, 1st Republic.

== Family ==
- Father – Jo Gyeong-hak (조경학; 曺景學; ? – 1930)
- Mother – Kim Gyeong-geon (김경건; 金敬虔) of the Gyeongju Kim clan (경주 김씨; ? – 1931)
- Sibling(s)
  - Younger sister – Jo Eun-sik (조은식; 1887 – ?)
- Wives and their children
  - Lady Park (박씨; 朴氏; 1880–1902)
    - Son – Jo Chil-sung (조칠숭; 曺七崇; 1899–1909)
  - Yi Eui-sik (이의식; 李義植) of the Jeonju Yi clan (1885 – 18 December 1935)
    - Daughter – Jo Seon-bu (조선부; 曺善富; 1910 – ?)
    - Son – Jo Yeon-chang (조연창)
    - Son – Jo Yeon-myeong (조연명; 曺然明; 20 May 1914 – 1989)
    - Daughter – Jo Seon-hui (조선희; 曺善姬; 1916 – ?)
  - Jeon Seon-ae (전선애; 田善愛; 22 September 1904 – 29 March 2000)
    - Son – Jo Yeon-heung (조연흥; 曺然興; 6 February 1940)
    - Son – Jo Yeon-su (조연수)
    - Daughter – Jo Seon-yeong (조선영)

== See also ==
- People's Republic of Korea
- Pak Hon-yong
- Lyuh Woon-hyung

== Bibliography ==
- Armstrong, Charles; Post, Jerrold (2004), The North Korean Revolution, 1945–1950, Cornell University Press, ISBN 0-8014-8914-8
- Eckert, Carter (1990), Korea, Old and New: A History, Seoul: The Korea Institute, Harvard University, ISBN 0-9627713-0-9
- Kim, Chun-gil (2005), The History of Korea, London: Greenwood, ISBN 0-313-33296-7
- Lankov, Andrey (2002), From Stalin to Kim Il Song, Hurst & Co, ISBN 1-85065-563-4
- Lee, Jong-soo (2006), The Partition of Korea after World War II, Basingstoke: Palgrave Macmillan, ISBN 1-4039-6982-5
- Oliver, Robert (1989), Leadership in Asia: Persuasive Communication in the Making of Nations, 1850-1950, University of Delaware Press, ISBN 0-87413-353-X
- Pratt, K.L.; Hoare, J.; Rutt, R. (1999), Korea: A Historical and Cultural Dictionary, Routledge, ISBN 978-0-7007-0464-4
- Ree, Erik (1989), Socialism in One Zone: Stalin's Policy in Korea, 1945-1947, Oxford: Berg, ISBN 0-85496-274-3
- Wells, Kenneth (1990), New God, New Nation: Protestants and Self-reconstruction Nationalism in Korea, 1896-1937, Honolulu: University of Hawaii Press, ISBN 0-8248-1338-3
