= Ahn Chai-hong =

Korean politician and journalist (1891–1965)

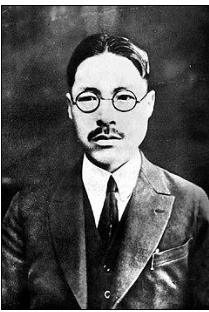

Personal details
- Born: 30 December 1891 Pyeongtaek, Gyeonggi Province, Korean Empire
- Died: 1 March 1965 (aged 73) Pyongyang, North Korea

Korean name
- Hangul: 안재홍
- Hanja: 安在鴻
- RR: An Jaehong
- MR: An Chaehong

Art name
- Hangul: 민세
- Hanja: 民世
- RR: Minse
- MR: Minse

Ahn Chai-hong (Korean: 안재홍; Hanja: 安在鴻; 30 December 1891 – 1 March 1965) was a Korean independence activist, politician, and member of the 2nd National Assembly of South Korea. His art name was Minse, and his clan name was Sunheung Ahn.

== Biography ==
Ahn Chai-hong was born in the city of Pyeongtaek, Gyeonggi Province on 30 December 1891. In 1911, he matriculated at the Waseda University School of Political Science and Economics. The next year, he organized the Korean Students’ Association, centered around Korean students living in Tokyo, in an effort to increase Korean national consciousness. In January 1913, he traveled to Shanghai, China, where he joined a Korean independence society, the Dongje Association.

After graduating, Chai-hong returned to Korea and became a teacher for a time, but in April 1919, he organized the Youth Diplomatic Corps in Keijō (present-day Seoul), under the orders of the Korean Provisional Government, and while working as its general affairs officer, he was arrested under suspicion of participating in the March First Movement. On 27 September 1920, he was sentenced to three years in prison by the Daegu Court of Appeals.

In January 1927, while serving as editor-in-chief of The Chosun Ilbo, Chai-hong was appointed Secretary of General Affairs for the independence group Singanhoe. After drafting and announcing the organization’s platform, he made an address at Singanhoe’s general meeting, in which he expressed support for regional general meetings and promoted national consciousness. Furthermore, to support his countrymen living in Manchuria, Chai-hong worked as chairman of the “Alliance Executive Committee.”

In July 1928, Ahn Chai-hong was sentenced to eight months in prison by the Keijō Court of Appeals, because of controversial article published in The Chosun Ilbo. He immediately appealed his case, but his appeal was rejected and his sentence confirmed.

In December 1929, when the Gwangju Student Independence Movement broke out in Gwangju, Zenranan Province (modern-day South Jeolla), Chai-hong resigned from his position as executive vice-president of The Chosun Ilbo. In collaboration with the political group Singanhoe, he then organized the Korean People’s Assembly to publicly denounce Japan. As a result, Chai-hong was arrested again, but on 1 January, the charges were suspended.

In May 1937, Chai-hong was arrested yet again, due to his involvement with a student recruiting campaign for the Nanjing Military Academy, and on 4 May 1938, the Keijō Court of Appeals sentenced him to two years in prison for violating the Peace Preservation Law. In March the next year, he became actively involved with the Industrial Development Club.

In December 1942, Chai-hong was suspected of taking part in the Korean Language Society Incident, and was imprisoned at a police station in Hongwon County, Kankyōnan Province (modern-day South Hamgyong), where he remained until the end of the war.

Chai-hong later became vice-chairperson of the Committee for the Preparation of Korean Independence, but he eventually resigned as left-wing influences became predominant. He then joined the Korea Independence Party and contributed to the establishment of the Korean government, as both the Civil Governor of the United States Military Government, and as a member of the Korean House of Representatives. He also served as charmed of the Korean Olympic Supporters Association.

However, after the Korean War began in 1950, Chai-hong was taken captive by North Korea, and passed away in Pyongyang in 1965, on the anniversary of the March First Independence Movement.

== Recognition ==
To celebrate Ahn Chai-hong’s meritorious deeds, the Korean government posthumously awarded him the Presidential Medal of the Order of Merit for National Foundation in 1989.
