= Left–Right Coalition Movement =

Political movement in Korea

The Left–Right Coalition Movement (Korean: 좌우합작운동) was a movement during the division of Korea led by centrists in 1946. It sought to promote cooperation between the left and right-wing of Korea in establishing a unified, peninsula-wide government after Japanese occupation. To this end, it formed a Left–Right Coalition Committee that brought together Korean politicians from across the political spectrum. It eventually failed in its goal due to increasing political polarization and the loss of the support of the United States, which adopted a firmer anti-communist stance around the beginning of the Cold War.

== Background ==
=== Political factions ===
After the liberation of Korea, there were a number of political movements in the United States Army Military Government in Korea.

- National Association, led by Syngman Rhee – for the Rapid Realization of Korean Independence.
- Korea Democratic Party, led by Song Jin-woo and Kim Seong-su – right-wing party that opposed the trusteeship and desired the establishment of a sole government in the South.
- Korean Provisional Government (KPG), led by Kim Ku – right-wing party that opposed the trusteeship and desired a united government of the South and North.
- Communist Party of Korea, led by Pak Hon-yong – left-wing party that supported the agreement of the Moscow Conference and desired a unified government of the South and North.
- Moderates, such as Lyuh Woon-hyung, Kim Kyu-sik, Ahn Chai-hong – prudent regarding the issue of trusteeship and desired to establish a unified government of the South and North with the Left–Right Coalition Movement, as well as resumption of the US-Soviet Joint Commission.

=== 1945 Moscow Conference ===
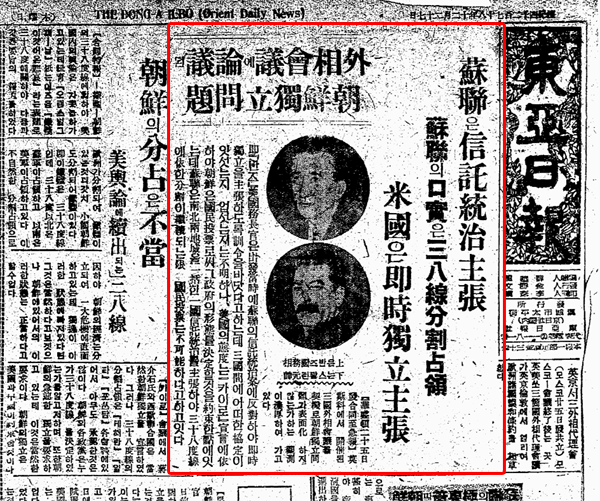
A front-page article published in The Dong-a Ilbo on December 27, 1945. The article reads, "The issue of Joseon independence was discussed at the Moscow Conference (1945). The Soviet Union claims trusteeship; the Soviet Union's rationale is the divisional occupation of the 38th parallel north, and the United States' immediate claim of independence."

During the Moscow Conference of December 1945, conflict between the left and right intensified over the issue of the proposed four-power trusteeship. From the left-wing, Pak Hon-yong announced a statement in support of the trusteeship, while the right-wing censored Pak's statement and initiated an anti-trusteeship movement, which was led by Kim Ku and Syngman Rhee. On 27 December, the day after the conference ended, Kim Kyu-sik stated his disapproval of the trusteeship, but he eventually admitted the inevitability of the trusteeship. Ahn Chai-hong was also initially against the trusteeship but later acquiesced. Within the Korea Democratic Party, Song Jin-woo insisted on being prudent about the trusteeship and met with the KPG at their headquarters at 10 p.m. on 29 December. However, the following day, Song was assassinated by Han Hyeon-wu, a member of the right-wing terrorist organization the White Shirts Society.

On January 8, the leaders of the four Korean political parties (Korea Democratic Party, National Association, Communist Party of Korea, People's Party of Korea), with Lyuh Woon-hyung from the People's Party of Korea, as well as the provisional government, gathered and discussed the trusteeship. They recognized that the Moscow Conference had secured the independence of Korea. Thus, trusteeship should be solved by the government to be established in the future. This meeting was significant, since it not only saw agreement between the major parties of the left and right wings after independence, but also a formal agreement between the left and right regarding the decisions of the Moscow Conference. However, this agreement was revoked less than a day later, because of the opposition to it by the conservatives of the Korea Democratic Party and moderate politicians of the provisional government. It now seemed to be impossible to find a compromise between the supporters and opponents of the trusteeship,.

=== First US-Soviet Joint Commission and Statement in Jeongeup ===
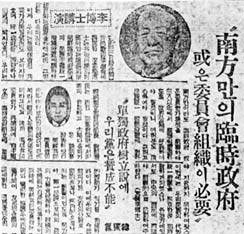
A front-page article in the Seoul Shinmun that reported Syngman Rhee's statement, in Jeongeup on June 3, 1946, that claimed the establishment of an independent South Korean government.

In March 1946, the first US-Soviet Joint Commission was held. The Soviet Union agreed to "give the right to participate in the united provisional government to those who would support the Moscow Conference", but the United States stated that they should "give the right to participate in the united provisional government to all the political parties". When it was not possible to find a compromise, the commission was postponed indefinitely.

In June 1946, the conflict between the left and right severely intensified, due to the statement of Syngman Rhee in Jeongeup. He wanted to establish a sole government, and a rally "to establish a sole government" was held by the National Front for Democracy Commission.

== Development and goals ==
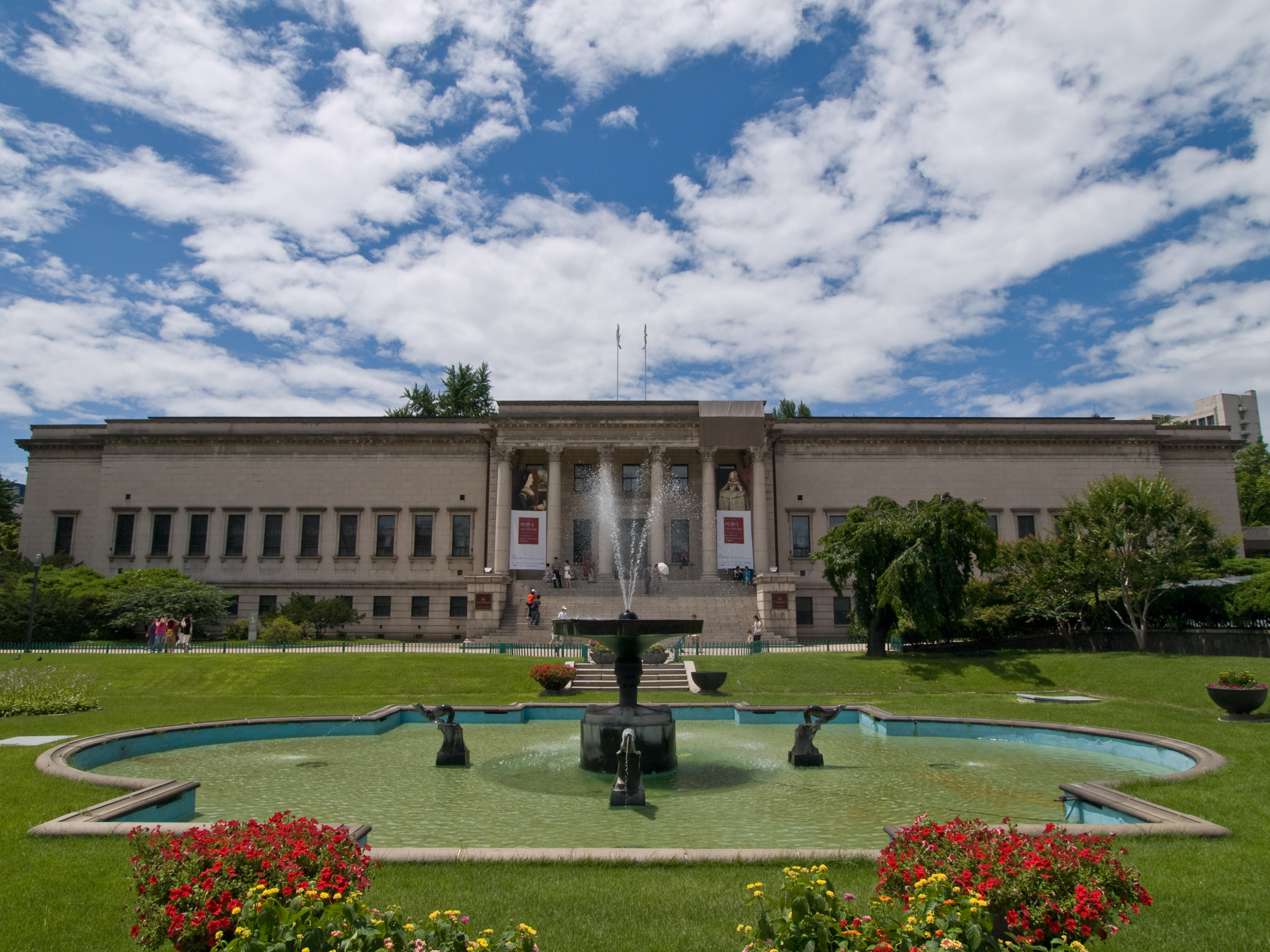
Seokjojeon of Deoksugung, where the US–Soviet Joint Commission sat and the conference of Left–Right Coalition Movement was held.

As the conflict between the left and right intensified, the moderates feared that the South and North would be divided and that the US-Soviet Joint Commission would not be resumed. The moderates—including Lyuh, Kim Kyu-sik, and Ahn—took the lead in establishing the Left–Right Coalition Committee in July 1946 and elected Kim Kyu-sik as chairman of the committee.

The committee consisted of the moderates from the right, including Kim Kyu-sik, Ahn, Won Sehun, Choi Dongoh, Kim Bungjun, and Kim Yaksu; and from the left, including Lyuh, Ho Hon, Seong Jusik, Jang Geonsang, Lee Young, Jeong Nosik, Jeong Baek, and Yi Kang-guk.

The Left–Right Coalition Movement's ultimate goal was to unify Korea, with a unified government that had a moderate ideology. The Committee discussed five issues brought up by the left and eight issues brought up by the right and agreed upon seven principles in October 1946, three months after its establishment. The seven principles were:

1. According to the decision of the Moscow Conference of Foreign Ministers, which had secured the democratic independence of Joseon, to establish a democratic provisional government with a coalition of the Left and Right.
2. To issue a joint communique to requesting quick resumption of US-Soviet Joint Committee
3. Regarding land reform, with confiscation with conditions or confiscation and sales of land with degression, to distribute land to tenant farmers free of charge, to handle bases and large buildings of towns appropriately, to nationalize major industries, to establish autonomous regional governments based on labor regulations and political liberty, to handle issues, such as currency and public welfare, quickly, and to strive for accomplishment of tasks for the establishment of a democratic state.
4. To propose ordinances to hand pro-Japanese groups and traitors to the country to the legislative body of the Coalition Committee for the committee to reach a decision via a hearing and to execute its decision.
5. Regarding the unification of the South and North, to attempt to release political activists, arrested under the current political authority, and to prevent any terroristic actions of the Left and Right of the South and North immediately.
6. Regarding the legislative body, for the Coalition Committee to file an alternative draft for its authority, methods of the constitution, and operation of it, and to execute it promptly.
7. To attempt to guarantee freedom of journalism, assembly, publication, transportation, and elections.

The seven principles had significant meaning beyond ideology and ideas since it was the precious fruit of concession by the left and right in a chaotic, divided political situation. Of the seven principles, the Article 3 (concerning land reform) and Article 4 (suppressing pro-Japanese groups) were the most important. Some on the committee strongly opposed the principles and even criticized the Left–Right Coalition Movement itself.

The Korea Democratic Party opposed these principles while stating that, among the methods proposed for land reform (confiscation with payment and free distribution), free distribution would induce a financial catastrophe. On the other hand, the Communist Party of Korea opposed confiscation with payment as benefiting landlords, and also opposed that the decision of a legislative body could not overrule the veto of the United States Army Military Government in Korea.

In the process of discussion for the seven principles, the United States Army Military Government in Korea would support the Left–Right Coalition indirectly because its support for the Right had reached an impasse. Having lost its faith in Syngman Rhee and Ku Kim, the US military government returned to supporting moderate politicians, such as Lyuh and Kim Kyu-sik, in seeking another way. With such intervention and indirect support of the military government, the movement gained momentum and constituted and enacted the 1946 South Korean legislative election (to an interim legislative body of the US military government) in December 1946. Hence, in 1946, the Left–Right Coalition, unifying the left and right of the reasonable and moderate, with its center led by Lyuh and Kim Kyu-sik, made its sudden rise.

== Reactions ==
Regarding the Left–Right Coalition Movement, the Korea Independence Party and Shinhan-major Party, led by Kim Ku, officially stated its endorsement. While internally agreeing to the establishment of a sole government of Syngman Rhee, there were many of those who opposed the coalition. The opinion of the chairman of Korea Independence Party, Kim Ku, had a rather indifferent attitude, rather than participating enthusiastically. Jo So-ang, an insider of Korea Independence Party, was critical of the coalition, since an "agenda of trusteeship should guarantee anti-trusteeship." Meanwhile, Sin Ik-hui opposed the idea. The Korea Independence Party appeared to be passive about the Left–Right Coalition, as there was much criticism of the coalition in relation to how to deal with the Chinilpa (collaborators). Syngman Rhee also had a rather ambiguous opinion of the coalition, while Chinilpa groups and the Korea Democratic Party, including The Dong-a Ilbo with Kim Seong-su, had a pretty negative opinion of the coalition, as it could mean the fall of the Korea Democratic Party.

On the other hand, the moderates and communists, including Pak and the Communist Party of Korea, never had a positive opinion of the coalition. In May 1946, after the occurrence involving counterfeit money of Jeongpansa, suppression of communists and arrest orders against executives of communist parties by the United States Army Military Government in Korea became even more serious. As communist parties become radicalized and responded to the US military government with a general strike in September and the Autumn Uprising of 1946, they had a head-on collision with the US military government. Therefore, communists called the activists of the Left–Right Coalition Movement as "opportunists seeking for a connection with the US military government", and adopted an extremely negative opinion of the coalition.

Thus, the left and right from the Workers' Party of South Korea and Korea Democratic Party opposed the coalition and were absent from its events.

=== Press reaction ===
During the period of US military governments after independence, Kim Kyu-sik's and Lyuh's calls for the "Establishment of a democratic state by the coalition of the left and right" received widespread public support.

According to a survey of 8,000 participants conducted by the military government in August 1946, responses indicating preferred forms of government were as follows: popular politics (representative politics), 85%; class dictatorship, 3%; socialism in relation to the system, 70%; capitalism, 14%; and communism, 7%. Regarding this, Suh Jung-seok, a history professor at Sungkyunkwan University, stated that "opportunists were found in the radical left and right" and that although Kim Kyu-sik, Ahn, Lyuh, and Jo So-ang, etc., had received death threats, they decided that the risk was worth taking for the establishment of a unified nation-state.

== Solidarity ==
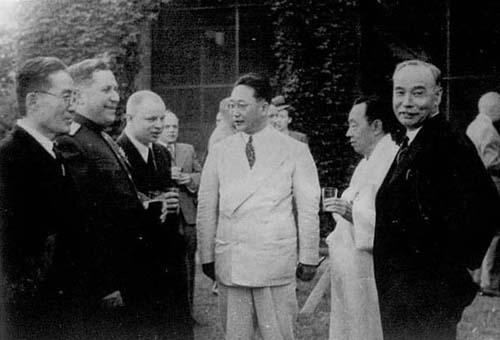
May 1947. Picture of 2nd US–Soviet Joint Commission. From the right, Lyuh, Kim Kyu-sik, Lee Myomuk, Maleek, Terenty Shtykov (Commander of the Soviet Union military government), and Heo Heon

By 1947, the politicians of the US had failed in their attempt to cooperate with the Soviet Union. Following this and facing the rise of McCarthyism, some progressive officers of the US Department of State were imprisoned and accused of being communist sympathizers; and the US's Korea policies rapidly changed to favoring an anti-communist stance. Moreover, reacting to the presence of communist-occupied Joseon (North Korea) influenced the US military government, and political moderates faced several assassination attempts by terrorists.

Under these circumstances, on May 21, 1947, the 2nd US-Soviet Joint Committee was resumed. Political parties and organization of the Right, which opposed trusteeship before the meeting of the US-Soviet Joint Committee, refused to cooperate with the Joint Committee. Some moderate members of the Korea Democratic Party, however, insisted on participating, without pre-condition; and some moderates defected from the party.

On May 23, 1947, the moderates of the Left–Right Coalition Committee issued a statement to say that their greatest goal, resumption of the joint committee, had been achieved and that they should "establish a unified democratic provisional government as soon as possible", under Kim Kyu-sik, as stated in the Seven Principles of the Coalition.

In the turn of events, for the left, moderates, and most of the Right, participation in the US-Soviet Joint Committee became inevitable in establishing a unified provisional government; and they decided to take part in the US-Soviet Joint Committee under conditions such as that "issues with trusteeship should be opposed by national unity after establishing a new provisional government". Along with the successful promotion of the US-Soviet Joint Committee, the Left–Right Coalition Committee was concerned even more than the moderates in establishing a unified provisional government.

== Failure and dissolution ==
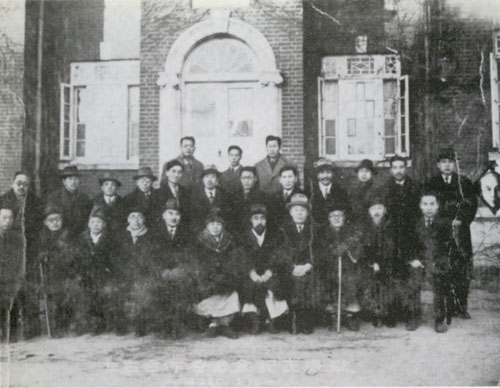
December 1947, disbanding ceremony of Left–Right Coalition Movement

At this point, the US military government reinforced suppression of the left, such as Communist Party of Korea, and supported the Left–Right Coalition Movement. As the Cold War intensified, however, the US military government retracted its promise to support the coalition in March 1947 and supported the political right.

For a while, the coalition, led by the moderates—Kim Kyu-sik, Lyuh, and Ahn—desired the establishment of a unified provisional government. As the conflicts between the left and right intensified, the moderates experienced several incidents of terror and threats against their lives from the radical right and left.

Following this, on July 19, 1947, Lyuh, the central figure of the moderate left and right and a central figure of Left–Right Coalition Movement, was assassinated; and the Left–Right Coalition Movement itself lost its ability to proceed further. Soon, in October 1947, the second US-Soviet Joint Committee disbanded; and the United States transferred its authority over issues with the Korean Peninsula to the United Nations.

In December 1947, the Left–Right Coalition Committee confronted its failure and officially disbanded. Thus, the Left–Right Coalition Movement to establish a "unified provisional government" faced frustration, failed its attempt, and the Korean Peninsula saw the establishment of a separate government in South Korea. Though the Left–Right Coalition Movement had failed, its aim was carried into south–north negotiations by Kim Kyu-sik.

== See also ==
- First United Front
- Pak Hon-yong
- Korea Democratic Party
- People's Party of Korea
- Korea Independence Party
