= Korean Trade Union National Council =

1945–1948 labor union in South Korea

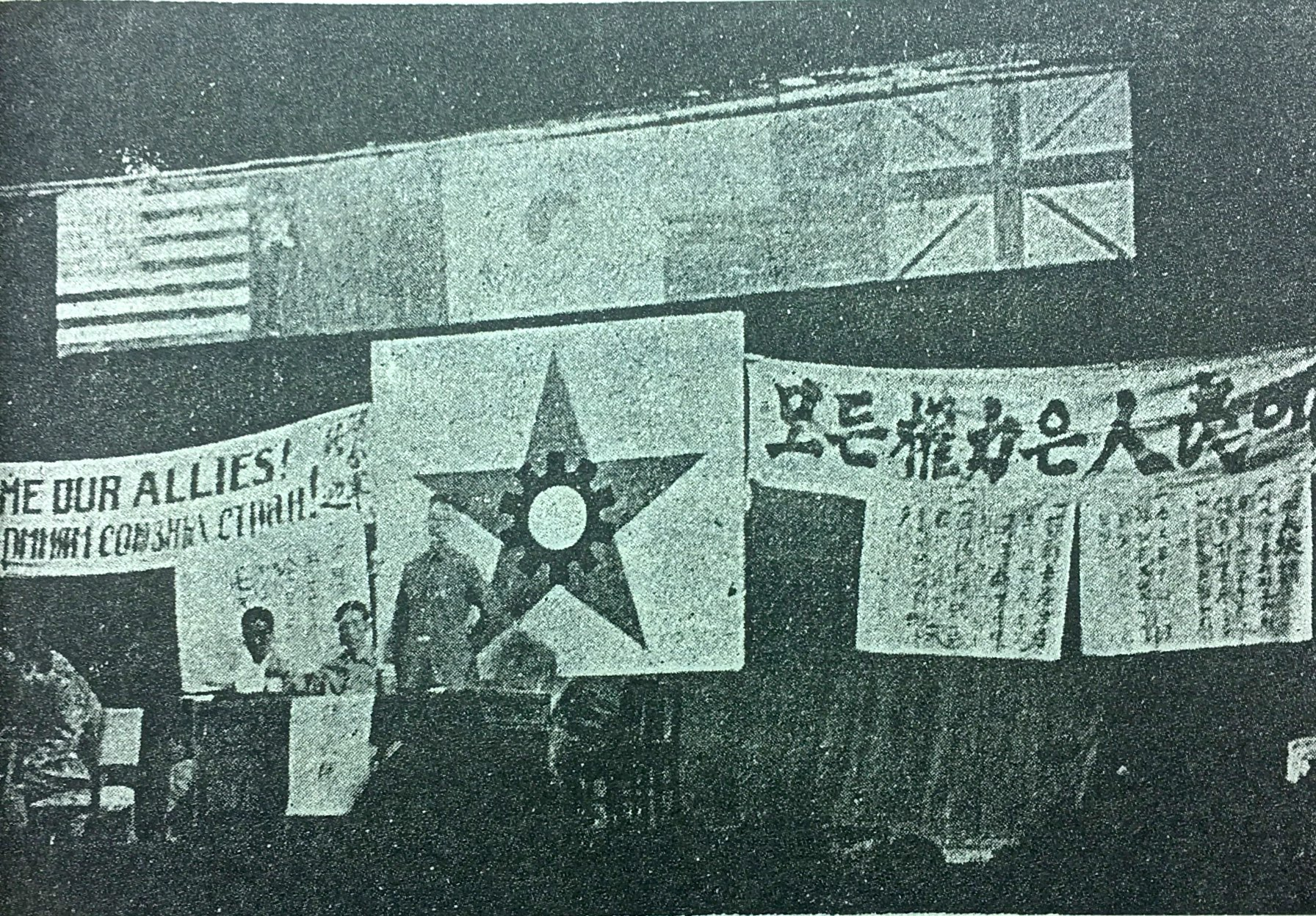
- Established: November 5, 1945
- Dissolved: August 15, 1948
- Location: United States Army Military Government in Korea
- Members: 210000
- Chairman: Ho Song-taek
- Affiliations: Workers' Party of South Korea

Korean name
- Hangul: 조선노동조합전국평의회
- Hanja: 朝鮮勞動組合全國評議會
- RR: Joseon nodongjohap jeonguk pyeonguihoe
- MR: Chosŏn nodongjohap chŏn'guk p'yŏngŭihoe

The Korean Trade Union National Council (Korean: 조선노동조합전국평의회) was a labor union active during the U.S. military government era; it was organised by Ho Song-taek on 5 November 1945, immediately following Korea's liberation. The organisation collaborated with the Workers' Party of South Korea, with which it shared the goal of establishing a working-class government.

Sixteen industrial unions, covering sectors such as metal manufacturing, textiles, construction, railways, electricity, publishing, food processing, mining, timber, shipbuilding, fisheries, general salaried work, transportation, and shipping, participated under the umbrella organisation, and regional councils were organised in eleven cities across the country including Seoul, Gunsan, Incheon, Daejeon, Gwangju and Mokpo.

The organisation faced backlash from nationalist factions for advocating for a unified People's Republic of Korea and supporting the trusteeship plan, and its headquarters were occupied by the Korean Democratic Youth League. It ordered general strikes twice, in 1946 and 1947, leading to an all-out conflict with the nationalist-aligned Federation of Korean Trade Unions (FKTU), a struggle it lost, resulting in its dissolution. On 15 August 1948, the government of the Republic of Korea made the organisation illegal.

== See also ==
- Labor movement of South Korea
- Federation of Korean Trade Unions
- Pak Hon-yong
- South Korean Workers Party
- Daegu October Incident
