= Korean general strike of September 1946 =

1946 nationwide strike in US-occupied South Korea

September 1946 Korean general strike
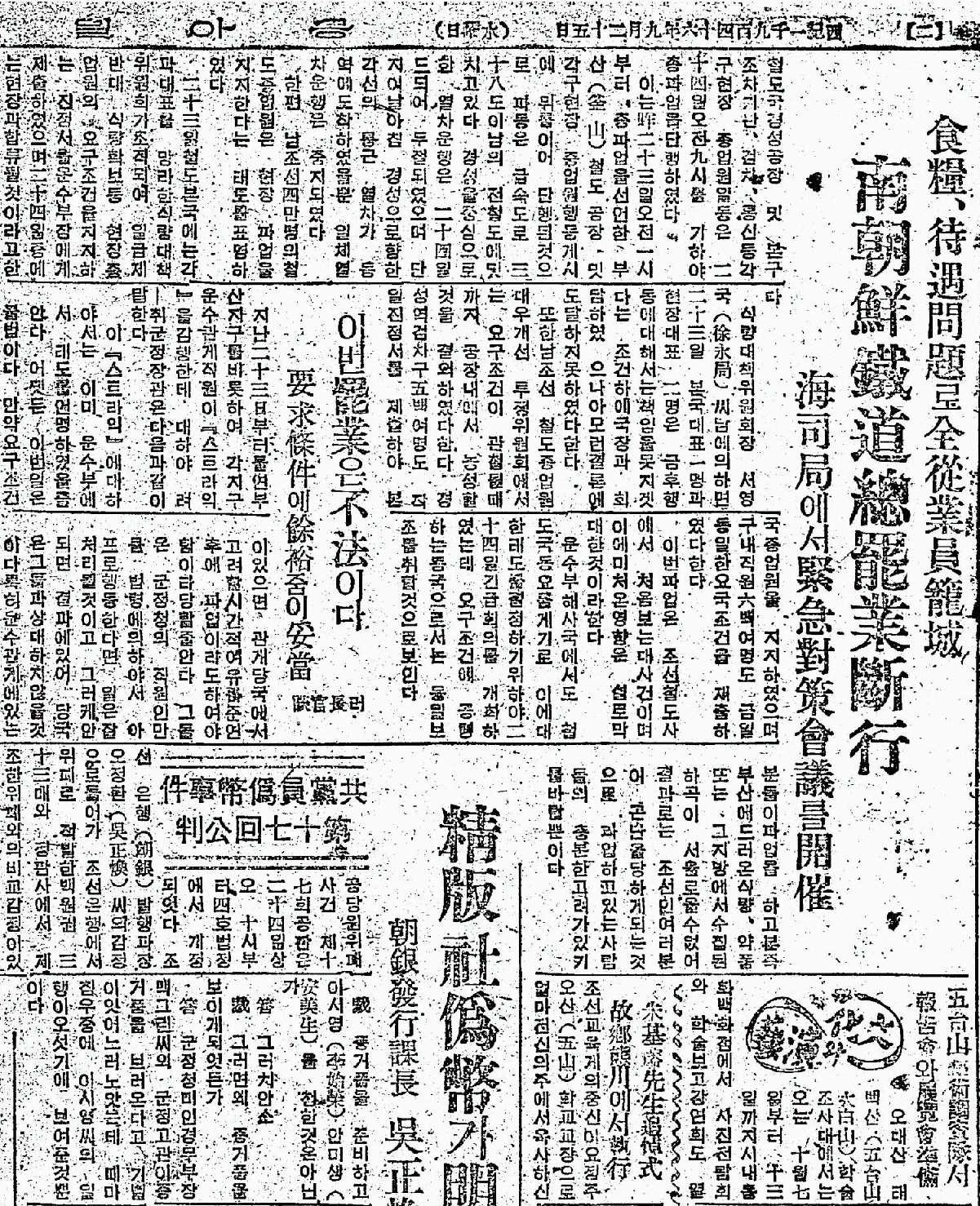
- September 25, 1946 Dong-A Ilbo headlines: "All employees strike due to food and Daewoo issues. Emergency meeting is held at the maritime office South Korea's railway general strike operation. 'The strike is illegal' – Minister of Military Affairs"
- Date: September 23, 1946
- Location: Busan, US-occupied southern Korea
- Caused by: Government oppression of political rivals

Casualties
- Injuries: 100+

The September 1946 Korean general strike was a nationwide strike led by the Communist Party of Korea in which more than 250,000 workers participated. It was fuelled by a growing independence movement after the imposition of the United States Army Military Government in Korea (USAMGIK). Although the strike's events were studied by the South Korean Truth and Reconciliation Commission from 2005 to 2010, they remain disputed.

It is thought to have begun with a strike of railway workers in Busan on September 23, 1946. Led by the Korean Confederation of Trade Unions, other unions joined the strike the following day; this led to the October 1 Daegu Uprising.

== Background ==
After the surrender of Japan on August 15, 1945, at the end of World War II, Korea was divided at the 38th parallel into two zones of occupation. The Soviets administered the northern half, and the U.S. administered the southern half. In 1948, the occupation zones became sovereign states. A communist state was established in the north under the leadership of Kim Il Sung, and a capitalist state was established in the south under the authoritarian leadership of Syngman Rhee. Both governments claimed to be the sole legitimate government of all Korea, and neither accepted the 38th-parallel border as permanent.

Pak Hon-yong, the leader of the Communist Party of Korea, announced the five principles of a joint venture on June 23, 1946. Pak argued against the confiscation and re-distribution of land, and demanded the immediate transfer of government functions from the USAMGIK to the People's Committee. This was rejected by the military government. Although many Koreans wanted independence, the USAMGIK considered anyone opposing its control to be a Communist sympathizer.

On September 6, 1946, the USAMGIK closed three progressive newspapers which it viewed as left-leaning (the People's Daily, the Hyundai Ilbo and the JoongAng Ilbo), and arrested about 10 newspaper executives. The U.S. military police ordered the arrest of the Communist Party of Korea leadership, including Lee Ju-ha, Lee Kang-guk and Pak Hon-yong (who had been hiding in Seoul for several weeks and planned to defect to the north in a hearse).

=== Railway strike ===
The Communist Party of Korea became more aggressive by insisting on a strategy of "new tactics": instigating a public struggle, and launching a general strike. The strike was controlled by the National Council of Korean Workers. The council's first strike began on September 23, by over 7,000 railway workers in Busan. About 40,000 railway workers soon participated in the railway strike, and it quickly spread across the country. Between 250,000 and 300,000 workers struck in all industrial sectors, including metals and chemicals. The general strike began with demands such as rice rationing, wage increases, opposition to dismissal, freedom of the labor movement, and the liberation of democratic figures. Fifteen thousand students from middle and vocational schools in Seoul also took to the streets on September 27, demanding the abolition of colonial education. Some South Korean defense forces (now the Republic of Korea Army) and maritime security forces (now the Republic of Korea Navy) joined the strike, and in Seoul dozens of members of the Communist Party USA in the U.S. military in Korea called for the withdrawal of U.S. troops from Korea. The sixth meeting of the Central Committee of the Provisional People's Committee of North Korea adopted a declaration affirming the strike's legitimacy and supporting striking workers in the south, but the committee did not condone violent struggle.

== USAMGIK response ==
The USAMGIK sent more than 2,000 armed officers to Seoul Railroad, the center of the general strike, on September 30. About 1,000 protestors, including the Korean Confederation of Trade Unions (the present-day Federation of Korean Trade Unions), the Korean People's Office and the National Assembly Press, also joined the eight-hour street battle led by Kim Du-han. Three people were killed, and hundreds were injured.

=== Daegu Uprising ===
An October 1 protest by strikers in Daegu was fired on by police, and one railway worker was killed. Thousands of protestors (including students) carried his body through the city streets the following day, despite police attempts to halt them. The strike then evolved into the broader Autumn Uprising, during which dozens were killed, thousands were arrested, and martial law was imposed.

== See also ==
- Operation Blacklist Forty
- United States Army Military Government in Korea
- Jeju uprising
