= Korea Independence Party =

1928–1970 political party in South Korea

- Founder: Jo So-ang
- Founded: 1928
- Dissolved: 1970
- Headquarters: Shanghai, Republic of China (1928–1945); Seoul, southern and South Korea (1945–1970)
- Armed wing: Korean Independence Army
- Ideology: Conservatism; Korean nationalism; Triequism; Hongik-Inganism; Faction: Social democracy
- Political position: Centre-right to right-wing

- Korea Independence Party
- Hangul: 한국독립당
- Hanja: 韓國獨立黨
- RR: Hanguk dongnipdang
- MR: Han'guk tongniptang

The Korea Independence Party (KIP; Korean: 한국독립당) was a political party in South Korea.

== History ==
The party was established in Shanghai by Kim Ku in 1928, uniting a faction of conservative members of the Provisional Government of the Republic of Korea headed by Kim. When Kim was able to return to Korea in 1945, the KIP began operating in the country. Kim was initially supportive of Syngman Rhee, but a dispute over holding separate elections in South Korea (Kim was opposed, Rhee was for) led to a split and the party did not participate in the 1948 parliamentary elections in South Korea. However, Kim was a candidate in the indirect presidential elections in July 1948, losing heavily to Rhee.

When Kim was assassinated in 1949, the party went into a sharp decline. It participated in the 1950 parliamentary elections, but received only 0.3% of the vote, failing to win a seat. It received the same vote share in the 1960 elections, again failing to win a seat. It nominated Chŏn Chin-han as its candidate for the May 1967 presidential elections; he finished fifth in a field of six candidates with 2.1% of the vote. Despite increasing its vote share to 2.2% in the June 1967 parliamentary elections, the party remained seatless.

In 1970, one year ahead of the presidential elections, the party was absorbed by the New Democratic Party, the Democratic National Party, and others amidst movements toward opposition party unification.

== Election results ==
=== President ===
Election	Candidate	Votes	%	Result
1948	Kim Ku	13	6.67	Not elected
1967	Jeon Jin-han	232,179	2.10	Not elected

=== Vice President ===
Election	Candidate	First round		Second round		Result
Election	Candidate	Votes	%	Votes	%	Result
1948	Kim Ku	65	32.99	62	31.63	Not elected

=== Legislature ===
==== House of Representatives ====
Election	Leader	Votes	%	Seats				Position	Status
Election	Leader	Votes	%	Constituency	Party list	Total	+/–	Position	Status
1950		17,745	0.25			0 / 210	new	10th	Extra-parliamentary
1960		26,649	0.29			0 / 233	Steady	5th	Extra-parliamentary
1963		128,162	1.38	0 / 131	0 / 44	0 / 175	Steady	12th	Extra-parliamentary
1967		240,936	2.22	0 / 131	0 / 44	0 / 175	Steady	6th	Extra-parliamentary

==== House of Councillors ====
Election	Leader	Votes	%	Seats	Position	Status
1960				0 / 58		Extra-parliamentary
