= 1911–12 Army Cadets men's basketball team =

American college basketball season

1911–12 Army Cadets men's basketball
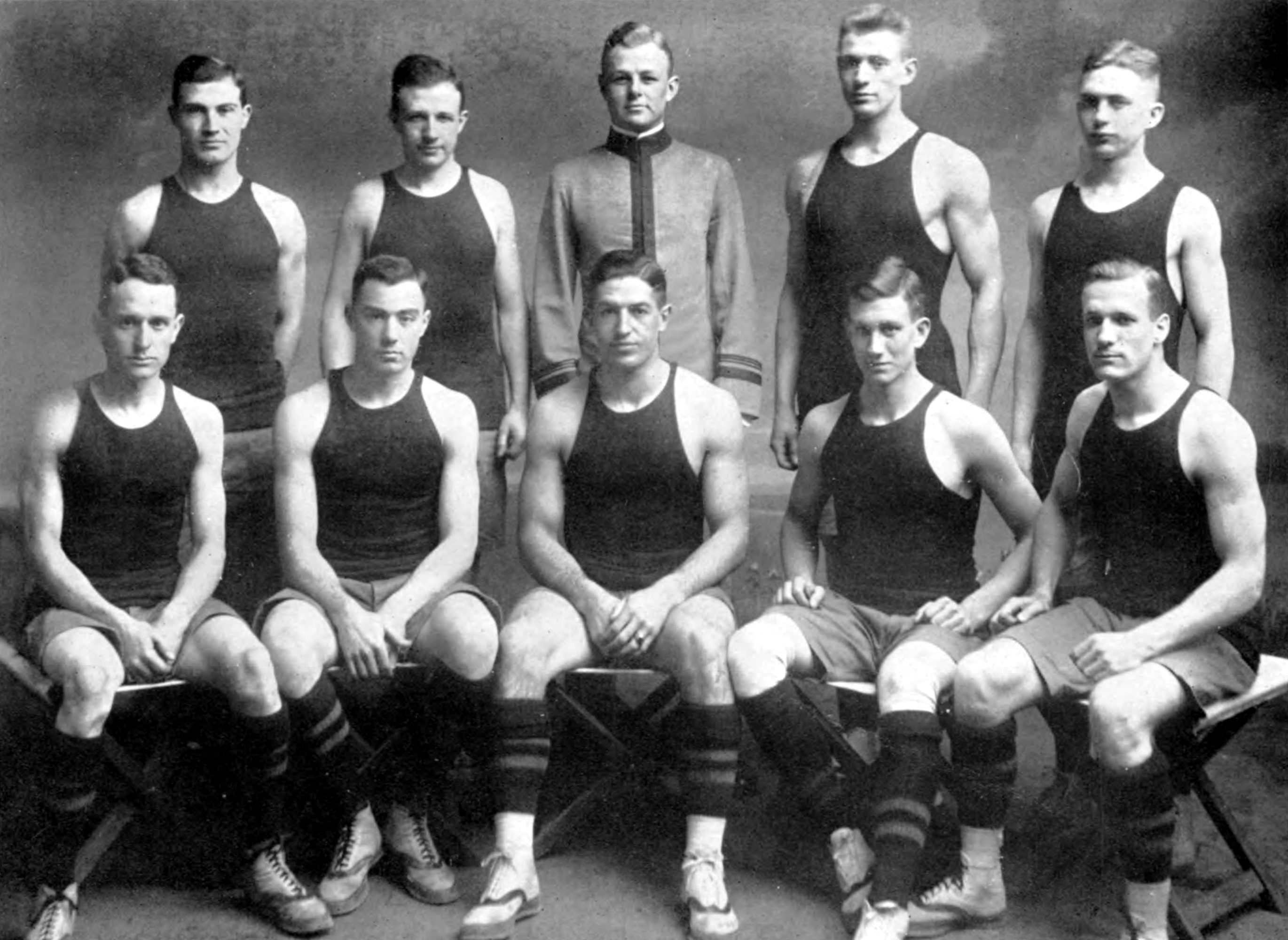
- Conference: Independent
- Record: 8–4
- Head coach: Harvey Higley (1st season)
- Captain: Archibald Arnold

The 1911–12 Army Cadets men's basketball team represented United States Military Academy during the 1911–12 college men's basketball season. The head coach was Harvey Higley, coaching his first season with the Cadets. The team captain was Archibald Arnold.

== Schedule ==
Date time, TV	Opponent	Result	Record	Site city, state
	Lebanon Valley	W 40–21	1–0	West Point, NY
12/17/1911*	Penn State	L 16–30	1–1	West Point, NY
	Crescent A.C.	W 22–13	2–1	West Point, NY
	Union	L 18–22	2–2	West Point, NY
	Princeton	L 26–27	2–3	West Point, NY
	Georgetown	W 28–13	3–3	West Point, NY
	Swarthmore	L 15–17	3–4	West Point, NY
	Manhattan	W 31–27	4–4	West Point, NY
	Syracuse	W 26–22	5–4	West Point, NY
	Oberlin	W 30–20	6–4	West Point, NY
	Fordham	W 48–13	7–4	West Point, NY
	New York University	W 24–12	8–4	West Point, NY
*Non-conference game. (#) Tournament seedings in parentheses.
