= Three Principles of Equality =

Three Principles of Equality 삼균주의 三均主義
- Leader: Cho So-ang
- Founder: Cho So-ang
- Founded: 1931; 95 years ago
- Dissolved: 1950s
- Preceded by: Three Principles of the People
- Membership: Socialist Party; Korea Independence Party
- Ideology: Three Principles of the People; Korean nationalism Korean reunificationism Dangun nationalism Hongik Ingan; Anti-communism; Anti-imperialism; Egalitarianism; Pacifism; Social democracy
- Political position: Centre-right to centre-left Big tent
- National affiliation: Provisional Government of the Republic of Korea (Before 1948), Left-Right Coalition (Since 1946)

Three Principles of Equality or Triequism (Korean: 삼균주의; Hanja: 三均主義) is a republican and nationalist political route established and promoted by South Korean independence activist Cho So-ang since 1918, and was an ideology included in the Constitution of the Provisional Government of the Republic of Korea.

== Origin ==
This ideology was influenced by Chinese politician Sun Yat-sen's Three Principles of the People (삼민주의), Natural rights (천부인권) in Western philosophy, and Christian egalitarianism (만민평등주의).

== Philosophy ==
Three Principles of Equality is the ideology of living an "equality" individuals and individuals, ethnicities and ethnicities, and countries and countries. Triquists value political, economic, and educational equality and support anti-imperialist and pacifist diplomacy.

== See also ==
- Christian democracy
- Korea Independence Party
