= 2017 People's Party South Korean presidential primaries =

The 2017 People's Party presidential primaries were a series of electoral contests organized by the People's Party to determine the nominee for President of South Korea in the 2017 South Korean presidential election. The races took place within all nine provinces and eight metropolitan cities of South Korea between March 25 and April 4, 2017. Regardless of party membership, any South Korean citizen over the age of 19 by the election day (May 9) could vote as long as they showed up on the day of the primary race with a photo ID. These primary results were weighted as 80% of the final result, and the two polls that were conducted by two private poll firms were weighed as 20% of the final result. The candidate who won the absolute majority of the votes would win the nomination, and a runoff ballot was scheduled to be held in case no candidate reached the magic number by the convention day. The People's Party nominee challenged other presidential candidates in the presidential election to fill in the vacancy caused by the impeachment and removal of President Park Geun-hye.

A total of three major candidates entered the race, including National Assemblyman Ahn Cheol-soo of Nowon C, Seoul, former Governor Sohn Hak-kyu of Gyeonggi, and the National Assembly Deputy Speaker Park Joo-sun. In addition, Lawcom, Inc. CEO Yang Pil-seung, tax accountant Kim Won-jo, and businessman Lee Sang-won also sought the party's nomination, but failed to pass the preliminary round, and were not allowed to participate in the primaries. Former Minister of Justice and six-term National Assemblyman Chun Jung-bae, who co-chaired the party along with Ahn in its early days, also announced his bid for the nomination in December 26, 2016, but chose withdraw from the race on March 14, 2017, perhaps due to low polling.

The primaries gained unexpectedly large attention and participation throughout the nation, successfully bringing 184,768 common people to the voting booths, but not as competitive as would have been preferred by the party, as Ahn won every single race by a landslide.

On April 4, Ahn was officially nominated for president by the People's Party and was endorsed by Sohn and Park.

== Candidates ==
=== Ahn Cheol-soo ===
- 2-time Member of the National Assembly (2013–Present)
- Former Co-Leader of the People's Party (2016)
- Former Co-Leader of the New Politics Alliance for Democracy (2014)
- Independent Candidate for 2012 presidential election (2012)

=== Sohn Hak-kyu ===
- 4-time Member of the National Assembly (1993-2002, 2011-12)
- Former Leader of the Democratic Party (2008, 10-11)
- Former Leader of the United New Democratic Party (2008)
- 31st Governor of Gyeonggi Province (2002–06)
- 33rd Minister of Health and Welfare (1996–97)

=== Park Joo-sun ===
- Deputy Speaker of the National Assembly (2016–Present)
- 4-time Member of the National Assembly for (2000–04, 2008-Present)
- Former Member of the Supreme Committee of the People's Party (2016)
- Former Member of the Supreme Committee of the Democratic Party (2008–10)

== Results ==
People's Party Presidential Primaries
	Ahn	Sohn	Park	Total
Jeju (March 25)	1,227 (52.5%)	946 (40.4%)	165 (7.1%)	2,338 (100%)
Gwangju (March 25)	15,976 (59.4%)	4,756 (17.7%)	6,153 (22.9%)	26,885 (100%)
S. Jeolla (March 25)	20,532 (62.3%)	8,544 (25.9%)	3,877 (11.8%)	32,953 (100%)
N. Jeolla (March 26)	21,996 (72.6%)	7,461 (24.6%)	830 (2.7%)	30,287 (100%)
Busan (March 28)	3,341 (79.1%)	619 (14.7%)	263 (6.2%)	4,223 (100%)
Ulsan (March 28)	1,076 (64.4%)	477 (28.6%)	117 (7.0%)	1,670 (100%)
S. Gyeongsang (March 28)	3,144 (73.8%)	679 (15.9%)	435 (10.2%)	4,258 (100%)
N. Gyeongsang (March 30)	2, 663 (68.2%)	813 (20.8%)	426 (10.9%)	3,902 (100%)
Daegu (March 30)	1,896 (70.3%)	432 (16.0%)	370 (13.7%)	2,698 (100%)
Gangwon (March 30)	3,620 (77.1%)	968 (20.6%)	108 (2.3%)	4,696 (100%)
Gyeonggi (April 1)	18,870 (77.4%)	4,944 (20.3%)	552 (2.3%)	24,366 (100%)
Incheon (April 2)	4,889 (72.9%)	1,753 (26.1%)	66 (1.0%)	6,708 (100%)
Seoul (April 2)	25,744 (89.7%)	2,007 (7.0%)	962 (3.4%)	28,713 (100%)
Daejeon (April 4)	3,434 (89.8%)	284 (7.4%)	108 (2.8%)	3,826 (100%)
N. Chungcheong (April 4)	1,532 (69. 2%)	617 (27.9%)	64 (2.9%)	2,213 (100%)
S. Chungcheong (April 4)	3,800 (89.5%)	385 (9.1%)	62 (1.5%)	4,247 (100%)
Sejong (April 4)	187 (93.0%)	11 (5.5%)	3 (1.5%)	201 (100%)
Ballot Total	133,927 (72.7%)	35,696 (19.4%)	14,561 (7.9%)	184,184 (100%)
Poll A (April 3–4)	85.0%	12.5%	2.5%	100%
Poll B (April 3–4)	83.4%	13.2%	3.4%	100%
Poll Total	84.2%	12.85%	2.95%	100%
FINAL	75.01%	18.07%	6.92%	100%
