= Autumn Uprising of 1946 =

Revolt in South Korea against the US military government

- Date: Autumn 1946
- Location: South Korea, mainly in Daegu
- Result: Rebellion suppressed

Parties
| United States Army Military Government in Korea; Right-wing groups: Korean National Youth Association; Northwest Youth League | Communist Party of Korea; National Council of Korean Labour Unions |

Lead figures
| (United States) John R. Hodge | Pak Hon-yong; Kim Jae-bong; Kang Dal-young |

Casualties and losses
- 611 deaths, 7,500 injured, 2,609 arrested

The Autumn Uprising of 1946, also called the 10.1 Daegu Uprising of 1946 (Korean: 대구 10·1 사건; Hanja: 大邱 10·1 事件) was a peasant uprising in South Korea against the policies of the United States Army Military Government in Korea headed by General John R. Hodge and in favor of restoration of power to the people's committees that made up the People's Republic of Korea. The uprising is also sometimes called the Daegu Riot or Daegu Resistance Movement. The Truth and Reconciliation Commission of South Korea uses a neutral name, the Daegu October Incident.

The uprising was preceded by the Korean General Strike in September, in which more than 250,000 workers had participated. The strike was declared illegal by the US Military Government and strikers were attacked by police. On October 1, a protest by strikers in Daegu was fired on by police and a railway worker named Kim Yong-Tae was killed. The following day thousands of protestors, including high school and college students, carried his body through the city streets despite police attempts to halt them. The strike then evolved into the more general Autumn Uprising (or Daegu 10.1 uprising).

The uprising started in Busan, and eventually spread to Seoul, Daegu, Gyeongsangbuk-do, Gyeongsangnam-do, Chungcheongnam-do, and Jeollanam-do. The uprising finally ended in mid-November. The demands expressed by protesters during the uprising included better working conditions, higher wages, larger food rations, the right to organize, and the release of political prisoners.

The United States Military Government responded by mobilizing strikebreakers, police, and right-wing youth groups; these were accompanied by U.S. troops and tanks following a declaration of martial law. The USMG succeeded in putting down the uprising, which had resulted in the deaths of 92 policemen, 163 civil workers, 116 civilians, and 240 rioters. 2,609 people were arrested by the police and military. Some analysts say that the uprising, which was in part a reaction to the October elections for the South Korean Interim Legislative Assembly, organized by the United States Military Government, was a better indicator of public opinion than the election itself.

The defeat of the uprising is considered to be a turning point in establishing political control over Korea, as the people's committees and the National Council of Korean Labour Unions were weakened in the suppression. To the Americans, the Autumn Harvest Rebellion added new urgency to the effort to find some formula for unifying the two occupation zones of Korea under an elected government.

In 2010, the Truth and Reconciliation Commission presented its findings. There were 60 victims, whose families it suggested the government should provide compensation for, and around 7,500 other people who suffered during the incident. Some victims were arrested and tortured, then police and extreme right wing groups damaged or confiscated their homes and property. The families of the victims had to endure the shame of being viewed as criminals.

== Background ==
It is called the October Uprising, the October 1 Incident, the Yeongnam riots, and the October riots, depending on the historical point of view. From an advocate standpoint, it is called the October Uprising, a criticism call it as Yeongnam riots and October riots, and from a neutral standpoint it is called the October 1 Incident. From the perspective of asserting the agitation and initiative of the Communist Party of Korea, it is sometimes referred to as the October riot. In the past, the terms of the October riot, the Yeongnam riot, and the October riot were used interchangeably, and officially the term was referred to as the more neutral October 1 Incident.

After liberation, Koreans under the USAMGIK US military command in South Korea faced starvation due to the failure of USAMGIK's rice ration policy. The hunger in Daegu, where there were outbreaks of cholera during this period, was particularly severe. After 2,000 cholera cases occurred in Daegu and Gyeongsangbuk-do, the government blocked off Daegu without taking proper measures for treatment, as an effort to prevent transmission. Vehicles and people could not cross the city boundary, so the supply of crops and daily necessities was cut off. Above all, rice was scarce.

In addition, police from the former pro-Japanese government who became national police after the war robbed farmers of rice like they had when Korea was under Japanese rule. Citizens' anger against pro-Japanese policemen grew, and the police retaliated against them. In the midst of this, the public sentiment in Daegu and Gyeongsnabuk-do was very chaotic.

Meanwhile, in May 1946, amidst a case of counterfeit bills by Jung Pan-sa, USAMGIK announced the 'illegalization of communist activities' and issued a mass arrest order for communist party officials. The forces of the Communist Party of Korea of Pak Hon-yong (Hangul: 박헌영, Hanja: 朴憲永) adopted more extreme methods, called 'new tactics' saying, "I will fight against USAMGIK". Subsequently, the Communist Party and Jeon-pyeong (조선노동조합전국평의회; 朝鮮勞動組合全國評議會) agitated the workers and held a general strike, led by railroad and transportation workers, in September 1946.

The September general strike spread across the country, starting with the strike of railroad workers in the Busan area. In this way, the Communist Party and Jeon-pyeong struck head-on against the USAMGIK in earnest. The general strike in September quickly spread across the country, and workers went on strike. The USAMGIK attempted to use the national police and anti-communist youth groups to crush the strike, but there was an unexpected situation here. When the police fired on strikes by workers in Daegu, the incident developed in response.

== Inside Yeongnam ==
=== Daegu ===
During the Communist Party of Korea's September strike, the Jeonpyeong leadership in Daegu began a general strike from September 23, and strikes and demonstrations continued until October 1. However, on the evening of October 1, during a protest in front of the Daegu Metropolitan City Hall to prepare countermeasures against hunger, civilians named Hwang Mal-Yong and Kim Jong-Tae were shot and killed when the police fired. When the disbanded crowd heard the gunfire, they became angry and began to gather in front of the headquarters of the Daegu City Fighter Committee, and thousands of people gathered. The police fired again to disperse the crowd, and in response, the crowd attacked the police, resulting in casualties.

The next morning, October 2 when they heard that two civilians were shot and killed by the police firing, workers began to gather in the city, and ordinary citizens and students joined the protests. Surrounded by a crowd of about 10,000 people, the chief of the Daegu Police Department declared himself disarmed and handed the keys to the detention center to release political prisoners. Workers under the control of the leadership of the Korean Communist Party tried to take the police power in an orderly manner. At this time, however, excited crowds on one side of the street started throwing stones at the police, and police officers in the corner fired guns at the crowd, killing 17 protesters.

On the occasion of the 'incident' on October 2, the strike developed into a violent form as it was combined with the mass struggle. The Daegu City Struggle Committee tried to unfold the strike struggle within a legal framework and to prevent the struggle from unfolding violently. However, as the public hatred for the police soared, spontaneously attacking and destroying the houses of police and military officials.

The crowd robbed the rich and the homes of the former pro-Japanese, brought necessities and food, piled them up on the street, and distributed them to people in need. Places such as general stores and banks rarely suffered damage. The reason why the policemen were assaulted or killed was that most of them were pro-Japanese police, who have harassed Koreans since the Japanese colonial period.

Even the Daegu Department of Health, a doctor's meeting in Daegu, issued a warning to the police, saying "First, police officers should stop firing on citizens. Second, refuse to treat the injured officers who fired on compatriots."

The USAMGIK declared martial law in Daegu at 7 pm on October 2, the next day, and mobilized the US military. So it seemed that order had been restored externally in Daegu. However, as the protests expanded to Gyeongsan County, Seongju County, and Yeongcheon County near Daegu, the conflict between civilians and USAMGIK in Gyeongsangbuk-do did not stop but continued to occur. Afterward, in the process of suppressing civilian protests in the Gyeongbuk region, the conflict expanded nationwide and continued until the end of 1946.

=== North Gyeongsang Province ===
The disturbance seemed to be calming around October 2. However, the incident spread throughout Gyeongbuk as people around the incident moved to other areas to protest and riot. In Yeongcheon, 10,000 protesters raided and burned down the police station. Also, they killed military officers, police officers, and officials. (October 3) When the police cheerleaders arrived, the order in the region was restored, but police officers and right-wing youth members looted the homes of those involved in the incident and harassed them. Here in Yeongcheon alone, over 1,200 houses were burned down and destroyed, resulting in 40 deaths, 43 serious injuries, and 1 billion won in damage. In Seonsan-gun (now Gumi), the instigators did not come down, but a crowd of 2,000 people led by Park Sang-hee (ko: 박상희, Hanja: 朴相熙) attacked the Gumi Police Station, paralyzing the function of the police station, and hung a signboard of the Sunsan People's Committee Security Station to manage the area. They imprisoned the police and right-wing personnel, and destroyed the property of the wealthy.

In Yecheon-gun, police were dispatched in advance to prevent protests, but they failed due to a conflict with civilians, and a crowd of about 1,000 people raided the police station and even engaged in a battle. Local order could not be restored until the arrival of the US military. However, even after that, attacks at the police station continued, causing the police to be injured and the arsenal to be taken, and there was no police even in the outskirts. On the other hand, in Yeongil-gun, a missionary was killed by a civilian attack.

A similar event occurred in Chilgok. A crowd of 500 people attacked Yakmok police substation and killed three policemen by tying them to a pole. In Waegwan, 2,000 residents attacked the Waegwan Police Station along with protests, and four additional policemen were killed. Before the incident, the Waegwan area had very strong resistance to the order to collect rice, but the anger of the Waegwan residents was so great that Jang Seok-Han, the chief of the police at the time, was killed by splitting his head from the top to the bottom with his face being mutilated.

In addition, incidents occurred in Dalseong, Goryeong, Seongju, Gunwi, Uiseong, Gimcheon, Gyeongsan, Cheongdo, Gyeongju, Yeongdeok, Andong, Sangju, Mungyeong, Yeongju, and Bonghwa, and about 773,200 people participated in the incident. Incidents in the Gyeongbuk region unfolded using various strengths (classified as non-occurring/low strength/medium strength/high strength/maximum strength) and tactics (first strike, raid on police station, use of market day, use of balance of power between political and ideological forces, use of rice paddy area with high ripple), followed by harsh retaliation by the police.

=== South Gyeongsang Province ===
The Gyeongnam region is the place where the general strike began in September, which was the start of the Daegu 10.1 incident. From October 7 to 14, several uprisings took place in various places. However, unlike other regions, the September general strike was very passive and moderate, and even during the October incident, there were decentralized and isolated events. (Even so, incidents have occurred in many areas.)

In the Gyeongnam region, the first incident occurred in Tongyeong. A crowd of 4000–5000 people took control of the town and beat the police and stole weapons. Several branch offices were attacked in Changnyeong as well, and crowds attempted to occupy police stations and county offices. In Masan, on the 6th and 7th, fierce clashes between the crowd and the military and police resulted in 13 deaths. In the Ulsan area, the office was destroyed and the police station was besieged, but with the help of the Eung-Won police(police who came to Jeju Island from land) and the US military, they were soon retaken, and some of the crowd escaped by boat. In Busan, where there was a passive incident, a bloody conflict occurred on the 9th, killing 24 people.

== Outside Yeongnam ==
=== Chungcheong Province ===
The incident in Gyeongsang-do moved to Chungcheong-do and spread. In Chung cheong-do, the incident mainly occurred in the northwestern region. Civilian unrest occurred on October 4 and 7 in Chungbuk and on October 17 to 19 in Chungnam. On October 17, a police station was attacked in Dangjin, occupying public facilities, cutting communication lines, and blasting bridges. Starting with that incident, the northwestern part of Chungcheongnam-do was caught up in the incident. In Hongseong, police fired indiscriminately at crowds protesting for rice and land, killing four people. The demonstration also occurred in Yesan, Seonsan, and Cheonan, threatening the police and right-wing forces.

There were relatively no incidents in Chungbuk. One policeman died in Cheongju, and a crowd of 300–400 people in Yeongdong-gun tried to attack the police station, but it failed. The reason the scale of the incident was relatively small in the Chungbuk region was that the moderate left-wing of Cheongju, the center of Chungbuk, was quite dominant. (Some moderates have spread flyers saying "Extreme communists are unacceptable," and ousted the extremists.)

=== Seoul, Gyeonggi Province, Hwanghae Province, Gangwon Province ===
As the incident subsided in Chungcheong-do, protests broke out in Gyeonggi-do and Hwanghae-do provinces. In Gwangju, Gyeonggi-do, they fought to kill the police and burn the police station. In Gaepung, the chief of police was murdered, and most of the branch offices were attacked over two days. In Paju, a riot was planned and discovered in advance, and all the leaders were arrested.

Protests took place in Seoul as well. On the 3rd, a crowd of 1,200 people joined the students and sang a song in front of the city hall, and at noon on the 21st, 2,000 people gathered at the Jongno intersection and advanced to Dongdaemun. However, in front of the Christian Youth Hall, the crowd was disbanded by the mass fire of the armed police, and a boxer passing by was murdered. On that day, protests broke out at Jongno 5-ga and a bomb exploded at Seoul Station.

In addition, demonstrations and raids were followed in Incheon, Yeonbaek, and Jangdan areas, and incidents occurred from October 20 to 22 (excluding Incheon). Between October 29 and the first week of November, protests broke out on the east coast of Gangwon-do. In Gangwon, thousands of crowds attacked the police station in Hoengseong, and in Mukho, residents attacked the police station as a result of the deaths while investigating the protests. In Gangneung, the police were beaten and communications were cut off, and in Pyeongchang, the left-wing forces with weapons and the police broke out. In Samcheok, there was a disturbance between the left and the right-wing due to the mine. The case in Gangwon-do is characterized by the fact that it mainly took place near the east coast.

=== Honam ===
The series of events that were likely to sweep across South Korea stopped from October 23 to 28. The USAMGIK and the right-wing forces judged that Left-wing extremists are waiting for the harvest season and the military and police who want to collect rice, and they think the USAMGIK will focus on agitation that it has no right to collect rice.

However, this was a period during which the left was preparing for work in Jeolla-do. For that reason, the incidents in Jeollanam-do, in particular, were as big and violent as in Gyeongsangbuk-do in the early days of the incident.

Between October 29 to November 4, a large-scale uprising took place in the north-central region of Jeollanam-do, centered on Naju and Hwasun. From October 30, miners in Hwasun attempted to march toward Gwangju. On the next day, the 31st, even women and children marched together. On November 4, the miners fought fiercely against the US military and the police.

== Damage ==
As the October incident expanded to a nationwide protest, the police alone could not suppress it. For this reason, the help of anti-communist right-wing personnel, such as the US military and the South Korean Defense Guard, as well as the Korean Democratic Party, the Korean National Youth Association, the Northwest Youth League, and the White Shirts Society, were needed in each region. As a result, several people involved in various anti-communist right-wing organizations, including the Korean National Youth Association, the White Shirts Society, and the Northwest Youth League, inflicted repeatedly terrorism or property damage on the grounds of arresting the leftists who participated in the protests. (To avoid this, some leftists and civilians even fled to the mountains.)

The exact size of the incident was unknown due to a lack of records. According to one report, the total damage to Gyeongsangbuk-do was 400 million won. The number of casualties on the police side, including the security forces (police assistants and village vigilantes), killed 80 people, missing, 145 people were abducted, and 96 people were injured. The damage to right-wing and civilians was counted as 24 deaths, 41 injuries, and 21 kidnappings.

== Contemporary reactions ==
Pak Hon-young referred to this incident as the 'October People's Uprising,' and evaluated it as the three Great People's Uprisings of Joseon along with the Donghak Peasant Revolution and the March 1st Movement'. Communist Party of Korea has never officially instigated protests, local Communist Party members were killed or taken to jail while fighting at the forefront of self-sustaining demonstrators in every town.

On the other hand, the right-wing criticized the case vigorously, and the Korea Democratic Party, in particular, criticized it, saying, 'This strike struggle was caused by the incitement of Pak Hon-young's gang.' Criticism about this incident poured out from within the left-wing. Representatives of the nine left-wing political parties (Jeong Baek (정백) and Lee Young), excluding the Communist Party of Korea, held an emergency meeting and fiercely criticized the fight as 'adventurism by the Communist Party of Pak Hon-yong.

The Left-right Coalition Movement put forward Yangbi theory (양비론), which was caused by the opposition to the police. At the end of October, Lyuh Woon-hyung and Kim Kyu-sik criticized the military administration by saying "The'October 1 incident' occurred due to antipathy against the police, the presence of chinilpa in the military administration, corruption of some Korean officials, and agitation of destructors." in a meeting with Major General Brown of the US military administration. Kim Kyu-sik urged them to refrain from saying, 'These actions will only hinder independence by undermining the prestige of the Korean people internationally.'

== Results and significance ==
=== Results ===
As the uprising spread throughout South Korea, the USAMGIK actively responded to preliminary detention of leaders of the People's Committees and farmers' associations in regions where the uprising was expected, or organized suppression organizations in each region. As the fighting area was widespread and the US military and police were dispersed, the youth and other right-wing were actively mobilized for suppression. When an uprising broke out in the region, the US military and police were immediately dispatched to suppress it. The uprising developed violently and the suppression method was ruthless, causing many casualties. In particular, the police and right-wing figures were intensively attacked in the course of the uprising, and there was much retaliation by the police and right-wing. In addition, many fatalities and injuries occurred due to terrorism by the right-wing, and material damage was significant.

After the uprising broke out, representatives of the USAMGIK and Centrism forces held the ROK-US joint talks (한미공동회담) to find out the cause of the uprising and come up with countermeasures. The ROK-US joint talks revealed that the cause of the uprising was people's hostility toward the police, the existence of chinilpa within the military government, corruption of some Korean officials, and agitation that hindered South Korea's maximum welfare. As a countermeasure, it was recommended to the USAMGIK to punish chinilpa within the military government. As a result of the uprising, leaders of popular movement groups, including farmers' associations and people's committees, were arrested or evacuated, greatly weakening the capacity of the left-wing, including these organizations. On the other hand, the right-wing formed an organization in the wake of the uprising and strengthened their capabilities.

=== Significance ===
The October Uprising is an event that occurred in the process of establishing a modern nation-state after liberation and is a historical event with the character of the first mass uprising in USAMGIK. The October Uprising was the first large-scale popular uprising that took place after liberation and showed its influence to spread throughout the country. In particular, the October Uprising is a historical event amid the change of the US Military Justice policy from the left-right cooperative route to the Korean people policy in the state of the collapse of the Joint Micro-Committee.

== See also ==
- Operation Blacklist Forty
- United States Army Military Government in Korea
- Jeju uprising
- Yeosu–Suncheon rebellion
