= Laboring People's Party =

1947–1949 political party in South Korea

Laboring People's Party 근로인민당
- Leader: Lyuh Woon-hyung
- Founded: 1947
- Dissolved: 1949 (South Korea)
- Preceded by: People's Party of Korea
- Headquarters: South Korea (until 1949)
- Ideology: Social democracy Democratic socialism Korean reunification Korean nationalism Progressivism
- Political position: Centre-left to left-wing

The Laboring People's Party (Korean: 근로인민당; Hanja: 勤勞人民黨) of Korea was a centre-left to left-wing political party in South Korea and North Korea.

Under the leadership of Lee Yong, the party continued to operate in North Korea where it participated in elections. It won seats in the Supreme People's Assembly at least in 1957. Two of its delegates were purged in the aftermath of the August Faction Incident sometime between 1957 and 1959.

== See also ==
- Democratic Independent Party
- Hong Myong-hui
- Progressivism in South Korea
