= John R. Hodge =

American army officer (1893–1963)

John Reed Hodge
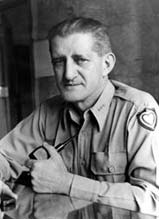

Military Governor of Korea
- In office 8 September 1945 – 15 August 1948
- Deputy: Archibald V. Arnold; Archer L. Lerch; William F. Dean; Charles G. Helmick
- Preceded by: Nobuyuki Abe (as Governor-General of Korea)
- Succeeded by: Syngman Rhee (as President of the Republic of Korea)

Personal details
- Born: 12 June 1893 Golconda, Illinois, U.S.
- Died: 12 November 1963 (aged 70) Washington, D.C., U.S.
- Awards: Army DSM (3); Navy DSM; Legion of Merit; Air Medal; Purple Heart

Military service
- Allegiance: United States
- Branch/service: U.S. Army
- Years of service: 1917–1953
- Rank: General
- Unit: Infantry Branch
- Commands: 43rd Infantry Division; Americal Division; XXIV Corps; V Corps; US 3rd Army
- Battles/wars: World War I; World War II; Guadalcanal Campaign; Operation Cartwheel; Solomons campaign; Bougainville Campaign; Philippines Campaign; Battle of Leyte; Battle of Okinawa; Operation Blacklist Forty; Korean War

General John Reed Hodge (12 June 1893 – 12 November 1963) was an American military officer of the United States Army. Hodge commanded Operation Blacklist Forty in 1945. He served as the governor of the American military government in Korea from 1945 to 1948.

== Early life and career ==
Born in Golconda, Illinois, Hodge attended Southern Illinois Teachers College and the University of Illinois. After completing an officer indoctrination program at the U.S. Army Officer Candidate School at Fort Sheridan, he received a direct commission in the Army as an infantry second lieutenant in 1917. He served in World War I in France and Luxembourg.

Remaining in the Army following the end of the war, he taught military science at Mississippi State University from 1921 to 1925 and graduated from the Infantry School in 1926. After a posting to Hawaii, he graduated from the Command and General Staff School, from where he graduated in 1934, the Army War College, and the Air Corps Tactical School.

== World War II ==
At the beginning of World War II, Hodge served as chief of staff of the VII Corps under the command of Major General Robert C. Richardson Jr., located in California as a part of the Western Defense Command. He was promoted to the temporary rank of brigadier general in June 1942 and transferred to the 25th Infantry Division in Hawaii, where he succeeded Gilbert R. Cook as the assistant division commander (ADC) and deputy of Major General J. Lawton Collins.

The 25th Division was sent overseas to Guadalcanal in November 1942. Hodge stayed with 25th Division until April 1943, when he was promoted to the rank of major general and transferred to the temporary command of the 43rd Infantry Division, where he relieved Major General John H. Hester, who was exhausted from combat. Hodge commanded the 43rd Division during the combats in Northern Solomons and was decorated with the Army Distinguished Service Medal for his service.

After three months of service with the 43rd Division, Hodge was given command of the "Americal" Infantry Division on the Fiji Islands. He subsequently commanded the division during the Bougainville campaign.

Hodge was appointed commanding officer of the newly activated XXIV Corps in Hawaii and participated in the Battle of Leyte within Philippines Campaign and later in Battle of Okinawa. He received the Army Distinguished Service Medals for each of these campaigns. Hodge was promoted to the temporary rank of lieutenant general in June 1945.

== Later career ==
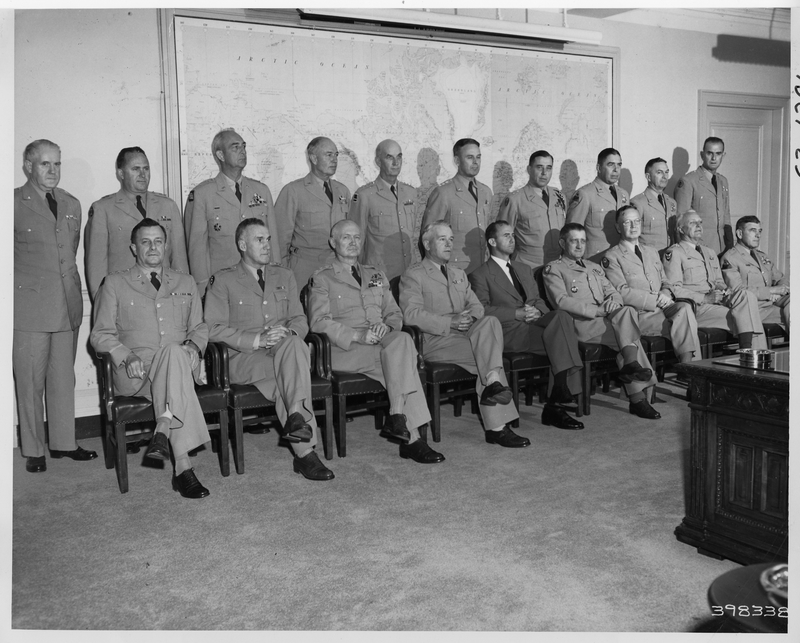
Army commanders in the United States and certain overseas commanders meet with Secretary of the Army Frank Pace and General J. Lawton Collins, Army Chief of Staff, in the Pentagon in routine sessions, 5 June 1952. Lieutenant General John R. Hodge is sat fourth from the right, between Secretary Pace (left) and Lieutenant General Henry Aurand (right)

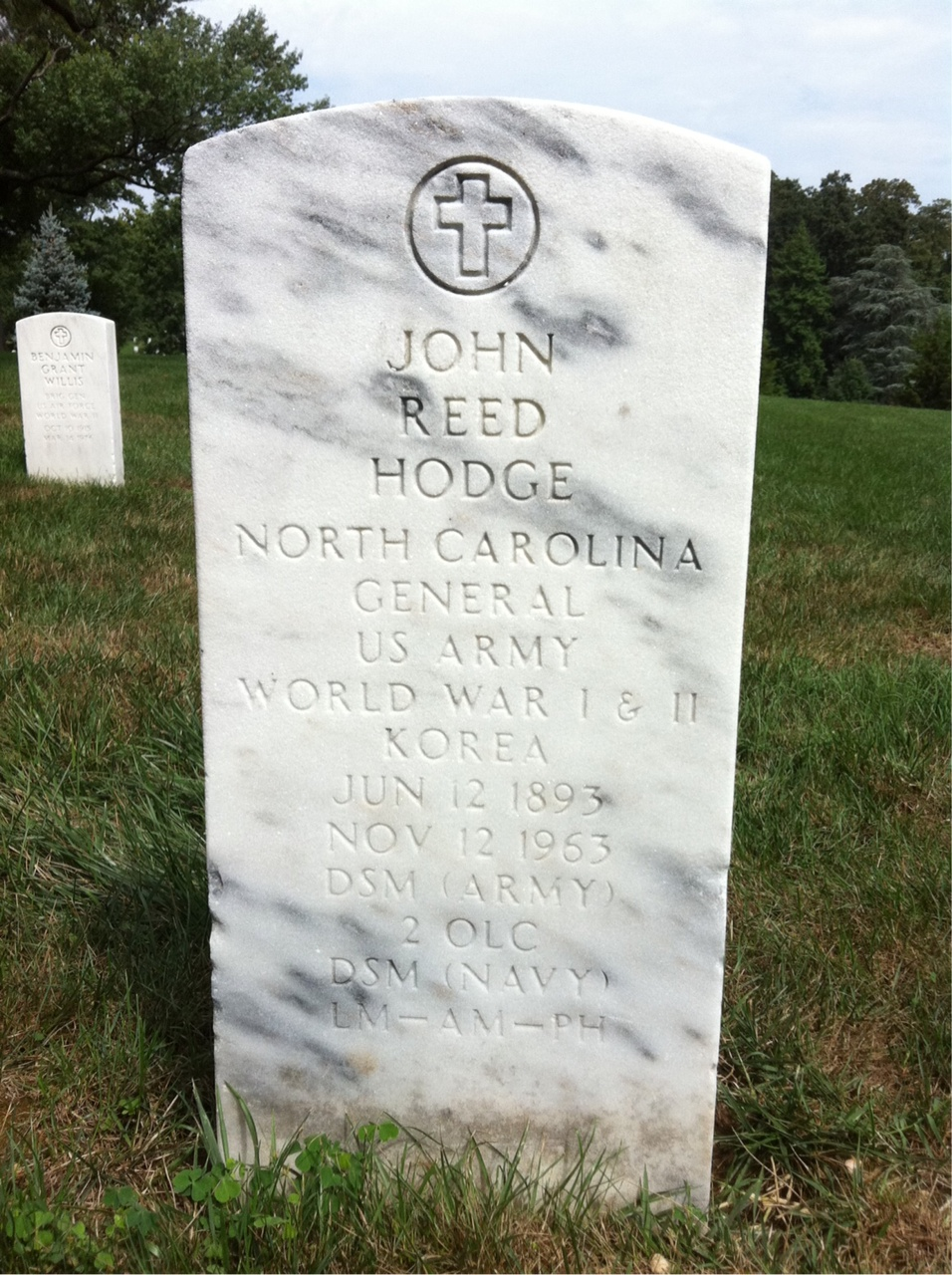
The grave of General John R. Hodge at Arlington National Cemetery

From 1945 to 1948, Hodge was the commanding general of United States Army Forces in Korea (USAFIK). He took his corps to Korea under orders of Douglas MacArthur, landing at Incheon on 9 September 1945. He was the commanding officer receiving the surrender of all Japanese forces in Korea south of the 38th parallel. Hodge refused to recognize the People's Republic of Korea and its People's Committees, and outlawed it on 12 December 1945.

Hodge then returned to Fort Bragg, North Carolina, to command V US Corps from 1948 to 1950. After the retirement of Lieutenant General Alvan C. Gillem, Hodge was named the commanding general of the US Third Army.

Hodge was promoted to general on 5 July 1952. His final assignment was as Chief of Army Field Forces from 8 May 1952 until he retired from military service on 30 June 1953.

General Hodge died in Washington, D.C., in 1963, at the age of 70.

== Decorations ==
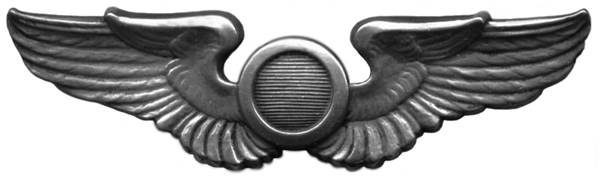

US Army Air Forces Aircraft Observer Badge
1st Row	Army Distinguished Service Medal with two Oak Leaf Clusters		Navy Distinguished Service Medal	
2nd Row	Legion of Merit	Air Medal	Purple Heart	World War I Victory Medal with three battle clasps
3rd Row	Army of Occupation of Germany Medal	American Defense Service Medal	American Campaign Medal	Asiatic-Pacific Campaign Medal with four service stars and Arrowhead device
4th Row	World War II Victory Medal	Army of Occupation Medal	National Defense Service Medal	Philippine Liberation Medal with two stars

== Dates of rank ==
Insignia	Rank	Component	Date
	Second lieutenant	Officers Reserve Corps	15 August 1917
	Second lieutenant	Regular Army	26 October 1917
	First lieutenant	Regular Army	15 May 1918
	Captain	National Army	12 October 1918
	Captain	Regular Army	1 July 1920
	Major	Regular Army	1 August 1935
	Lieutenant colonel	Regular Army	18 August 1940
	Colonel	Army of the United States	17 December 1941
	Brigadier general	Army of the United States	23 June 1942
	Major general	Army of the United States	28 April 1943
	Lieutenant general	Army of the United States	6 June 1945
	Brigadier general	Regular Army	1 March 1946
	Major general	Regular Army	6 April 1947
	General	Army of the United States	5 July 1952
	General	Regular Army, Retired	30 June 1953

== See also ==
- History of South Korea
- Military history of the United States
- Jang Il-soon, who opposed Hodge's appointment to lead the United States Army Military Government in Korea

== Bibliography ==
- Taaffe, Stephen R. (2013). Marshall and His Generals: U.S. Army Commanders in World War II. Lawrence, Kansas: University Press of Kansas. ISBN 978-0-7006-1942-9. OCLC 840162019.

Military offices
Preceded by Edmund Sebree	Commanding General Americal Division; 1943–1944	Succeeded by Robert B. McClure
Preceded by John H. Hester	Commanding General 43rd Infantry Division; July–August 1943	Succeeded by Leonard F. Wing
Preceded by Newly activated organization	Commanding General XXIV Corps; 1944–1948	Succeeded by John B. Coulter
Preceded by Stafford L. Irwin	Commanding General V Corps; 1948–1950	Succeeded by John W. Leonard
Preceded by Alvan Cullom Gillem Jr.	Commanding General Third Army; 1950–1952	Succeeded by William A. Beiderlinden
