= Archibald Vincent Arnold =

United States Army general (1889–1973)

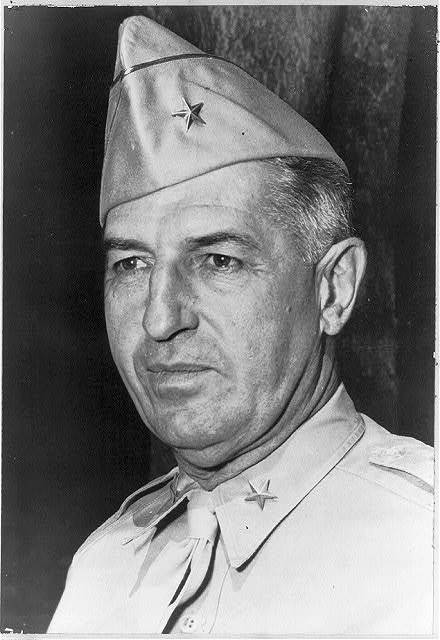
- Archibald Vincent Arnold, pictured here as a brigadier general
- Born: February 24, 1889; Collinsville, Connecticut, U.S.
- Died: January 4, 1973 (aged 83); Southern Pines, North Carolina, U.S.
- Military career
- Allegiance: United States
- Branch: United States Army
- Service years: 1912–1948
- Rank: Major general
- Service number: 0-3395
- Units: Infantry Branch; Field Artillery Branch
- Commands: 17th Field Artillery Regiment; 69th Field Artillery Brigade; 7th Infantry Division
- Conflicts: World War I; World War II; Aleutian Islands campaign; Philippines campaign; Battle of Okinawa; Operation Blacklist Forty
- Awards: Army Distinguished Service Medal (2); Silver Star; Legion of Merit; Air Medal; Commendation Ribbon

Archibald Vincent Arnold (February 24, 1889 – January 4, 1973) was a major general in the United States Army officer who commanded the 7th Infantry Division during World War II.

== Early life and career ==
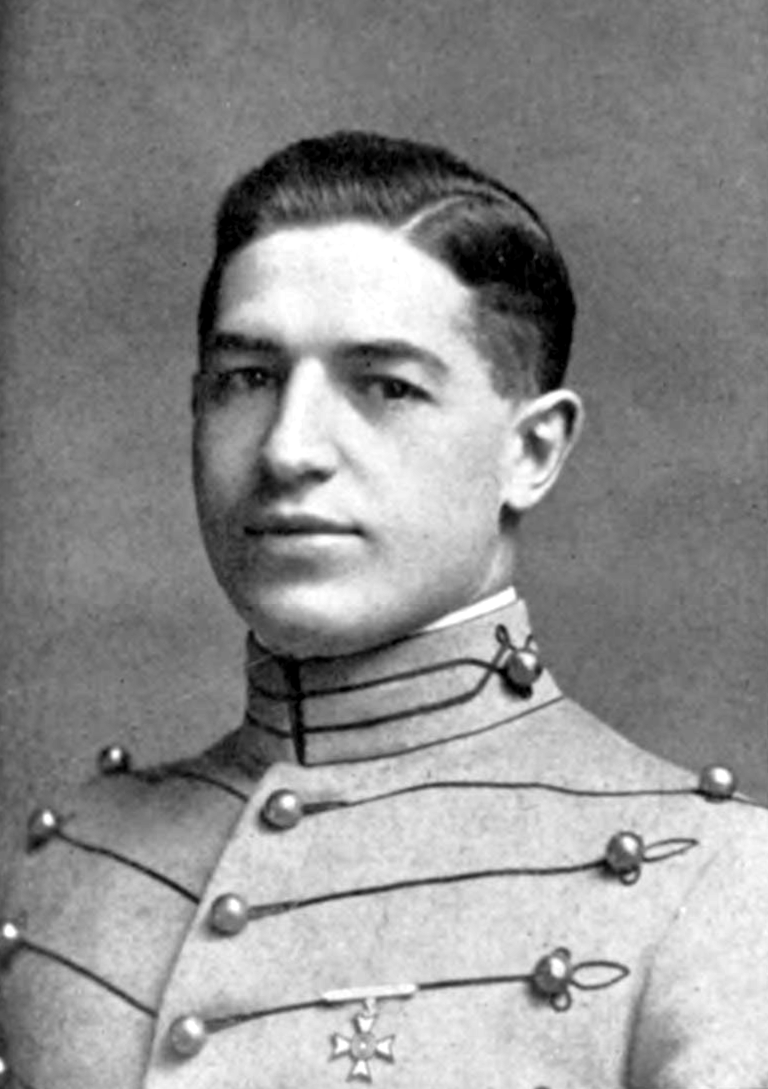
At West Point in 1912

Arnold was born in Collinsville, Connecticut on February 24, 1889. He attended United States Military Academy at West Point, where he was an All-American football player. After graduating from West Point in June 1912, Arnold was commissioned into the United States Army Infantry Branch.

== World War II ==
After service in World War I, he attended the United States Army Command and General Staff College from 1928 to 1930.

At the beginning of World War II, Arnold was Chief Staff of the I Corps and commander of the 69th Field Artillery Brigade and 44th Division.

Arnold was the second-in-command of the 7th Infantry Division during the Battle of the Aleutian Islands. Arnold continued serving as second-in-command of the 7th until 1944.

Arnold was the commanding general of the 7th Division during the Philippines Campaign and the Battle of Okinawa. He received the Army Distinguished Service Medal for his World War II service.

After the war, Arnold was made the military governor of Korea from 1945 to 1946. He served as principal American delegate to the US-USSR Joint Committee that convened in Seoul, Korea, in January 1946, and then to the US-USSR Joint Commission that followed in April 1946. The primary task of the Joint Commission was to reunite North and South Korea after it was divided by the State War Navy Coordinating Committee (SWNCC) in 1945. He retired from the Army in 1948.

== Personal life ==
Arnold married Margaret Treat Arnold.

== Honors and awards ==
=== Distinguished Service Medal ===
==== Citation ====
SYNOPSIS: Major General Archibald Vincent Arnold (ASN: 0-3395), United States Army, was awarded the Army Distinguished Service Medal for exceptionally meritorious and distinguished services to the Government of the United States, in a duty of great responsibility as Commanding General of the 7th Infantry Division, during the period October 1944 to July 1945.

==== Citation ====
SYNOPSIS: Major General Archibald V. Arnold (ASN: 0-3395), United States Army, was awarded a Bronze Oak Leaf Cluster in lieu of a Second Award of the Army Distinguished Service Medal for exceptionally meritorious and distinguished services to the Government of the United States, in a duty of great responsibility as Chief US Delegate, U.S.-U.S.S.R. Joint Commission for Korea in 1946.

=== Silver Star ===
==== Citation ====
SYNOPSIS: Major General Archibald Vincent Arnold (ASN: 0-3395), United States Army, was awarded the Silver Star for conspicuous gallantry and intrepidity in connection with military operations against the enemy during World War II.

=== Legion of Merit ===
==== Citation ====
SYNOPSIS: Major General Archibald Vincent Arnold (ASN: 0-3395), United States Army, was awarded the Legion of Merit for exceptionally meritorious conduct in the performance of outstanding services to the Government of the United States as Commanding General, 7th Infantry Division, from 1944 to 1945.

Military offices
Preceded by Charles H. Corlett	Commanding General 7th Infantry Division; 1944–1946	Succeeded by Joseph L. Ready
