= Jo So-ang =

South Korean politician (1887–1958)

Jo So-ang 조소앙 趙素昻
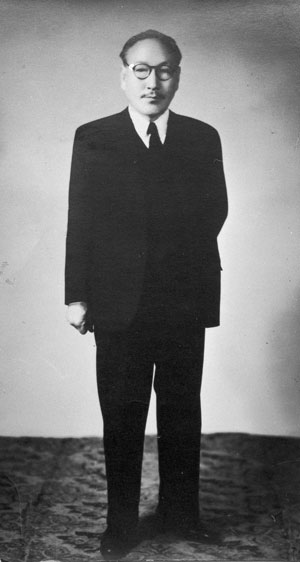
- Jo in 1936

Personal details
- Born: 30 April 1887
- Died: September 10, 1958 (aged 71)
- Party: Korea Independence Party

Jo So-ang (Korean: 조소앙; Hanja: 趙素昻; 30 April 1887 – 10 September 1958) was a Korean politician, educator, and Korean independence activist. He spent much of his career in exile in China, working in the Provisional Government of the Republic of Korea. After Korea gained its independence in 1945, he returned to Korea. He was a right-leaning politician who supported the Provisional Government over the various competing left-leaning organizations.

He participated in drawing up a draft of the proclamation of the independence of Korea in 1918 while he was studying in Japan, and after 1919, left for Shanghai to join the Provisional Government. He served various roles in the Government until 1945, including as Minister of Foreign Affairs and head of the Korean Independence Party. He also organized the society of policies on current affairs with Kim Ku and Yeo Unhyeong, contributing to establish the theories on diplomacy of the provisional government. In 1948, Jo and other politicians including Kim Ku, Kim Gyusik, and Kim Il Sung visited Pyongyang to attend a joint conference between left and right leaning politicians in an effort to keep the Korean peninsula unified.

He ran for a representative of the national assembly and was elected in 1950. In the same year when the Korean War broke out, he was abducted and taken to North Korea.

== Role in the independence movement ==
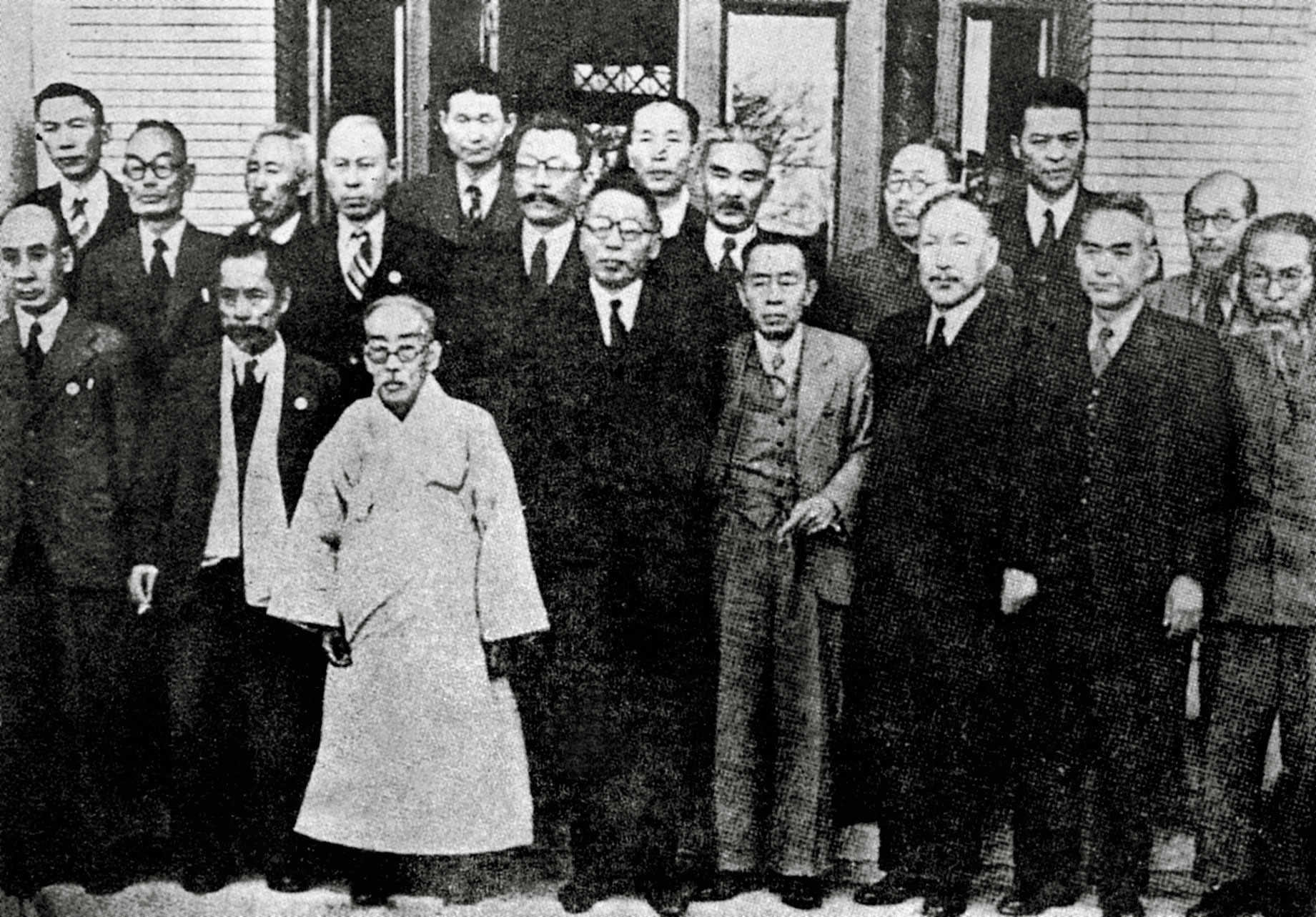
December 3, 1945. A photograph commemorating the return of the Provisional Government leaders with Jo So-ang included

=== Diplomatic activity ===
Jo So-ang served roles in the Provisional Government of the Republic of Korea. The Government was established in exile in Shanghai on April 13, 1919, following the Japanese suppression of the March First Movement. The interim government resisted Japan's colonial rule of Korea and supported the Korean independence movement. In the midst of dividing political alliances, Jo So-ang remained loyal to the Provisional Government of the Republic of Korea and was elected as their secretary and diplomatic correspondent. Making him in charge of the interim government's remittances, propaganda, and public relations work. In May 1919, Jo traveled to Europe in order to attend the International Socialist Conference to appeal international support and recognition for South Korea's independence movement. In March 1921, after attending the Communist Party Congress in Moscow, Russia, he returned to Beijing with critical views on communism. Jo would incorporate his views and experience with communism when writing his political theories and teachings.

=== Legislative activity ===
In 1930, based on his "Three Principles of the Equality" Jo So-ang wrote up a draft establishing what is renowned as a national and social democracy. He argued that in order to achieve social democracy, equality between individuals, equality between ethnicities, as well as the equality between nations must be attained. Following this principle, he suggested that to acquire equality amongst individuals it must be through immediate political equality such as free and equal elections. Next, in his theory, he advocated for the equality between ethnicities. Equality between ethnicities would be achieved through equal economic developments and equal educational opportunities. For the betterment of the nation as a whole, Jo so-ang presumed that the political system should be based on a parliamentary democracy in which the execution of the assimilation of lands, production of facilities/institutions, along with a mandated educational regime should be held at the expense of the socio-economic system. In 1941, not long after the "Three Equality Principles" was accepted by the Korean Provisional Government, the theory became known as the "Fundamental Governing of National Reconstruction". Not only did his theories guide the Korean Independence Party during the occupation, but also served as the main foundations of legislation for the country post-liberation.

=== Death ===
So-ang died in 1958 at age 71.
