= Hongik Ingan =

Educational motto of South Korea

- Hangul: 홍익인간
- Hanja: 弘益人間
- RR: Hongigingan
- MR: Hongigin'gan

Hongik Ingan (Korean: 홍익인간) is the official educational motto of South Korea. The phrase can be translated to English as "To broadly benefit the human world". Hongik Ingan was the founding principle of Gojoseon, the first Korean kingdom, and the first major idea conceptualized by its founding king, Dangun Wanggeom.

== See also ==
- Three Principles of the Equality
- Strong and Prosperous Nation
- Ilminism — "Political Hongik Ingan" based on Ilminism is synonymous with Ahn Ho-sang's concept of "Dangun nationalism" to combat communism. Ahn was educated at Friedrich-Schiller-Universität Jena in Germany. His work lasted between 1949 and 1952.
