= United States Army Military Government in Korea =

1945–1948 U.S.-occupied southern Korea

United States Army Military Government in Korea 재조선 미국 육군사령부 군정청 (Korean)
- 1945–1948
- Top: Flag of the United States; Bottom: Flag of South Korea Emblem
- Anthem: "The Star-Spangled Banner" (de jure) "Aegukga" (de facto)
- Location of the United States Army Military Government in Korea in the Korean Peninsula
- Status: Military occupational transitional government
- Capital and largest city: Seoul
- Official languages: Korean, English

Government
  - President: Harry S. Truman
- US commander-in-chief
  - 1945–1948: John R. Hodge
- Governor
  - 1945: Archibald V. Arnold (US military)
  - 1945–1947: Archer L. Lerch (US military)
  - 1947–1948: William F. Dean (US military)
  - 1948–1949: Charles G. Helmick (US military)
  - 1947–1948: Ahn Chai-hong (civil, US appointed)
- Chairman of assembly
  - 1946–1948: Kim Kyu-sik
- Historical era: Cold War
  - Surrender of Japan: 15 August 1945
  - United States troops stationed: 8 September 1945
  - Autumn Uprising: 1 October 1946
  - General election: 10 May 1948
  - Constitution: 17 July 1948
  - Republic established: 15 August 1948
- Currency: Won, "A yen" scrip, United States dollar
Preceded by
Chōsen
People's Republic of Korea
Provisional Government of the Republic of Korea
Succeeded by
First Republic of Korea
- Today part of: South Korea; North Korea

Korean name
- Hangul: 재조선 미국 육군사령부 군정청
- Hanja: 在朝鮮美國陸軍司令部軍政廳
- RR: Jaejoseon Miguk yukgun saryeongbu gunjeongcheong
- MR: Chaejosŏn Miguk yukkun saryŏngbu kunjŏngch'ŏng

The United States Army Military Government in Korea (USAMGIK) was the official ruling body of the southern half of the Korean Peninsula from 9 September 1945 to 15 August 1948.

The country during this period was plagued with political and economic chaos, which arose from a variety of causes. The after-effects of the Japanese occupation were still being felt in the occupation zone, as well as in the Soviet zone in the north. Popular discontent stemmed from the United States' military government's support of the Japanese colonial government; then once removed, keeping the former Japanese governors on as advisors; by ignoring, censoring, and forcibly disbanding the functional and popular People's Republic of Korea (PRK); and finally by supporting United Nations elections that divided the country. The U.S. administration refused to recognize the Provisional Government of the Republic of Korea, despite the South Korean government considering it their predecessor since 1987.

In addition, the U.S. military was largely unprepared for the challenge of administering the country, arriving with no knowledge of the language or political situation. Thus, many of their policies had unintended, destabilizing effects. Waves of refugees from North Korea (estimated at 400,000) and returnees from abroad caused further turmoil.

== Background ==
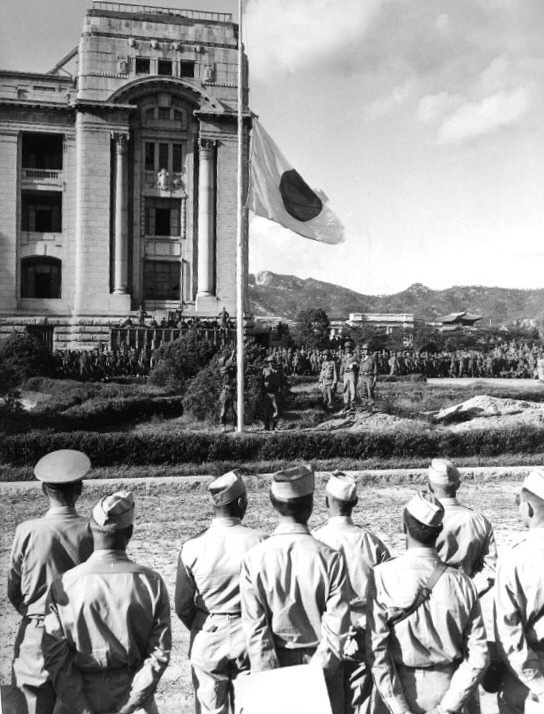
Japanese forces surrender to the U.S. Army at Seoul, Korea, on 9 September 1945

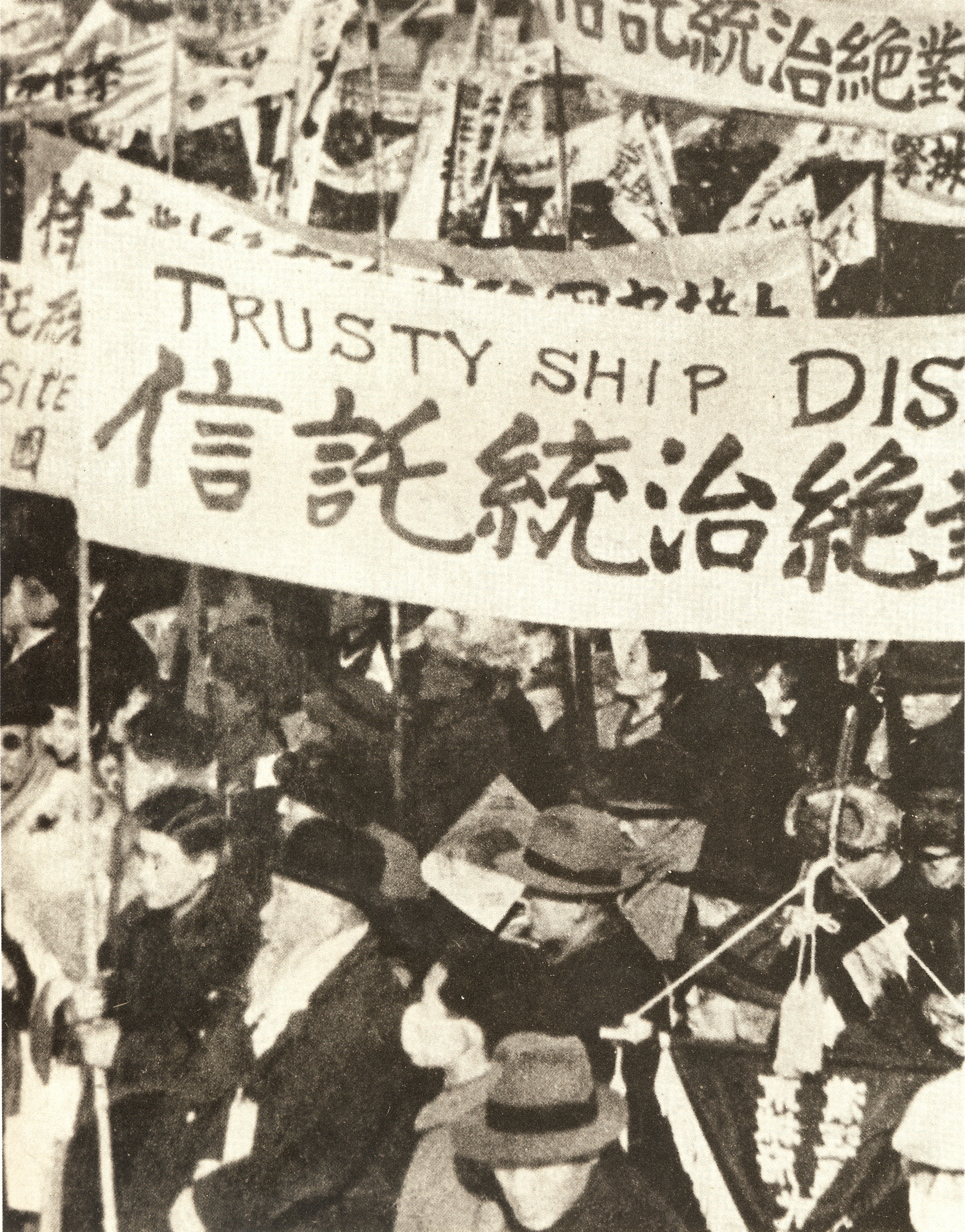
Anti-trusteeship movement protest, December 1945

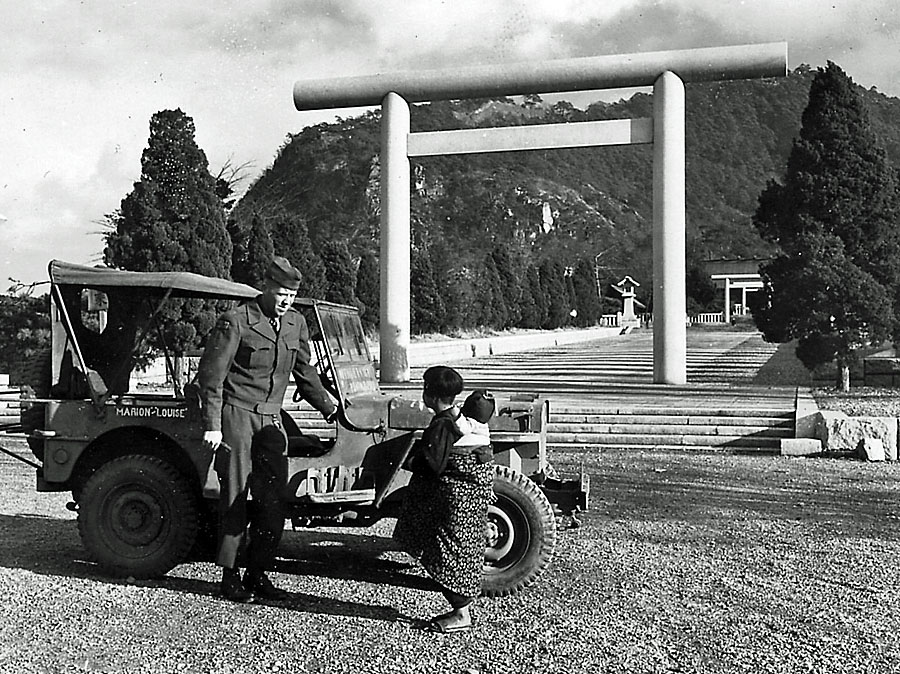
A young Korean girl carrying a baby, speaking to a U.S. soldier in front of Chōsen Shrine in Seoul (1945)

The short-lived People's Republic of Korea had been established in August, in consultation with Japanese authorities, and rapidly exerted control throughout the country. The U.S. Military Government outlawed it in the South shortly after their arrival. The leader of the People's Republic, Yeo Un-hyeong, stepped down and formed the People's Party of Korea. The U.S. administration also refused to recognize the members of the Provisional Government of the Republic of Korea, led by Kim Ku, who were obliged to enter the country as private citizens.

== History ==
=== Key events ===
From 1910 to 1945, Korea was ruled by the Empire of Japan as a colony. “On August 11, 1945, as World War II drew to a close, two U.S. Army planning officers in Washington chose an invisible line across Korea, the 38th Parallel, for dividing the former Japanese colony into Soviet and American [occupation] zones, north and south.” After the surrender of the Empire of Japan to the Allies, the division at the 38th parallel marked the beginning of American and Soviet command over what is known today as South Korea and North Korea, respectively.

From 1945 to 1948 the overall responsibility of southern Korea was given to General Douglas MacArthur as Supreme Commander for the Allied Powers due to the vague orders and lack of guidance from both the Joint Chiefs of Staff and the Department of State regarding Korea. Washington, D.C. decided to give MacArthur a free hand to deal with Korea however he wished. He ordered the XXIV Corps under Lt. General John R. Hodge to not only accept the surrender of Japanese forces but also to set up a military occupation of Korea. U.S. forces landed at Jinsen on 8 September 1945, and established a military government shortly thereafter. The forces landing at Jinsen were of the XXIV Corps of the U.S. Tenth Army. Four days before he arrived in Southern Korea, Hodge told his officers that Korea "was an enemy of the United States", as it had been a Japanese territory.

On 9 September, at a surrender ceremony, Hodge announced that the Japanese colonial government would remain intact, including its personnel and its governor-general. After a major outcry, Hodge replaced the governor-general with an American and removed all the Japanese bureau chiefs, though he, in turn, enlisted the former Japanese bureaucrats as advisors.

Faced with mounting popular discontent, in October 1945 Hodge established the Korean Advisory Council. The majority of the Council seats were given to members of the Korean Democratic Party which had been formed at the encouragement of the U.S. and was primarily made up of large landowners, wealthy businesspeople, and former officials in the colonial government. A few members of the PRK were offered to join, but they refused and instead criticized the Council appointees for their collaboration with the Japanese.

A proposal was made in 1945 for a long-term trusteeship arrangement. In December 1945, the United States and the Soviet Union agreed to administer the country under the U.S.–Soviet Joint Commission, as termed by the Moscow Conference of Foreign Ministers. It was agreed that Korea would govern independently after four years of international oversight. However, both the United States and the USSR approved Korean-led governments in their respective halves, each of which was favorable to the occupying power's political ideology. In the south the interim legislature and the interim government were headed by Kim Kyu-shik and Syngman Rhee, respectively, and the elections for which were met with a large uprising.

The USAMGIK banned strikes on 8 December and outlawed the people's committees on 12 December 1945. However, in September 1946 the Communist Party of Korea initiated a General Strike. This started among railway workers in Busan but it spread to other industries by 24 September and more than a quarter of a million workers joined in the strike. The USAMG organised military operations to oppose the strikers and also encouraged right-wing anti-communist groups. On 1 October a strike protest in Daegu was fired on by police and a worker was killed. Demonstrations in the following days developed into the 'Autumn Uprising'. The U.S. administration responded by declaring martial law, firing into crowds of demonstrators and killing a publicly unknown number of people. In November of 1946, Hodge called for an official denunciation of the Korean People's Republic which he warned meant a declaration of war on Korean Communism, leading to the arrest of leaders of people's committees who were then replaced with right-wing officials.

The Jeju uprising started during the U.S. occupation period in April 1948 when left wing radicals killed 30 South Korean police officers. This uprising happened after a South Korean communist named Pak Hon-yong (who collaborated with Kim Il-sung in Pyongyang) called on left wing and communist groups south of the 38th parallel to oppose the 1948 Korean elections by whatever means necessary, and called for a general strike to begin on 7 February. At this point, there were at least 60,000 members of the communist Workers' Party of South Korea on Jeju, and at least 80,000 active supporters. These members and supporters not only went on strike but in some cases attacked government installations and engaged with police forces in open conflict. These engagements between SKLP guerrillas against rightist groups and police continued through March 1948. Violence escalated dramatically following South Korea's independence in August 1948. President Syngman Rhee's government largely suppressed the uprising by May 1949. The conflict in Jeju saw atrocities by both sides and caused the deaths of 14,000 to 30,000 people.

== Education ==
Among the earliest edicts promulgated by USAMGIK was one reopening all schools, issued in November 1945. No immediate changes were made in the educational system, which was simply carried over from the Japanese colonial period. In this area, as in others, the military government sought to maintain the forms of the Japanese occupation system.

Although it did not implement sweeping educational reforms, the military government did lay the foundations for reforms which were implemented early in the First Republic. In 1946, a council of about 100 Korean educators was convened to map out the future path of Korean education.

== Politics ==
Although the military government was hostile to leftism from the beginning, it did initially tolerate the activities of left-wing political groups, including the Korean Communist Party. They had attempted to strike a balance between hard-left and hard-right groups, encouraging moderation. However, these overtures frequently had the adverse effect of angering powerful leaders such as Syngman Rhee.

This period of reconciliation did not last long. Within a short time, the military government actively disempowered and eventually banned popular organizations that were gaining support within the general public, including the People's Republic of Korea. The justification given by the USAMGIK was its suspicion that they were aligned with the communist bloc, despite professing a relatively moderate stance compared to the actual Korean Communist Party, which had also been banned at this time.

A good symbol of how the U.S. military occupation of southern Korea went overall was when Hodge and the USAMGIK created "the South Korean Interim Legislative Assembly in December 1946. This assembly was supposed to formulate draft laws to be used as "the basis for political, economic, and social reforms."" However, the left-wing political faction, consolidated under the South Korean Workers Party, ignored the assembly and refused to participate. The conservative faction's Korea Democratic Party, "supported by landlords and small-business owners, also opposed the assembly" because their main leaders were excluded from it by the USAMGIK. The problem was that even though many of the 45-member assembly were conservatives most of the members were nominated by the moderate Kim Kyu-sik, who was the Vice President of the Provisional Government of the Republic of Korea (this was the mostly moderate institution created in 1919 during the Japanese-occupied Korea era with the ultimate goal of delivering independence to Korea in the form of a republic) and was Hodge's choice to lead a future independent South Korea. Unfortunately, Kim was not charismatic and could not inspire either the left wing or the right wing to support him.

== Inter-Korean relations ==
At the time of division, the overwhelming majority of Korean industry was concentrated in the North, while most of the agricultural land was in the South. Power lines and shipping connections were maintained during this period, but were frequently and unpredictably cut off. The North, controlled during this period by the Soviet Union, had the ability to cut off supply of electricity or fertilizer to the south, and the U.S. State Department reported it frequently did so.

== Economy ==
The economy of South Korea did not fare well during this period, although the foundations of recovery were laid. A 1947 assessment by the State-War-Navy Coordinating Committee found that the U.S. had mismanaged the Korean economy and failed to enact needed land and labor reforms. The report concluded, "Thus far the U.S. has done little more than hold its own in South Korea. The operation to date has been improvised from day to day to prevent complete collapse, and has left almost untouched the most basic problems."

The American military government imposed a set of free market reforms in Korea by removing all controls on production, collection, prices, and distribution of rice, which resulted in a substantial increase in profiteering, hoarding, and hunger despite a 60% increase in the crop yield the year before. Rationing was subsequently introduced, and inflation became rampant with the price-wage ratio reaching 6-1 by March. For example, in this period the price of a bushel of rice rose from 9.4 Yen to 2,800 yen.

Counterfeiting was reportedly a serious problem during this period.

== Dissolution ==
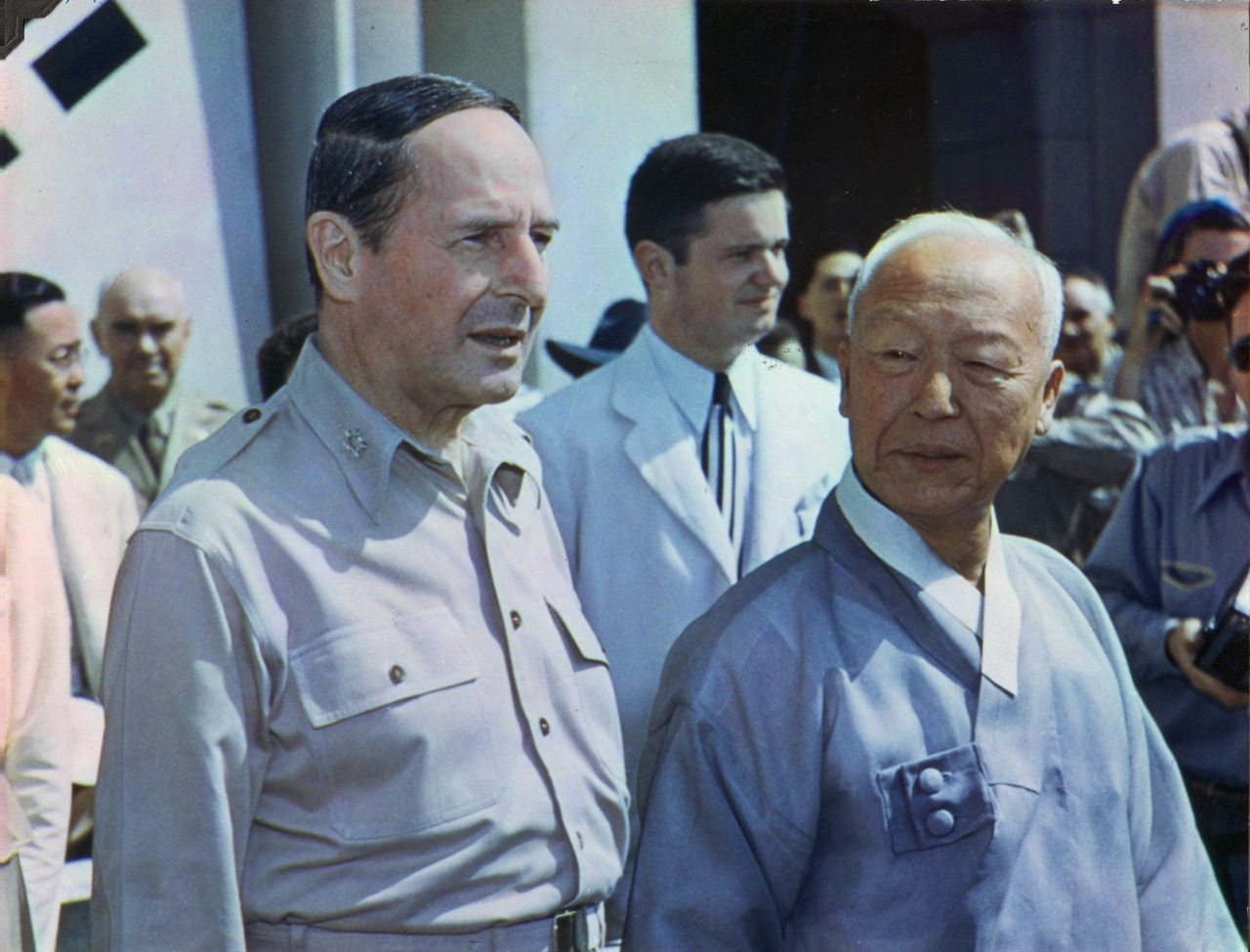
General MacArthur at the handover ceremony from Supreme Commander for the Allied Powers to President Syngman Rhee on 15 August 1948

Following the constitutional assembly and presidential elections held in May and July 1948 respectively, its first government officially proclaimed the existence of the Republic of Korea on 15 August 1948. American troops finally withdrew in 1949.

== See also ==
- Operation Blacklist Forty
- Korean general strike of September 1946
- History of South Korea
- Provisional People's Committee for North Korea
- Soviet Civil Administration – Soviet counterpart in North Korea
- Autumn Uprising of 1946
