= People's Party of Korea =

1945–1947 political party in South Korea

People's Party of Korea 조선인민당(朝鮮人民黨)
- Leader: Lyuh Woon-Hyung
- Founded: 12 November 1945
- Dissolved: 28 February 1947
- Succeeded by: Laboring People's Party
- Ideology: Social democracy Democratic socialism
- Political position: Centre-left to left-wing

The People's Party of Korea (Korean: 조선인민당; Hanja: 朝鮮人民黨) was a moderate left-wing political party created on 12 November 1945 by Lyuh Woon-Hyung. The People's Party did not claim to exclusively represent a particular class; instead, it tried to represent the entire Korean people. As the Soviet-US Committee failed in 1946, a faction within the People's Party called forty-eighters left the party and formed the Workers Party of South Korea (남조선로동당), in a coalition with Communist Party of South Korea (조선공산당) and New People's Party (신민당). The People's Party dissolved soon thereafter, and Lyuh later formed the Laboring People's Party (근로인민당).

== History ==
=== Activities ===
They propelled the "Left-Right Coalition Movement in Korean peninsula" (좌우합작운동)
