= Workers' Party of South Korea =

1946–1949 political party in South Korea

Workers' Party of South Korea 남조선로동당
- Chairman: Ho Hon
- Vice Chairman: Pak Hon-yong; Yi Ki-sok
- Founded: 23 November 1946
- Dissolved: 24 June 1949
- Merger of: Communist Party of Korea; New People's Party of Korea
- Merged into: Workers' Party of Korea
- Newspaper: Haebang Ilbo (Daily Liberation); Roryŏk Inmin (Working People)
- Membership: 360,000 (1947 estimate)
- Ideology: Communism; Marxism-Leninism
- Political position: Far-left

- Workers' Party of South Korea
- Hangul: 남조선로동당
- Hanja: 南朝鮮勞動黨
- RR: Namjoseon rodongdang
- MR: Namjosŏn rodongdang

The Workers' Party of South Korea (Korean: 남조선로동당) was a Marxist-Leninist communist party in South Korea from 1946 to 1949. It is also sometimes colloquially referred to as the "Namro Party" (남로당; 南勞黨).

== History ==
It was founded on 23 November 1946 through the merger of the Communist Party of South Korea, New People's Party of Korea and a faction of the People's Party of Korea (the so-called 'forty-eighters'). It was led by Ho Hon. The clandestine trade union movement, the All Korea Labor Union (Chŏnp'yŏng) and Korean Trade Union National Council were connected to the party.

The party was outlawed by the United States occupation authorities due to the party being an aggravating opposition to South Korea and the US, but the party organized a network of clandestine cells and was able to obtain a considerable following. It had around 360,000 party members. In 1947, the party initiated armed guerrilla struggle. As the persecution of party intensified, large sections of the party leadership moved to Pyongyang.

The party was opposed to the formation of a South Korean state. In February–March 1948, it instigated general strikes in opposition to the plans to create a separate South Korean state. On 3 April 1948, the party led an insurgency on Jeju Island, against the United Nations and South Korean government. In the suppression of the revolt, thousands of insurgents and their sympathizers were executed and massacred by the South Korean government, in an incident known as the Jeju massacre. In one of its first official acts, the South Korean National Assembly passed the National Security Act in September 1948, which among other measures, outlawed the Workers' Party of South Korea.

On 24 June 1949, the party merged with the Workers' Party of North Korea, forming the Workers' Party of Korea. Former members of the WPSK in the party became known as the domestic faction. The WPNK leader Kim Il Sung became party chairman, whereas Pak Hon-yong became deputy chairman. During the Korean War, 60,000 to 200,000 members of the party and suspected communist supporters, many of them civilians, were extrajudicially massacred by the South Korean Army in what became known as the Bodo League massacre.

Pak Hon-yong and other leaders of the WPSK in North Korea were later purged. The WPSK was the first to be sacrificed during Kim Il-sung's purge of political factions throughout the 1950s and 1960s.

== See also ==
- Pak Hon-yong
- Workers' Party of North Korea
- August faction incident
