= Korean War =

1950–1953 conflict on the Korean Peninsula

- Part of the Korean conflict and the Cold War in Asia
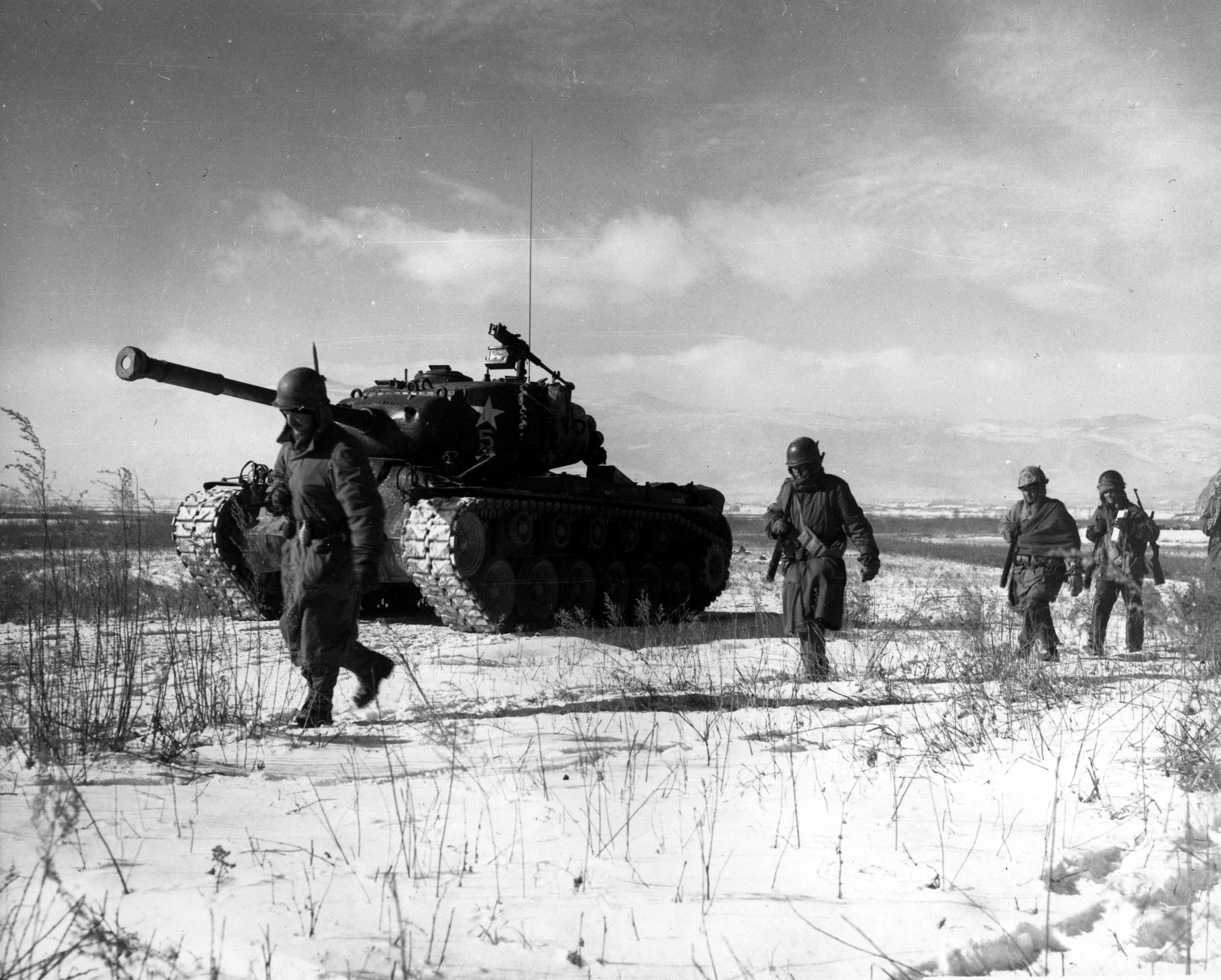
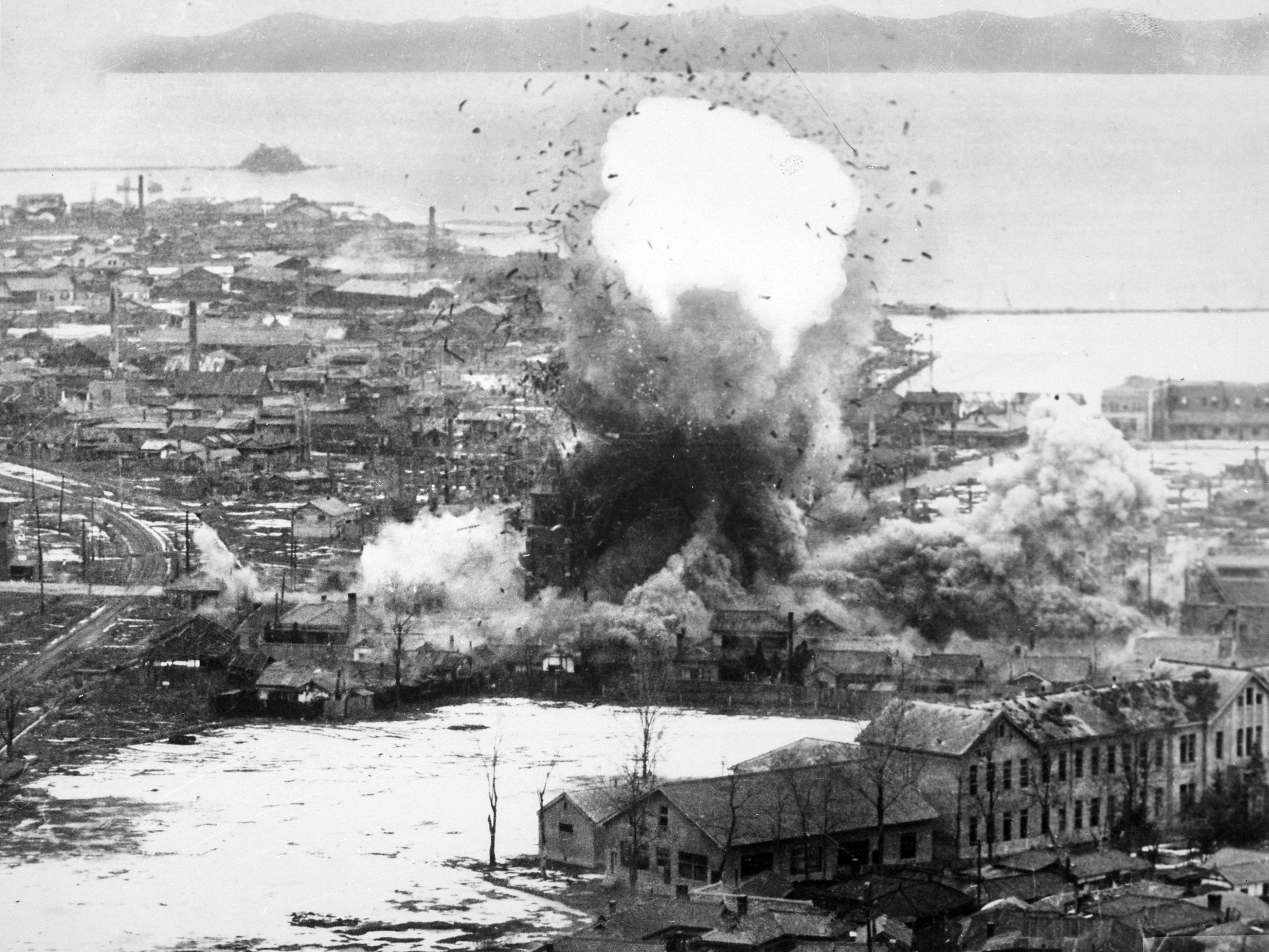
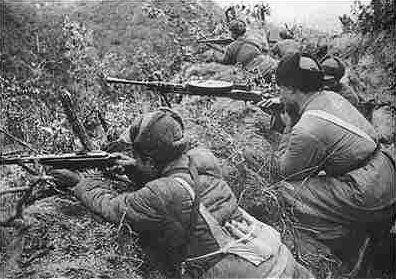
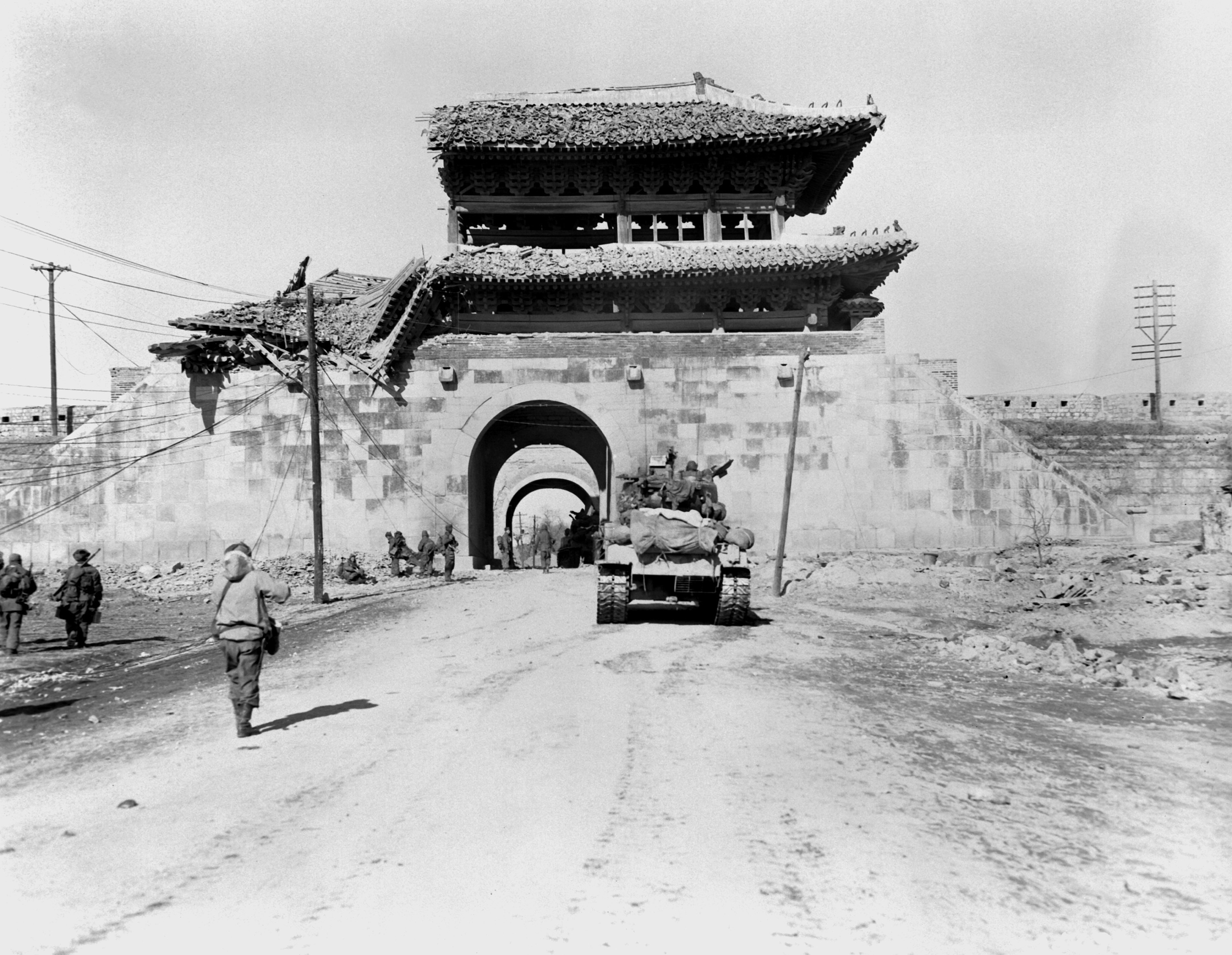
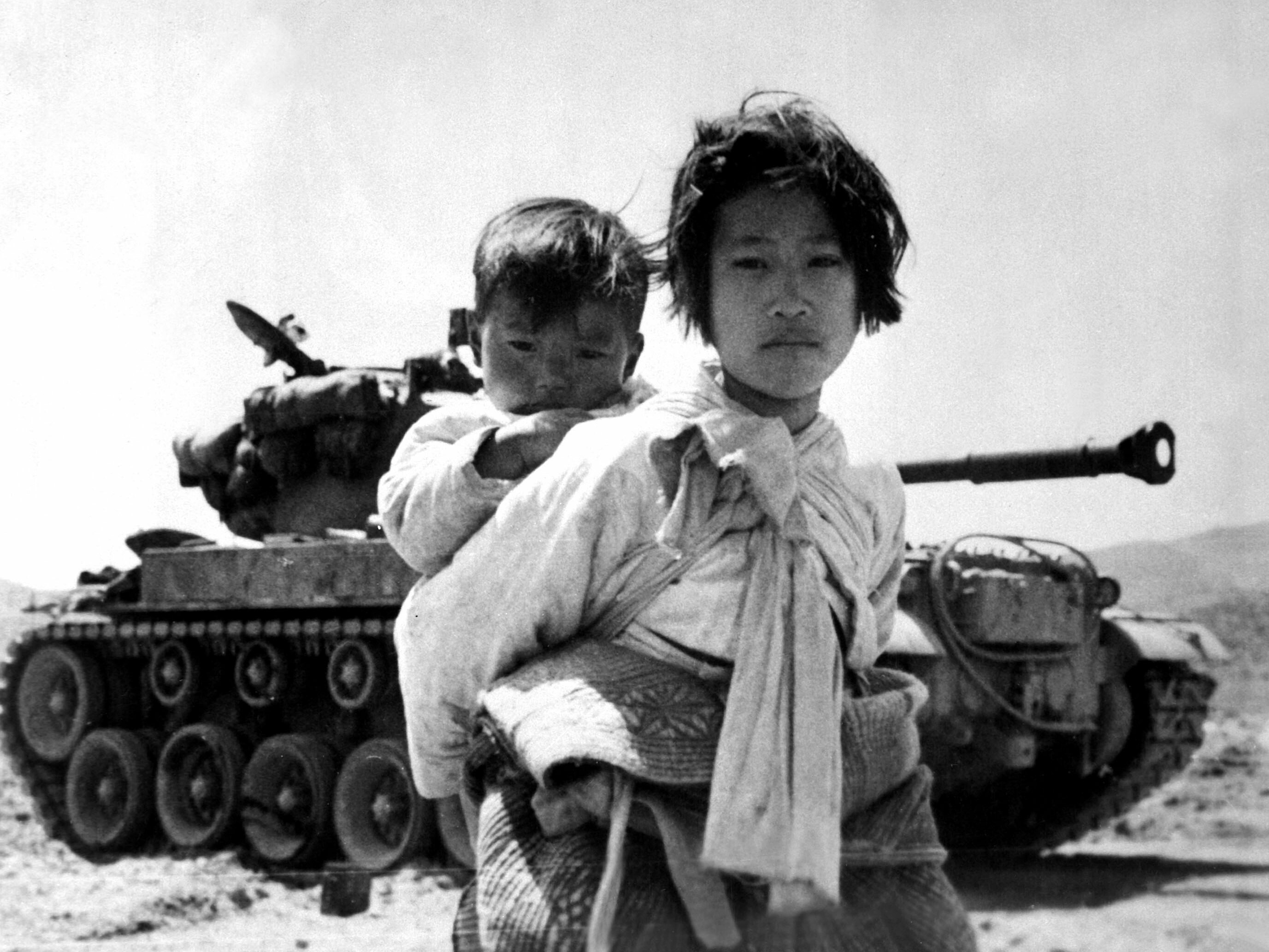
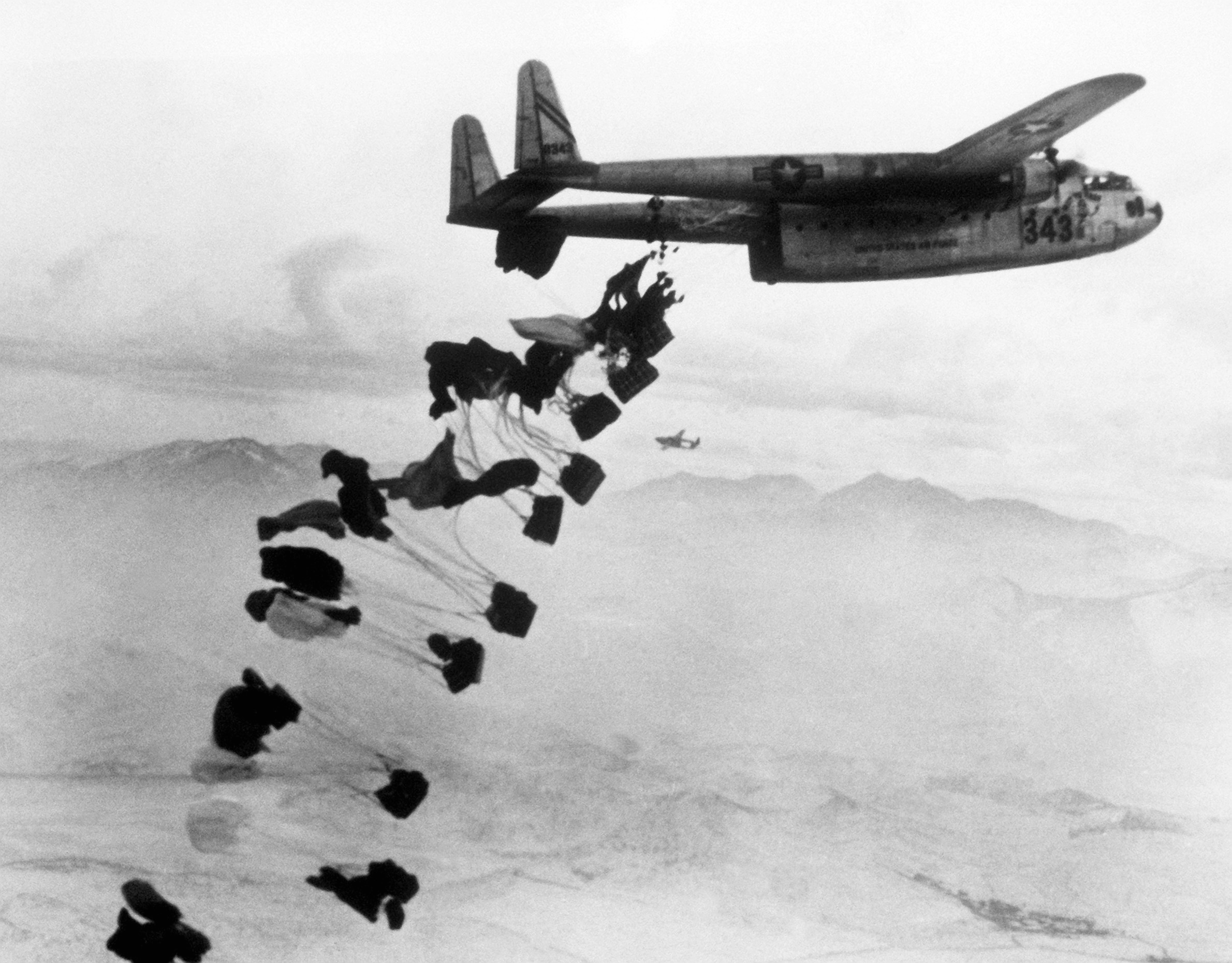
- Clockwise from top left: Infantry and armor of the US 1st Marine Division during its breakout from Chosin Reservoir, 1950; US bombing during the Blockade of Wonsan, c. 1951; Damaged gate of the Hwaseong Fortress in Suwon, c. 1951; US C-119 Flying Boxcar airdropping supplies near Chungju.; Korean refugees in front of a US M46 Patton tank, 1951; Chinese infantrymen in action at the battle of Triangle Hill, 1952
Date	25 June 1950 – 27 July 1953 (ceasefire) (3 years, 1 month and 2 days)
Location	Korean Peninsula, Yellow Sea, Sea of Japan, Korea Strait, China–North Korea border
Result	Inconclusive
Territorial changes	Korean Demilitarized Zone established; A net total of 3,900 km^{2} (1,506 sq mi) changes hands from North Korea to South Korea; North Korea gains the city of Kaesong; South Korea gains the city of Sokcho

Belligerents
South Korea; United Nations: United States; (United Kingdom) British Commonwealth	North Korea; China; Soviet Union

Commanders and leaders
Syngman Rhee; Harry S. Truman; Dwight D. Eisenhower; Douglas MacArthur; Matthew Ridgway	Kim Il Sung; Mao Zedong; Peng Dehuai; Joseph Stalin #

Strength
Peak strength 968,302 (First Republic of Korea) 602,902 (United States) 326,863 Total strength 3,089,000 (United States) 1,789,000 (First Republic of Korea) 1,300,000	Peak strength 1,742,000 (North Korea) 266,600 (China) 1,450,000 (Soviet Union) 26,000 Total strength 4,042,000 (China) 2,970,000 (Soviet Union) 72,000 (North Korea) 1,000,000+

Casualties and losses
(First Republic of Korea) South Korea: 137,899 dead 24,495 missing 8,343 captured United States: 36,515 dead or missing (Note: 7,375 remain missing or unaccounted for.); 7,245 captured (Note: 2,806 died in captivity, and 21 refused repatriation.); Other UN; 3,730 dead 379 missing Total: ~210,000 dead and missing	(North Korea) North Korea; 294,151–316,579 dead 91,206 missing (China) China; 183,108–197,653 dead 25,621 missing or captured (Soviet Union) Soviet Union; 299 dead Total: ~600,000–630,000 dead and missing
- 1.6–3 million civilians (Note: Dead or missing); 990,968 total South Korean casualties (Note: 373,599 dead, 387,744 missing, 229,625 wounded); est. 1,550,000 total North Korean casualties (Note: Includes dead, missing, and wounded)

The Korean War (25 June 1950 – 27 July 1953) was an armed conflict fought on the Korean Peninsula between North Korea (Democratic People's Republic of Korea; DPRK) and South Korea (Republic of Korea; ROK) and their allies. North Korea was supported by China and the Soviet Union, while South Korea was supported by the United Nations led by the United States under the auspices of the United Nations Command (UNC).

After the end of World War II in 1945, Korea, which had been a Japanese colony for 35 years, was divided by the Soviet Union and the United States into two occupation zones at the 38th parallel, with plans for a future independent state. The zones formed their own governments in 1948 due to political disagreements. North Korea was led by Kim Il Sung in Pyongyang, and South Korea by Syngman Rhee in Seoul; both claimed to be the sole legitimate government of all of Korea.

Both sides engaged in extensive border clashes while Rhee's government suppressed communist uprisings at Jeju and Yeosu-Suncheon. On 25 June 1950, North Korea launched an invasion of South Korea. In the absence of the Soviet Union's representative, the UN Security Council denounced the invasion, calling on member states to help repel the invasion. UN forces under the unified command comprised 21 countries, with the US providing around 90% of military personnel. On 27 June 1950, United States President Harry S. Truman ordered US air and sea forces to aid South Korea.

Seoul was captured by the KPA on 28 June, and by early August, the Republic of Korea Army (ROKA) and its allies were nearly defeated, holding onto only the Pusan Perimeter in the peninsula's southeast. On 15 September, UN forces landed at Inchon near Seoul, cutting off KPA troops and supply lines. UN forces broke out from the perimeter on 18 September, recaptured Seoul, and invaded North Korea in October, capturing Pyongyang and advancing towards the Yalu River (border with China). On 19 October, the Chinese People's Volunteer Army (PVA) crossed the Yalu and entered the war on the side of the North. UN forces retreated from North Korea in December, following the PVA's first and second offensive. Communist forces captured Seoul again in January 1951 before losing it to a UN counter-offensive two months later. After an abortive Chinese spring offensive, UN forces retook territory roughly up to the 38th parallel. Armistice negotiations began in July 1951, but dragged on as the fighting became a war of attrition and the North suffered devastating damage from UN bombing, destroying virtually all of North Korea's major cities.

Combat ended on 27 July 1953 with the signing of the Korean Armistice Agreement, which allowed the exchange of prisoners and created a 4-kilometre wide (2.5 mile) Demilitarized Zone (DMZ) along the frontline, with a Joint Security Area at Panmunjom. The industrial warfare was defined by armored offensives, with the North's initial invasion and later by UN forces, tunnel warfare by Chinese forces, and the first large jet aircraft battles. The conflict caused around one million military deaths and an estimated 1.5 million to 3 million civilian deaths. Alleged war crimes include the mass killing of alleged communists by South Korea, the Seoul National University Hospital massacre by North Korea, and the carpet bombing of North Korea by the UNC. North Korea became one of the most heavily bombed countries in history. No peace treaty has been signed; the Korean conflict remains a frozen conflict, which has occasionally flared, such as in the 1966–1969 DMZ Conflict.

== Names ==
- North Korean name
- Hangul: 조국해방전쟁; 조선전쟁
- Hanja: 祖國解放戰爭; 朝鮮戰爭
- RR: Jogukhaebang jeonjaeng; Joseon jeonjaeng
- MR: Chogukhaebang chŏnjaeng; Chosŏn chŏnjaeng

South Korean name
- Hangul: 6·25전쟁; 한국전쟁
- Hanja: 六二五戰爭; 韓國戰爭
- RR: 6·25 jeonjaeng; Hanguk jeonjaeng
- MR: 6·25 chŏnjaeng; Han'guk chŏnjaeng

In South Korea, the war is usually referred to as the "625 War" (6·25 전쟁; 六二五戰爭; Yugio jeonjaeng), the "625 Upheaval" (6·25 동란; 六二五動亂; Yugio dongnan), or simply "625", reflecting the date of its commencement on 25 June.

In North Korea, the war is officially referred to as the "Fatherland Liberation War" (조국해방전쟁; Choguk'aebangjŏnjaeng) or commonly the "Chosŏn [Korean] War" (조선전쟁; Chosŏnjŏnjaeng).

In the United States, the war was initially described by President Harry S. Truman as a "police action" as the US never formally declared war and its military actions in Korea were conducted under the auspices of the UN flag. It has sometimes been referred to in the English-speaking world as "The Forgotten War" or "The Unknown War" because of the lack of public attention it received relative to World War II and the Vietnam War.

In China, the segment of the war after the intervention of the People's Volunteer Army is commonly and officially known as the "War to Resist America and Assist Korea" (Chinese: 抗美援朝战争; pinyin: Kàngměi Yuáncháo Zhànzhēng), while the segment preceding that is officially called the "Korean Civil War" (simplified Chinese: 朝鲜内战; traditional Chinese: 朝鮮內戰; pinyin: Cháoxiǎn Nèizhàn). The term "Chosŏn War" (simplified Chinese: 朝鲜战争; traditional Chinese: 朝鮮戰爭; pinyin: Cháoxiǎn Zhànzhēng) is sometimes used unofficially. The term "Hán (Korean) War" (Chinese: 韓戰; pinyin: Hán Zhàn) is most used in Taiwan (Republic of China), Hong Kong and Macau.

== Background ==
=== Japanese colonization (1910–1945) ===
Korea was a colony ruled by the Empire of Japan from 1910 to 1945. The Empire of Japan diminished China's influence over Korea in the First Sino-Japanese War (1894–95). A decade later, after defeating Imperial Russia in the Russo-Japanese War, Japan made the Korean Empire its protectorate with the Eulsa Treaty in 1905, and then annexed it with the Japan–Korea Treaty of 1910.

Many Korean nationalists fled the country. The Provisional Government of the Republic of Korea was founded in 1919 in the Beiyang government. It failed to achieve international recognition, failed to unite the nationalist groups, and had a fractious relationship with its US-based founding president, Syngman Rhee.

The Chinese nationalist National Revolutionary Army and the communist People's Liberation Army (PLA) helped organize Korean refugees against the Japanese military, which had also occupied parts of China. The nationalist-backed Koreans, led by Yi Pom-Sok, fought in the Burma campaign (1941–1945). The communists, led by Kim Il Sung, among others, fought the Japanese in Korea and Manchuria.

At the Tehran Conference in 1943 and the Yalta Conference in February 1945, the Soviet Union promised to join the Allies in the Pacific War within three months of the victory in Europe. On 8 August 1945, the USSR declared war on Japan and invaded Manchuria. On 10 August, Soviet forces entered northern Korea and had secured most major cities in the north by 24 August, as Japanese resistance was light. Having fought Japan on Korean soil, the Soviet forces were well received by Koreans. Imperial Japanese rule of Korea officially ended when Japan surrendered to the Allies on 15 August 1945, following the atomic bombings of Hiroshima and Nagasaki.

=== Division of Korea (1945) ===
At the Cairo Conference in 1943, China, the United Kingdom, and the US decided that "in due course, Korea shall become free and independent".

On 11 August 1945, as Soviet forces invaded northern Korea, two American military officials in Washington – US Colonels Dean Rusk and Charles H. Bonesteel III – proposed to divide Korea through the 38th Parallel, with the north under Soviet control and the south under American control, in an attempt to prevent the Soviet Union from fully occupying Korea.

This was incorporated into US General Order No. 1, which responded to the Japanese surrender on 15 August. However, Joseph Stalin maintained his wartime policy of cooperation, and on 16 August, the Red Army halted at the 38th parallel for three weeks to await the arrival of US forces. In explaining the choice of the 38th parallel, Dean Rusk observed that, "Even though it was further north than could be realistically reached by US forces in the event of Soviet disagreement ... we felt it important to include the capital of Korea in the area of responsibility of American troops".

=== Joint US-Soviet occupation (1945–1948) ===
On 7 September 1945, General Douglas MacArthur issued Proclamation No. 1 to the people of Korea, announcing US military control over Korea south of the 38th parallel and establishing English as the official language during military control. On 8 September, US Lieutenant General John R. Hodge arrived in Incheon to accept the Japanese surrender south of the 38th parallel. Appointed as military governor, Hodge directly controlled South Korea as head of the US Army Military Government in Korea (USAMGIK 1945–48).

In December 1945, Korea was administered by the US–Soviet Union Joint Commission, as agreed at the Moscow Conference, to grant independence after a five-year trusteeship. Waiting five years for independence was unpopular among Koreans, and riots broke out. The Communist Party supported the trusteeship, while Kim Ku and Syngman Rhee led the anti-trusteeship movement against both the US Army Military Government in Korea and the Soviet military administration. To contain them, the USAMGIK banned strikes on 8 December and outlawed the PRK Revolutionary Government and People's Committees on 12 December. Following further civilian unrest, the USAMGIK declared martial law.

Citing the inability of the Joint Commission to make progress, the United Nations (UN) decided to hold an election under UN auspices to create an independent Korea, as stated in UN General Assembly Resolution 112. The Soviet authorities and Korean communists refused to participate in the election. The final attempt to establish a unified government was thwarted by North Korea's refusal. Due to concerns about division caused by an election without North Korea's participation, many South Korean politicians boycotted it. The 1948 South Korean general election was held in May. The resultant South Korean government promulgated a national political constitution on 17 July and elected Syngman Rhee as president on 20 July. The Republic of Korea (South Korea) was established on 15 August 1948.

In the Soviet-Korean Zone of Occupation, the Soviets agreed to the establishment of a communist government led by Kim Il Sung. The Democratic People's Republic of Korea (North Korea) was established on 10 July 1948. The 1948 North Korean parliamentary elections took place in August. The Soviet Union withdrew its forces in 1948 and the US in 1949.

=== Chinese Civil War (1945–1949) ===
With the end of the war with Japan, the Chinese Civil War resumed in earnest between the Communists and the Nationalist-led government. While the Communists were struggling for supremacy in Manchuria, they were supported by the North Korean government with matériel and manpower. According to Chinese sources, the North Koreans donated 2,000 railway cars worth of supplies while thousands of Koreans served in the Chinese PLA during the war. North Korea also provided the Chinese Communists in Manchuria with a safe refuge for non-combatants and communications with the rest of China. As a token of gratitude, between 50,000 and 70,000 Korean veterans who served in the PLA were sent back along with their weapons, and they later played a significant role in the initial invasion of South Korea. China promised to support the North Koreans in the event of a war against South Korea.

=== Communist insurgency in South Korea (1948–1950) ===
By 1948, a North Korea-backed insurgency had broken out in the southern half of the peninsula. This was exacerbated by the undeclared border war between the Koreas, which saw division-level engagements and thousands of deaths on both sides. The ROK was almost entirely trained and focused on counterinsurgency, rather than conventional warfare. They were equipped and advised by a force of a few hundred American officers, who were successful in helping the ROKA to subdue guerrillas and hold its own against North Korean military (Korean People's Army, KPA) forces along the 38th parallel. Approximately 8,000 South Korean soldiers and police officers died in the insurgent war and border clashes.

The first socialist uprising occurred without direct North Korean participation, though the guerrillas still professed support for the northern government. Beginning in April 1948 on Jeju Island, the campaign saw arrests and repression by the South Korean government in the fight against the South Korean Labor Party, resulting in 30,000 violent deaths, among them 14,373 civilians, of whom 2,000 were killed by rebels and 12,000 by ROK security forces. The Yeosu–Suncheon rebellion overlapped with it, as several thousand army defectors waving red flags massacred right-leaning families. This resulted in another brutal suppression by the government and between 2,976 and 3,392 deaths. By May 1949, both uprisings had been crushed.

Insurgency reignited in the spring of 1949 when attacks by guerrillas in the mountainous regions (buttressed by army defectors and North Korean agents) increased. Insurgent activity peaked in late 1949 as the ROKA engaged so-called People's Guerrilla Units. Organized and armed by the North Korean government, and backed by 2,400 KPA commandos who had infiltrated through the border, these guerrillas launched an offensive in September aimed at undermining the South Korean government and preparing the country for the KPA's arrival in force. This offensive failed. However, the guerrillas were now entrenched in the Taebaek-san region of the North Gyeongsang Province and the border areas of the Gangwon Province.

While the insurgency was ongoing, the ROKA and KPA engaged in battalion-sized battles along the border, starting in May 1949. Border clashes between South and North continued on 4 August 1949, when thousands of North Korean troops attacked South Korean troops occupying territory north of the 38th parallel. The 2nd and 18th ROK Infantry Regiments repulsed attacks in Kuksa-bong, and KPA troops were "completely routed". Border incidents decreased by the start of 1950.

Meanwhile, counterinsurgencies in the South Korean interior intensified; persistent operations, paired with worsening weather, denied the guerrillas sanctuary and wore away their fighting strength. North Korea responded by sending more troops to link up with insurgents and build more partisan cadres; North Korean infiltrators had reached 3,000 soldiers in 12 units by the start of 1950, but all were destroyed or scattered by the ROKA.

On 1 October 1949, the ROKA launched a three-pronged assault on the insurgents in South Cholla and Taegu. By March 1950, the ROKA claimed 5,621 guerrillas killed or captured and 1,066 small arms seized. This operation crippled the insurgency. Soon after, North Korea made final attempts to keep the uprising active, sending battalion-sized units of infiltrators under the commands of Kim Sang-ho and Kim Moo-hyon. The first battalion was reduced to a single man over the course of engagements by the ROKA 8th Division. The second was annihilated by a two-battalion hammer-and-anvil maneuver by units of the ROKA 6th Division, resulting in a toll of 584 KPA guerrillas (480 killed, 104 captured) and 69 ROKA troops killed, plus 184 wounded. By the spring of 1950, guerrilla activity had mostly subsided; the border, too, was calm.

=== Prelude to war (1950) ===
By 1949, South Korean and US military actions had reduced indigenous communist guerrillas in the South from 5,000 to 1,000. However, Kim Il Sung believed widespread uprisings had weakened the South Korean military and that a North Korean invasion would be welcomed by much of the South Korean population. Kim began seeking Stalin's support for an invasion in March 1949, traveling to Moscow to persuade him. Kim and second-in-command Pak Hon-yong tried to enlist Soviet ambassador Terentii Shtykov. Kim met with the ambassador on 12 August 1949; Shtykov said that an outright invasion was out of the question unless South Korea attacked first and that he only willing to consider a limited operation targeting the Ongjin peninsula. Mun Il visited Soviet chargé d'affaires Grigory Tunkin on 3 September 1949. Tunkin's report to the Soviet government was more neutral than previous Soviet diplomats, who were more skeptical.

Stalin initially did not think the time was right for a war in Korea. PLA forces were still embroiled in the Chinese Civil War, while US forces remained stationed in South Korea. After learning about Kim and Pak's plans, he told Tunkin to talk to Kim to produce an assessment of the South Korean and North Korean armed forces. After assessing both sides, Tunkin suggested against an invasion, to which Stalin agreed to and also banned the limited strike on the Ongjin peninsula. Kim continued his insistence on an invasion. On 17 January 1950, he told Soviet diplomats that South Korea needed to be liberated.

By 1950, Stalin was more open to suggestions and believed that the strategic situation had changed: PLA forces under Mao Zedong had secured final victory, US forces had withdrawn from Korea, and the Soviets had detonated their first nuclear bomb, breaking the US monopoly. As the US had not directly intervened to stop the communists in China, Stalin calculated they would be even less willing to fight in Korea, which had less strategic significance. The Soviets had cracked the codes used by the US to communicate with their embassy in Moscow, and reading dispatches convinced Stalin that Korea did not have the importance to the US that would warrant a nuclear confrontation.

On 30 January 1950, Stalin telegraphed Shtykov, saying that any invasion "would need extensive preparations" and that "it should be organized without taking too big a risk", effectively giving the green light for preparations. Stalin began a more aggressive strategy in Asia based on these developments, including promising economic and military aid to China through the Sino-Soviet Treaty of Friendship, Alliance and Mutual Assistance. Kim spent almost a month in the Soviet Union from 30 March to 25 April, during which invasion plans were finalized. In April 1950, Stalin permitted Kim to attack the government in the South, under the condition that Mao would agree to send reinforcements if needed. For Kim, this was the fulfillment of his goal to unite Korea. Stalin made it clear Soviet forces would not openly engage in combat, to avoid a direct war with the United States.

Kim met with Mao in May 1950 and differing historical interpretations of the meeting have been put forward. According to Barbara Barnouin and Yu Changgeng, Mao agreed to support Kim despite concerns of American intervention, as China desperately needed the economic and military aid promised by the Soviets. Kathryn Weathersby cites Soviet documents which said Kim secured Mao's support. According to Park, Mao told Kim that "if the Americans would enter the war, China will help North Korea with troops". Along with Mark O'Neill, she says this accelerated Kim's war preparations. Chen Jian argues Mao never seriously challenged Kim's plans and Kim had every reason to inform Stalin that he had obtained Mao's support. Citing more recent scholarship, Zhao Suisheng contends Mao did not approve of Kim's war proposal and requested verification from Stalin, who did so via a telegram. Mao accepted the decision made by Kim and Stalin to unify Korea but cautioned Kim over possible US intervention.

The coming Korean War was one of three wars that the Soviet and Chinese leaders had planned across East Asia in 1950. The first was a North Korean invasion of South Korea, which was to be backed by Chinese forces if necessary; they also planned a Chinese invasion of Taiwan later that year, and a Viet Minh revolution in Vietnam, which was to be backed by Chinese advisors and weaponry.

Kim told his inner circle about the preparations, including Pak Hon-yong, Aleksei Hegay, Supreme People's Assembly Presidium President Kim Tu-bong, Minister of Defense Choe Yong-gon and Minister of Justice Lee Sung-yop. Soviet generals with extensive combat experience from World War II were sent to North Korea as the Soviet Advisory Group. They completed plans for attack by May and called for a skirmish to be initiated in the Ongjin Peninsula on the west coast of Korea. Kim suggested the invasion start in late June. Soviets thought the North Koreans needed more time to prepare, but as the rain season was about to begin in July, which could make North Korean advances harder, they ultimately accepted Kim's proposal. The North Koreans would then launch an attack to capture Seoul and encircle and destroy the ROK. The final stage would involve destroying South Korean government remnants and capturing the rest of South Korea, including the ports.

On 7 June 1950, Kim called for a Korea-wide election on 5–8 August 1950 and a consultative conference in Haeju on 15–17 June. On 11 June, the North sent three diplomats to the South as a peace overture, which Rhee rejected outright. On 15 June, the invasion date was set to 25 June. On 21 June, Kim revised his war plan to involve a general attack across the 38th parallel, rather than a limited operation in Ongjin. Kim was concerned that South Korean agents had learned about the plans and that South Korean forces were strengthening their defenses. Stalin agreed to this change. On 24 June, division commanders received their invasion orders. The KPA planned defeating the South Koreans in twenty-two to twenty-seven days.

While these preparations were underway in the North, there were clashes along the 38th parallel, especially at Kaesong and Ongjin, many initiated by the South. The ROK was being trained by the US Korean Military Advisory Group (KMAG). On the eve of the war, KMAG commander General William Lynn Roberts voiced utmost confidence in the ROK and boasted that any North Korean invasion would merely provide "target practice". For his part, Syngman Rhee repeatedly expressed his desire to conquer the North, including when US diplomat John Foster Dulles visited Korea on 18 June.

Though some South Korean and US intelligence officers predicted an attack, similar predictions had been made before and nothing had happened. The Central Intelligence Agency noted the southward movement by the KPA but assessed this as a "defensive measure" and concluded an invasion was "unlikely". On 23 June, UN observers inspected the border and did not detect that war was imminent.

== Course of the war ==
Territory often changed hands early in the war, until the front stabilized. Chinese and Soviet forces North Korean forces South Korean and United Nations forces

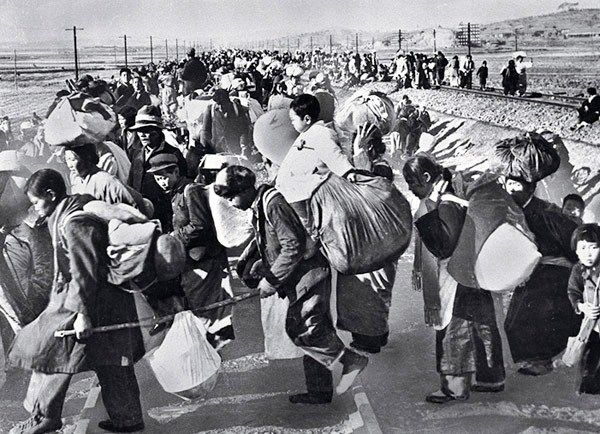
Hundreds of thousands of South Koreans fled south in mid-1950 after the North Korean army invaded.

=== North Korean invasion (June 1950) ===
At 4:40 a.m. on 25 June 1950, the KPA crossed the 38th parallel behind artillery fire. The DPRK did not declare war before the invasion (called Operation Pokpung) and rushed to encircle and eventually capture Seoul, the capital of South Korea, from the ROK within a week. KPA forces swarmed South Korea and attacked all along the 38th parallel within an hour, and individual KPA units had advanced 3 to 5 kilometers into South Korean territory within the first three hours. The KPA had a combined arms force including tanks supported by heavy artillery supplied by the Soviet Union. The ROK had no tanks, anti-tank weapons, or heavy artillery. The South Koreans committed their forces in a piecemeal fashion, and these were routed in a few days.

North Korea justified its assault with the claim ROK troops attacked first and that the KPA were aiming to arrest and execute the "bandit traitor Syngman Rhee". Fighting began on the strategic Ongjin Peninsula in the west. There were initial South Korean claims that the 17th Regiment had counterattacked at Haeju; some scholars argue the claimed counterattack was instead the instigating attack, and therefore that the South Koreans may have fired first. However, the report that contained the Haeju claim contained errors and outright falsehoods.

On 27 June, Rhee evacuated Seoul with some of the government. On 28 June, the ROK blew up the Hangang Bridge across the Han River in an attempt to stop the KPA. The bridge was detonated while 4,000 refugees were crossing it and hundreds were killed. Destroying the bridge trapped many ROK units north of the river. In spite of such desperate measures, Seoul fell that same day. Some South Korean National Assemblymen remained in Seoul when it fell, and 48 subsequently pledged allegiance to the North.

Within days of the invasion, masses of ROK soldiers, of dubious loyalty to the Syngman Rhee regime, were retreating southwards or defecting en masse to the northern side, the KPA. On 28 June, Rhee ordered the massacre of suspected political opponents in his own country. In five days, the ROK, which had 95,000 troops on 25 June, was down to less than 22,000 troops. In early July, when US forces arrived, what was left of the ROK was placed under US operational command of the UN Command.

=== UN Security Council resolutions ===
On 25 June 1950, the United Nations Security Council (UNSC) adopted Resolution 83 finding that the North Korean invasion of the Republic of Korea was a breach of the peace in violation of Chapter VII of the UN Charter. The Soviet Union, a veto-wielding power, had been boycotting the UN Security Council since January 1950 in protest of Taiwan's occupation of China's permanent seat. Thus, the Soviet Union's representative was not present at the meeting and was unable to vote against the resolution.

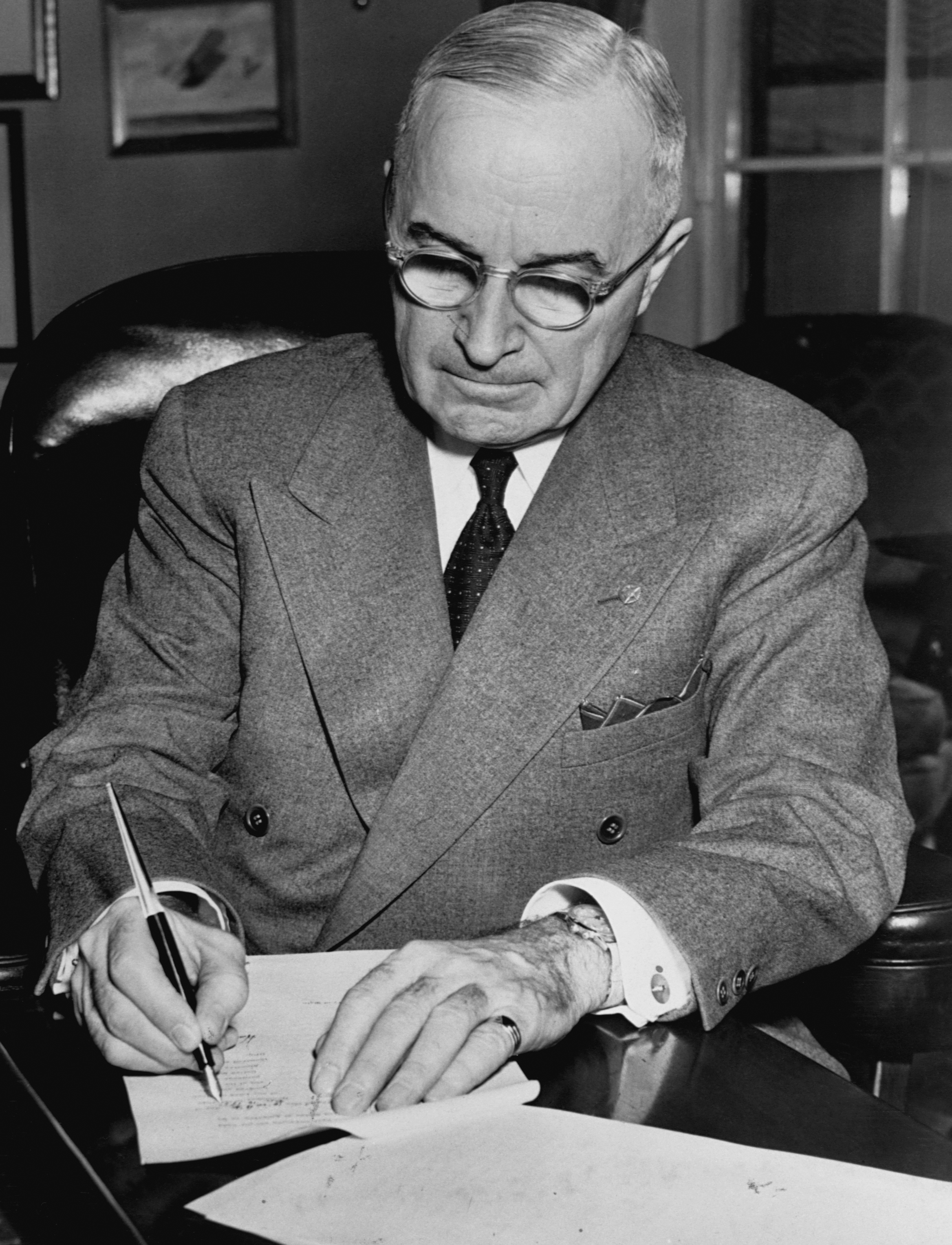
President Truman signing a proclamation declaring a national emergency and authorizing US entry into the Korean War

On 27 June, the Security Council adopted Resolution 83 recommending its member states provide military assistance to South Korea to restore international peace, resulting in a coalition led by the United States.

On 4 July, the Soviet Union's deputy foreign minister accused the US of starting an armed intervention on behalf of South Korea. The Soviet Union challenged the legitimacy of the war for several reasons. The ROK intelligence upon which UN Security Council Resolution 83 was based on came from US Intelligence; North Korea was not invited as a sitting temporary member of the UN, which violated Article 32 of the UN Charter; and the fighting was beyond the UN Charter's scope, because the initial North–South border fighting was classed as a civil war. Because the Soviet Union was boycotting the UN Security Council, some legal scholars posited that deciding upon this type of action required the unanimous vote of all five permanent members.

On 7 July, the Security Council adopted Resolution 84, which set up under the sponsorship of the British and French sides a Unified Command structure which was authorized to fly the blue flag of the UN but was not subject in any way to UN orders.

=== United States' response (July–August 1950) ===
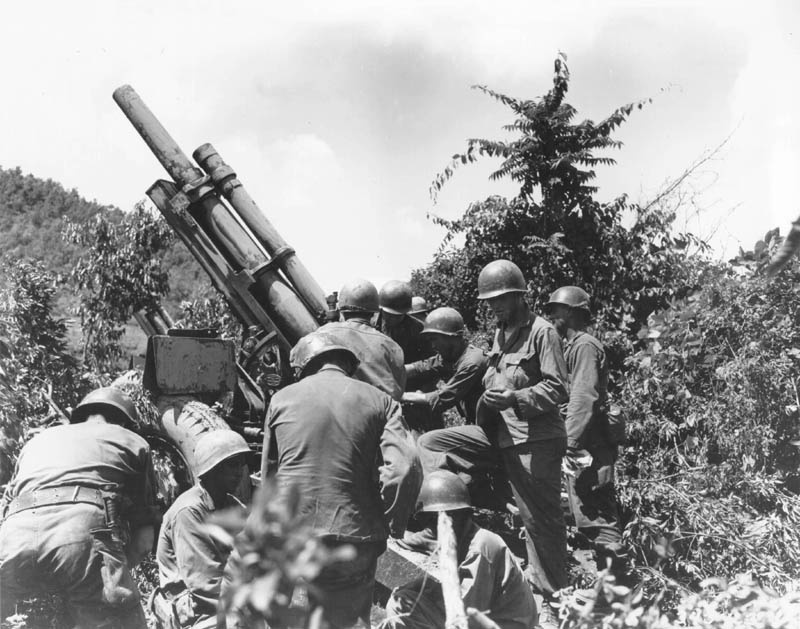
A US howitzer position near the Kum River, 15 July 1950

As soon as word of the attack was received, Acheson informed Truman that the North Koreans had invaded the Republic of Korea. Truman and Acheson discussed a US response to the invasion and agreed the US was obligated to act, comparing the North Korean invasion with Adolf Hitler's aggressions in the 1930s, and the mistake of appeasement must not be repeated. The loose notion of a "police action" was used by President Harry S. Truman as a legal pretext for ordering US troops to Korea in June 1950 without first requesting congressional authority. US industries were mobilized to supply materials, labor, capital, production facilities, and other services necessary to support the military objectives of the Korean War. Truman later explained he believed fighting the invasion was essential to the containment of communism as outlined in the National Security Council Report 68 (NSC 68):

Communism was acting in Korea, just as Hitler, Mussolini and the Japanese had ten, fifteen, and twenty years earlier. I felt certain that if South Korea was allowed to fall, Communist leaders would be emboldened to override nations closer to our own shores. If the Communists were permitted to force their way into the Republic of Korea without opposition from the free world, no small nation would have the courage to resist threats and aggression by stronger Communist neighbors.

In August 1950, Truman and Acheson obtained the consent of Congress to appropriate $12 billion for military action, equivalent to $161 billion in 2025. Because of the extensive defense cuts and emphasis on building a nuclear bomber force, none of the services were able to make a robust response with conventional military strength. General Omar Bradley, Chairman of the Joint Chiefs of Staff, was faced with deploying a force that was a shadow of its World War II counterpart.

Acting on Acheson's recommendation, Truman ordered MacArthur, the Supreme Commander for the Allied Powers in Japan, to transfer matériel to the South Korean military, while giving air cover to evacuation of US nationals. Truman disagreed with advisers who recommended unilateral bombing of the North Korean forces and ordered the US Seventh Fleet to protect Taiwan, whose government asked to fight in Korea. The US denied Taiwan's request for combat, lest it provoke retaliation from the PRC. Because the US had sent the Seventh Fleet to "neutralize" the Taiwan Strait, Chinese Premier Zhou Enlai criticized the UN and US initiatives as "armed aggression on Chinese territory". The US supported the Kuomintang in Burma in the hope these KMT forces would harass China from the southwest, thereby diverting Chinese resources from Korea.

==== Factors in US intervention ====
"Korea was a critical presence in American policy at the dawn of the Cold War. The Truman administration identified its stake in Korea in the same 'fifteen weeks' in which the containment doctrine and the Marshall Plan were hammered out."

The Truman administration was worried a war in Korea could quickly escalate without American intervention. Diplomat John Foster Dulles stated: "To sit by while Korea is overrun by unprovoked armed attack would start a disastrous chain of events leading most probably to world war." While there was hesitance by some in the US government to get involved, considerations about Japan fed into the decision to engage on behalf of South Korea. After the fall of China to the communists, US experts saw Japan as the region's counterweight to the Soviet Union and China. While there was no US policy dealing with South Korea directly as a national interest, its proximity to Japan increased its importance. Said Kim: "The recognition that the security of Japan required a non-hostile Korea led directly to President Truman's decision to intervene ... The essential point ... is that the American response to the North Korean attack stemmed from considerations of US policy toward Japan."

Another consideration was the Soviet reaction if the US intervened. The Truman administration was fearful the Korean War was a diversionary assault that would escalate to a general war in Europe once the US committed in Korea. At the same time, "[t]here was no suggestion from anyone that the United Nations or the United States could back away from [the conflict]". Yugoslavia, a possible Soviet target because of the Tito–Stalin split, was vital to the defense of Italy and Greece, and the country was first on the list of the National Security Council's post-North Korea invasion list of "chief danger spots". Truman believed if aggression went unchecked, a chain reaction would start that would marginalize the UN and encourage communist aggression elsewhere. The UN Security Council approved the use of force to help the South Koreans. The Truman administration was uncertain whether the attack was a ploy by the Soviet Union, or just a test of US resolve. The decision to commit ground troops became viable when a communiqué was received on 27 June indicating the Soviet Union would not move against US forces in Korea. The Truman administration believed it could intervene in Korea without undermining its commitments elsewhere.

==== US unpreparedness ====
The Truman administration was unprepared for the invasion. Korea was not included in the strategic Asian Defense Perimeter outlined by US Secretary of State Dean Acheson. Military strategists were more concerned with the security of Europe against the Soviet Union than that of East Asia.

In postwar analysis of the unpreparedness of US forces deployed during the summer and fall of 1950, Army Major General Floyd L. Parks stated that, "Many who never lived to tell the tale had to fight the full range of ground warfare from offensive to delaying action, unit by unit, man by man ... [T]hat we were able to snatch victory from the jaws of defeat ... does not relieve us from the blame of having placed our own flesh and blood in such a predicament."

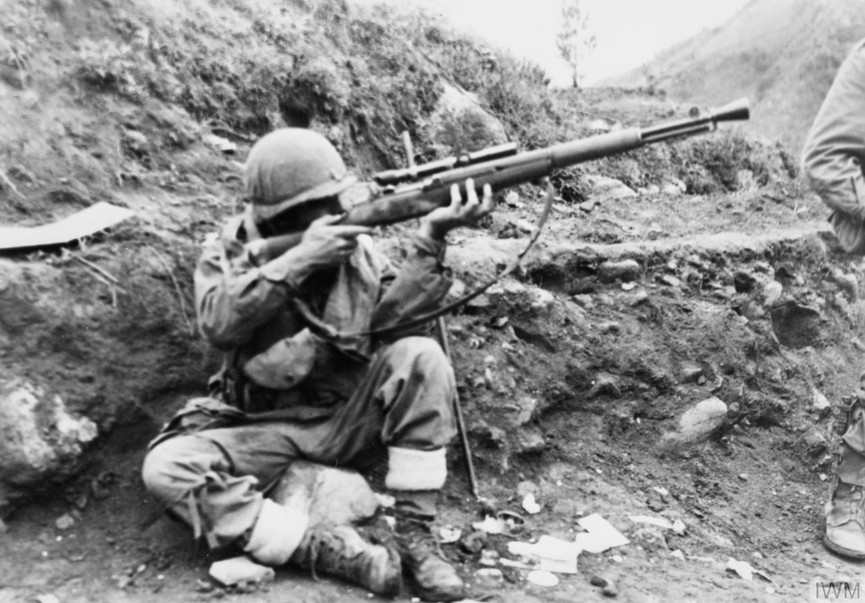
A soldier of the Dutch detachment of the UN forces in North Korea prepares to return sniper fire, 1952

By 1950, US Secretary of Defense Louis A. Johnson had established a policy of faithfully following Truman's defense economization plans and aggressively attempted to implement it, even in the face of steadily increasing external threats. He consequently received much of the blame for the initial setbacks and widespread reports of ill-equipped and inadequately trained military forces in the war's early stages.

As an initial response to the invasion, Truman called for a naval blockade of North Korea and was shocked to learn that such a blockade could be imposed only "on paper" since the US Navy no longer had the warships with which to carry out his request. Army officials, desperate for weaponry, recovered Sherman tanks and other equipment from Pacific War battlefields and reconditioned them for shipment to Korea. Army ordnance officials at Fort Knox pulled down M26 Pershing tanks from display pedestals around Fort Knox in order to equip the third company of the Army's hastily formed 70th Tank Battalion. Without adequate numbers of tactical fighter-bomber aircraft, the US Air Force took F-51 (P-51) propeller-driven aircraft out of storage or from existing Air National Guard squadrons and rushed them into front-line service. A shortage of spare parts and qualified maintenance personnel resulted in improvised repairs and overhauls. A Navy helicopter pilot aboard an active duty warship recalled fixing damaged rotor blades with masking tape in the absence of spares.

US Army Reserve and Army National Guard infantry soldiers and new inductees (called to duty to fill out understrength infantry divisions) found themselves short of nearly everything needed to repel the North Korean forces: artillery, ammunition, heavy tanks, ground-support aircraft, even effective anti-tank weapons such as the M20 3.5-inch "Super Bazooka". Some Army combat units sent to Korea were supplied with worn-out, "red-lined" M1 rifles or carbines in immediate need of ordnance depot overhaul or repair. Only the Marine Corps, whose commanders had stored and maintained their World War II surplus inventories of equipment and weapons, proved ready for deployment, though they still were woefully understrength, as well as in need of suitable landing craft to practice amphibious operations (US Secretary of Defense Louis Johnson had transferred most of the remaining craft to the Navy and reserved them for use in training Army units).

=== The drive south and Pusan (July–September 1950) ===
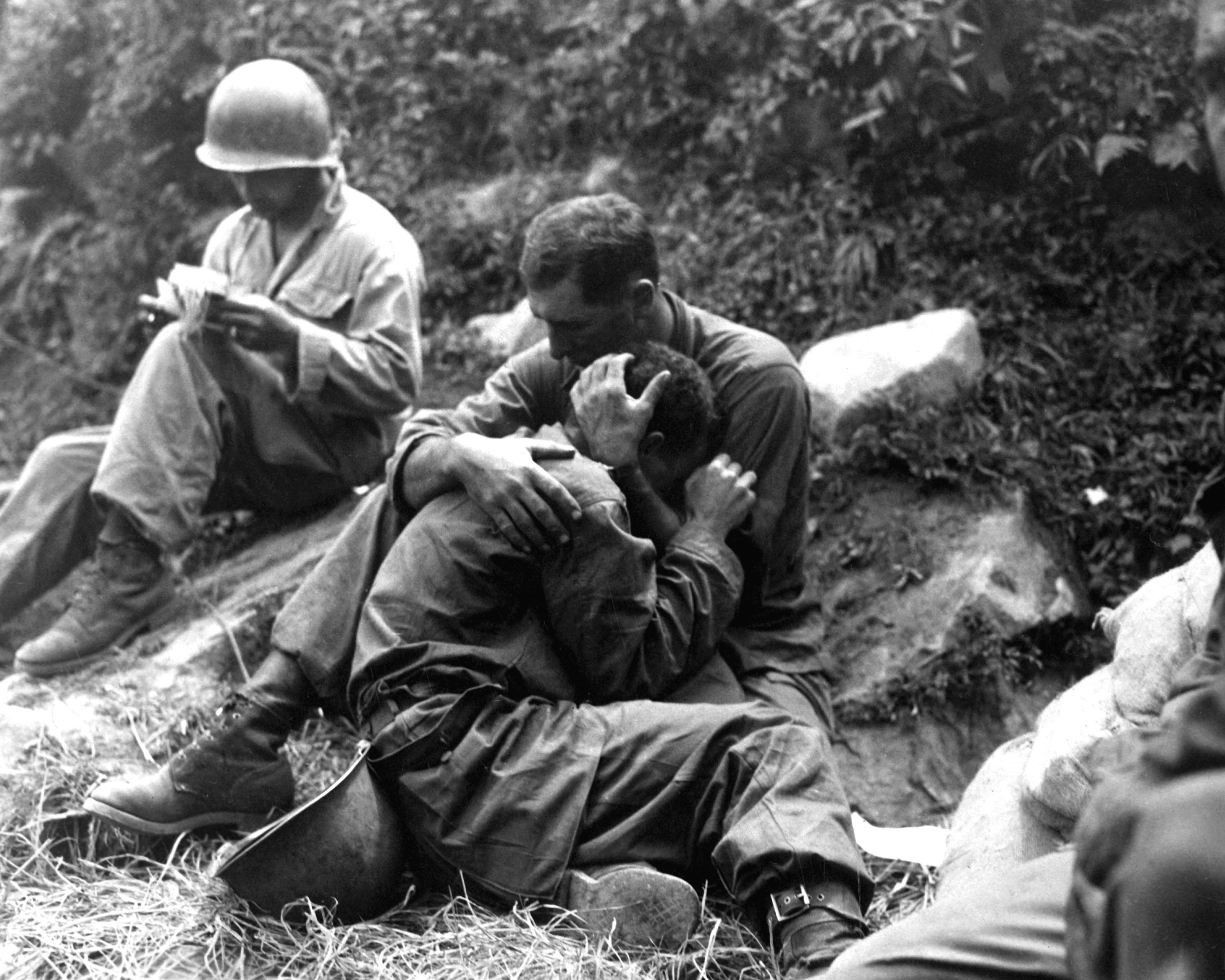
G.I. comforting a grieving infantryman

The Battle of Osan, the first significant US engagement, involved the 540-soldier Task Force Smith, a small forward element of the 24th Infantry Division flown in from Japan. On 5 July 1950, Task Force Smith attacked the KPA at Osan but without weapons capable of destroying KPA tanks. The KPA defeated the US, with 180 American casualties. The KPA progressed southwards, pushing back US forces at Pyongtaek, Chonan, and Chochiwon, forcing the 24th Division's retreat to Taejeon, which the KPA captured in the Battle of Taejon. The 24th Division suffered 3,602 dead or wounded and 2,962 captured, including its commander, Major General William F. Dean.

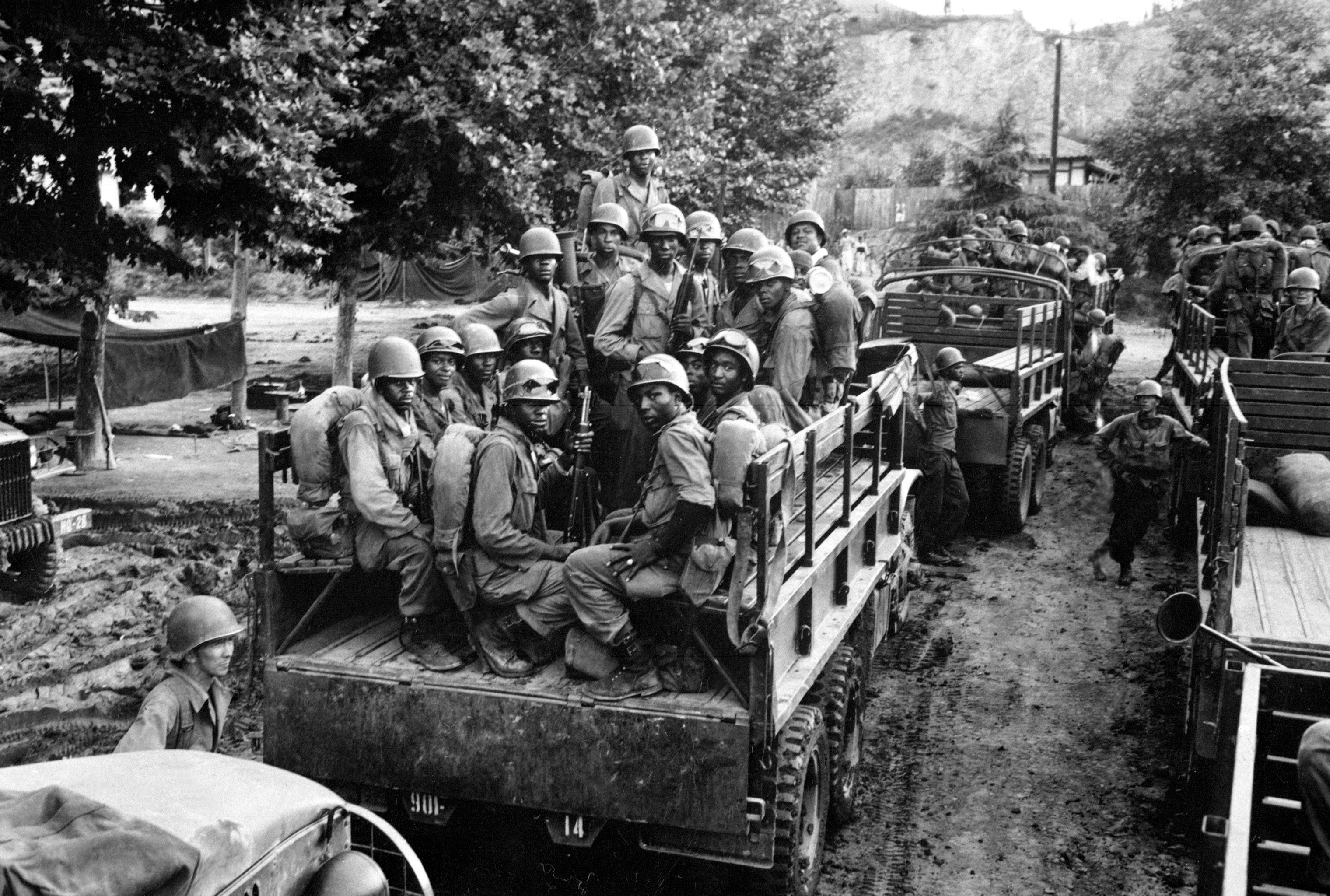
24th Infantry moves up to the firing line, 18 July 1950

On 26 July 1950, US military aircraft strafed some refugees from Joo Gok Ri and Im Gae Ri. American soldiers inspected their belonging while the tired and hungry refugees sat and ate while seated on some railway tracks. "Shortly afterward, planes appeared overhead and strafed and bombed the villagers on the tracks killing 50–150 of them. Many of the survivors scrambled for cover into twin tunnels beneath the railroad tracks. There they crouched to avoid periodic gunfire that riddled the tunnel entrances for at least a day. This small arms fire killed another 60–300 villagers." This incident is known as the No Gun Ri massacre and was unknown to the American public until Associated Press journalists revealed what had occurred seventy years after the event, winning a Pulitzer Prize for their work.

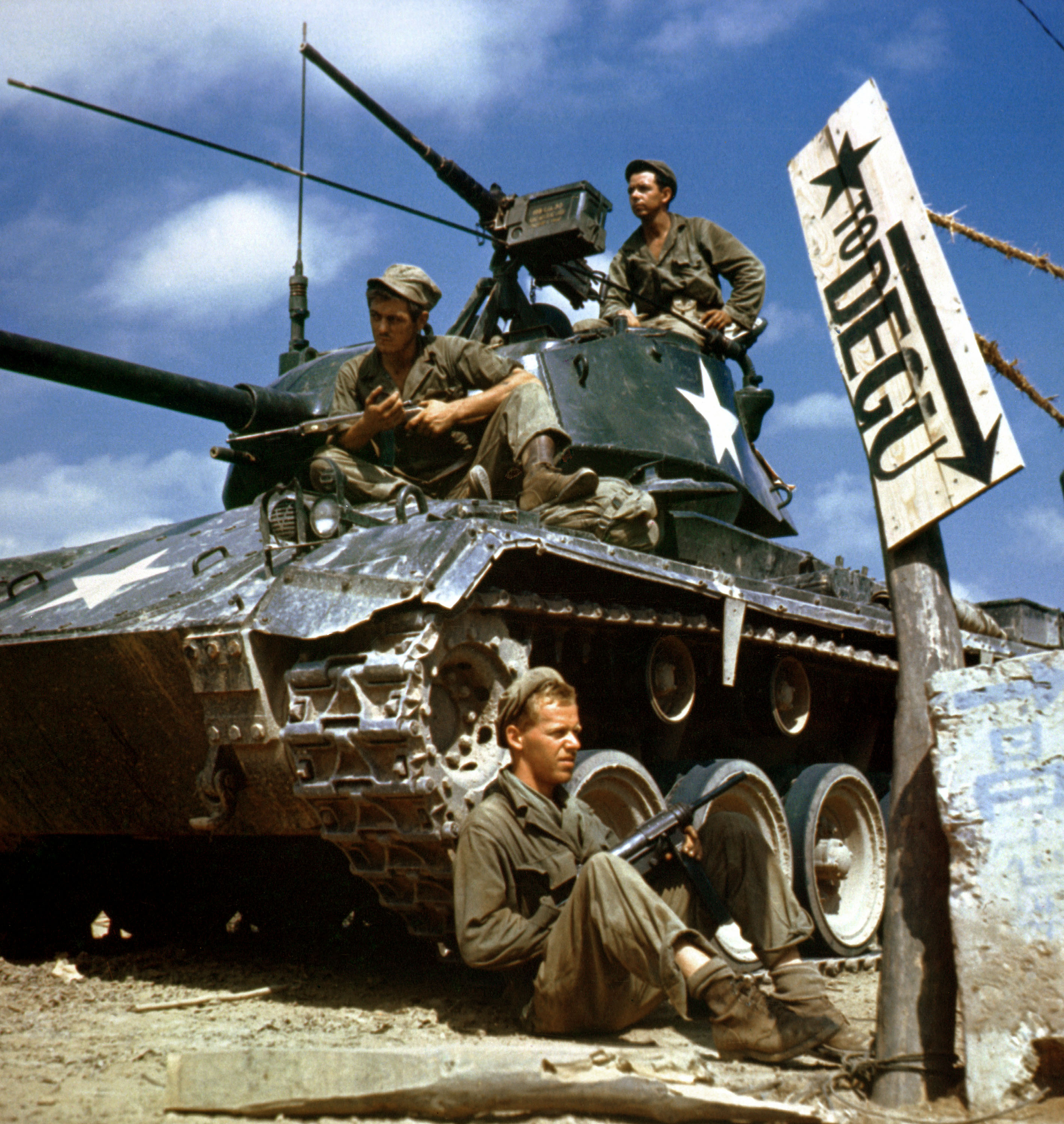
Crew of an US M24 Chaffee tank along the Nakdong River front, August 1950

By August, the KPA steadily pushed back the ROK and the Eighth United States Army southwards. The impact of the Truman administration's defense budget cutbacks was keenly felt, as US troops fought costly rearguard actions. Facing a veteran and well-led KPA force, and lacking sufficient anti-tank weapons, artillery or armor, the Americans retreated and the KPA advanced down the Peninsula. By September, UN forces were hemmed into a corner of southeast Korea, near Pusan. This 230 kilometre (140 mile) perimeter enclosed about 10% of Korea, in a line defined by the Nakdong River.

The KPA purged South Korea's intelligentsia by killing civil servants and intellectuals. On 20 August, MacArthur warned Kim Il-sung he would be held responsible for KPA atrocities.

Kim's early successes led him to predict the war would finish by the end of August. Chinese leaders were more pessimistic. To counter a possible US deployment, Zhou secured a Soviet commitment to have the Soviet Union support Chinese forces with air cover, and he deployed 260,000 soldiers along the Korean border, under the command of Gao Gang. Zhou authorized a topographical survey of Korea and directed Lei Yingfu, Zhou's military adviser in Korea, to analyze the military situation. Lei concluded MacArthur would likely attempt a landing at Incheon. After conferring with Mao that this would be MacArthur's most likely strategy, Zhou briefed Soviet and North Korean advisers of Lei's findings, and issued orders to PLA commanders to prepare for US naval activity in the Korea Strait.

In the resulting Battle of Pusan Perimeter, UN forces withstood KPA attacks meant to capture the city at the Naktong Bulge, P'ohang-dong, and Taegu. The US Air Force interrupted KPA logistics with 40 daily ground support sorties, which destroyed 32 bridges, halting daytime road and rail traffic. KPA forces were forced to hide in tunnels by day and move only at night. To deny military equipment and supplies to the KPA, the USAF destroyed logistics depots, refineries, and harbors, while US Navy aircraft attacked transport hubs. Consequently, the overextended KPA could not be supplied throughout the south. On 27 August, aircraft from the 67th Fighter Squadron mistakenly attacked facilities in Chinese territory, and the Soviet Union called the UN Security Council's attention to China's complaint about the incident. The US proposed that a commission composed of India and Sweden determine what the US should pay in compensation, but this was vetoed by the Soviet Union.

Meanwhile, US garrisons in Japan continually dispatched soldiers and military supplies to reinforce defenders in the Pusan Perimeter. MacArthur went so far as to call for Japan's rearmament. Tank battalions deployed to Korea, from the port of San Francisco to the port of Pusan, the largest Korean port. By late August, the Pusan Perimeter had 500 medium tanks battle-ready. In early September 1950, UN forces outnumbered the KPA 180,000 to 100,000 soldiers.

=== Battle of Incheon (September 1950) ===
Against the rested and rearmed Pusan Perimeter defenders and their reinforcements, the KPA were undermanned and poorly supplied; unlike the UN, they lacked naval and air support. To relieve the Pusan Perimeter, MacArthur recommended an amphibious landing at Incheon, near Seoul, well over 160 kilometres (100 miles) behind the KPA lines. On 6 July, he ordered Major General Hobart R. Gay, commander of the US 1st Cavalry Division, to plan an amphibious landing at Incheon; on 12–14 July, the 1st Cavalry Division embarked from Yokohama, Japan, to reinforce the 24th Infantry Division inside the Pusan Perimeter.

Soon after the war began, MacArthur began planning an Incheon landing, but the Pentagon opposed him. When authorized, he activated a combined US Army and Marine Corps, and ROK force. The X Corps, consisted of 40,000 troops of the 1st Marine Division, the 7th Infantry Division, and around 8,600 ROK soldiers. By 15 September, the amphibious force faced few KPA defenders at Incheon: military intelligence, psychological warfare, guerrilla reconnaissance, and protracted bombardment facilitated a light battle. However, the bombardment destroyed most of Incheon.

=== Breakout from the Pusan Perimeter ===
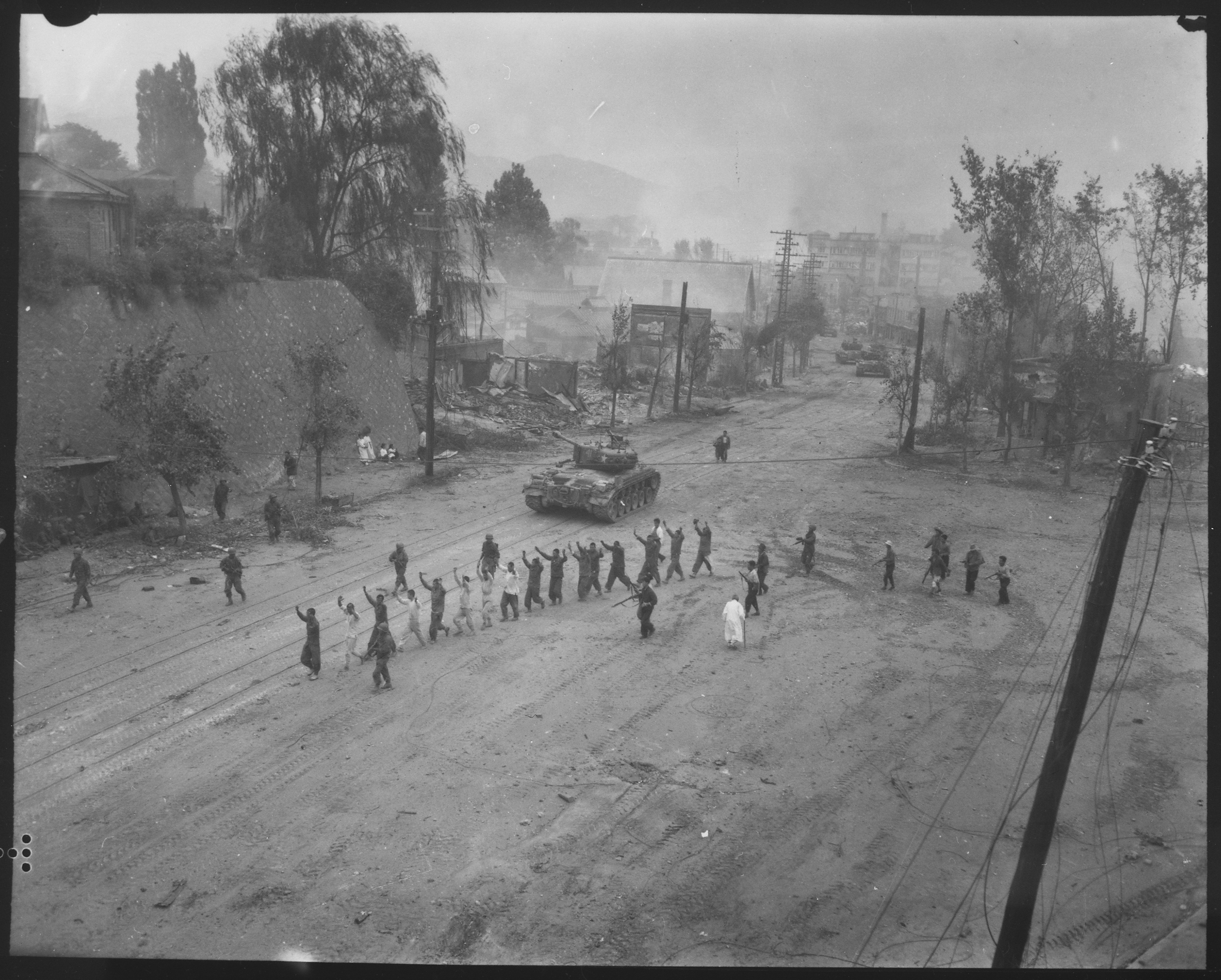
M26 Pershing tanks during the Second Battle of Seoul in September 1950. In the foreground, UN troops round up North Korean prisoners of war.

On 16 September, the Eighth Army began its breakout from the Pusan Perimeter. Task Force Lynch, 3rd Battalion, 7th Cavalry Regiment, and 70th Tank Battalion units advanced through 171 kilometres (106 miles) of KPA territory to join the 7th Infantry Division at Osan on 27 September. X Corps rapidly defeated the KPA defenders around Seoul, thus threatening to trap the main KPA force.

On 18 September, Stalin dispatched General H. M. Zakharov to advise Kim to halt his offensive around the Pusan Perimeter, and redeploy his forces to defend Seoul. Chinese commanders were not briefed on North Korean troop numbers or operational plans. Zhou suggested the North Koreans should attempt to eliminate the UN forces at Incheon only if they had reserves of at least 100,000 men; otherwise, he advised the North Koreans to withdraw their forces north.

On 25 September, Seoul was recaptured by UN forces. US air raids caused heavy damage to the KPA, destroying most of its tanks and artillery. KPA troops in the south, instead of effectively withdrawing north, rapidly disintegrated, leaving Pyongyang vulnerable. During the retreat, only 25,000 to 30,000 KPA soldiers managed to reach the KPA lines. On 27 September, Stalin convened an emergency session of the Politburo, where he condemned the incompetence of the KPA command and held Soviet military advisers responsible for the defeat.

=== UN forces invade North Korea (September–October 1950) ===
On 27 September, MacArthur received secret National Security Council Memorandum 81/1 from Truman reminding him operations north of the 38th parallel was authorized only if "at the time of such operation there was no entry into North Korea by major Soviet or Chinese Communist forces, no announcements of intended entry, nor a threat to counter our operations militarily". On 29 September, MacArthur restored the government of the Republic of Korea under Syngman Rhee. The Joint Chiefs of Staff on 27 September sent MacArthur a comprehensive directive: it stated the primary goal was the destruction of the KPA, with the unification of the Peninsula under Rhee as a secondary objective "if possible"; the Joint Chiefs added this objective was dependent on whether the Chinese and Soviets would intervene, and was subject to changing conditions.

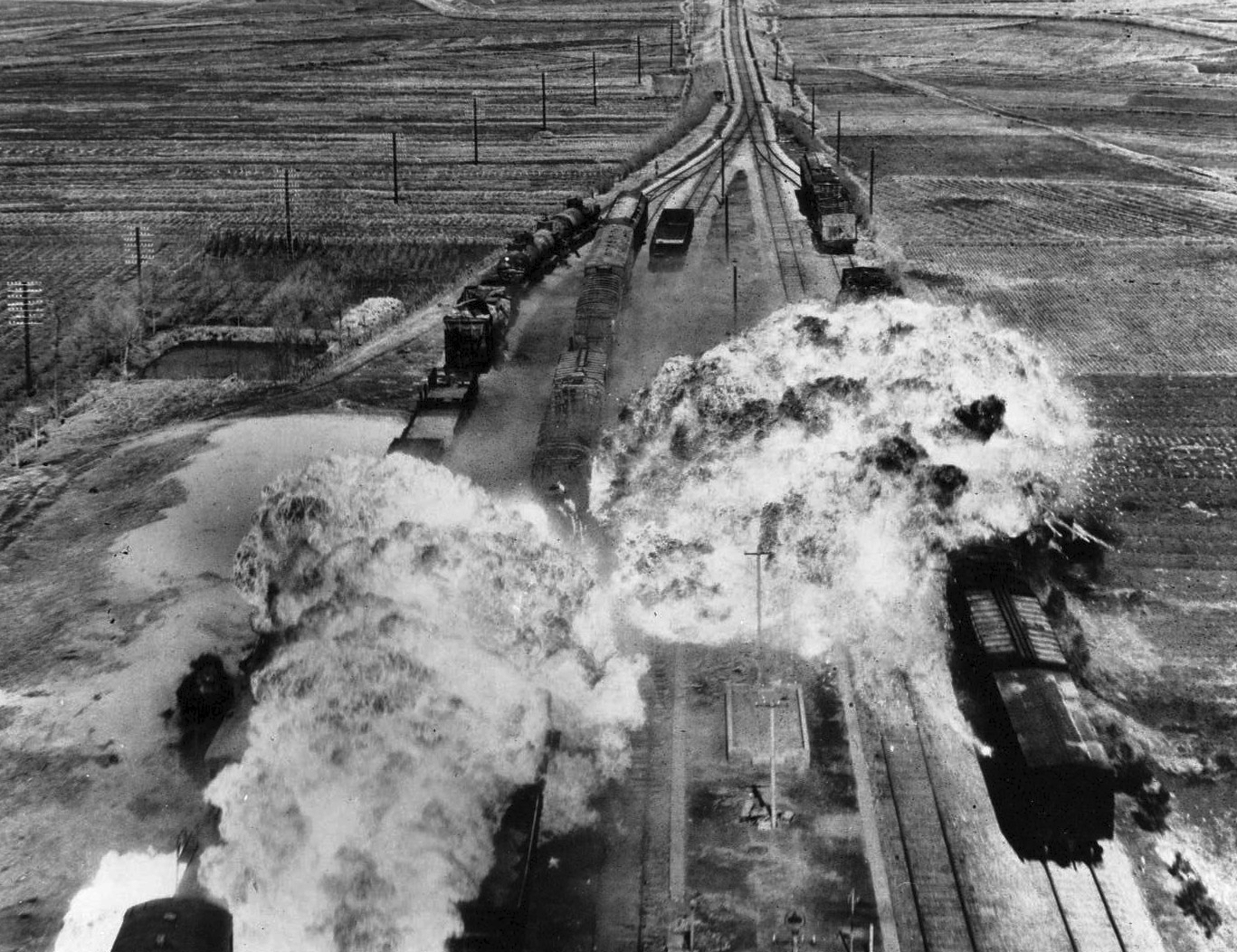
US Air Force attacking railroads south of Wonsan on the eastern coast of North Korea

On 30 September, Zhou warned the US that China was prepared to intervene if the US crossed the 38th parallel. Zhou attempted to advise KPA commanders on how to conduct a general withdrawal by using the same tactics that allowed Chinese Communist forces to escape Nationalist encirclement campaigns in the 1930s, but KPA commanders did not use these tactics effectively. Bruce Cumings argues, however, that the KPA's rapid withdrawal was strategic, with troops melting into the mountains from where they could launch guerrilla raids on the UN forces spread out on the coasts.

By 1 October, the UNC had driven the KPA past the 38th parallel, and ROK forces pursued the KPA northwards. MacArthur demanded the KPA's unconditional surrender. On 7 October, with UN authorization, the UN Command forces followed the ROK forces northwards. The US Eighth Army drove up western Korea and captured Pyongyang on 19 October. On 20 October, the US 187th Airborne Regiment made their first of their two combat jumps during the war at Sunchon and Sukchon. The mission was to cut the road north to China, prevent North Korean leaders from escaping Pyongyang, and rescue US prisoners of war.

At month's end, UN forces held 135,000 KPA prisoners of war. As they neared the Sino-Korean border, the UN forces in the west were divided from those in the east by 80–161 kilometres (50–100 miles) of mountainous terrain. In addition to the 135,000 captured, the KPA had suffered some 200,000 soldiers killed or wounded, for a total of 335,000 casualties since the end of June 1950, and lost 313 tanks. A mere 25,000 KPA regulars retreated across the 38th parallel, as their military had collapsed. The UN forces on the peninsula numbered 229,722 combat troops (including 125,126 Americans and 82,786 South Koreans), 119,559 rear area troops, and 36,667 US Air Force personnel. MacArthur believed it necessary to extend the war into China to destroy depots supplying the North Korean effort. Truman disagreed and ordered caution at the Sino-Korean border.

=== China intervenes (October–December 1950) ===
Chinese forces cross the frozen Yalu River

On 15 October, Truman and MacArthur met at Wake Island. This was much publicized because of MacArthur's discourteous refusal to meet the president in the contiguous US. To Truman, MacArthur speculated there was little risk of Chinese intervention in Korea, and the PRC's opportunity for aiding the KPA had lapsed. He believed the PRC had 300,000 soldiers in Manchuria and 100,000 to 125,000 at the Yalu River. He concluded that, although half of those forces might cross south, "if the Chinese tried to get down to Pyongyang, there would be the greatest slaughter" without Soviet air force protection.

Meanwhile, on 13 October, the Politburo decided China would intervene even without Soviet air support, basing its decision on a belief superior morale could defeat an enemy that had superior equipment.To that end, 200,000 Chinese People's Volunteer Army (PVA) troops crossed the Yalu into North Korea. UN aerial reconnaissance had difficulty sighting PVA units in the daytime, because their march and bivouac discipline minimized detection. The PVA marched "dark-to-dark" and aerial camouflage (concealing soldiers, pack animals, and equipment) was deployed. Meanwhile, daylight advance parties scouted for the next bivouac site. During daylight activity or marching, soldiers remained motionless if an aircraft appeared; PVA officers were under orders to shoot security violators. Such battlefield discipline allowed a three-division army to march the 460 kilometres (286 miles) from An-tung, Manchuria, to the combat zone in 19 days. Another division night-marched a circuitous mountain route, averaging 29 kilometres (18 miles) daily for 18 days.

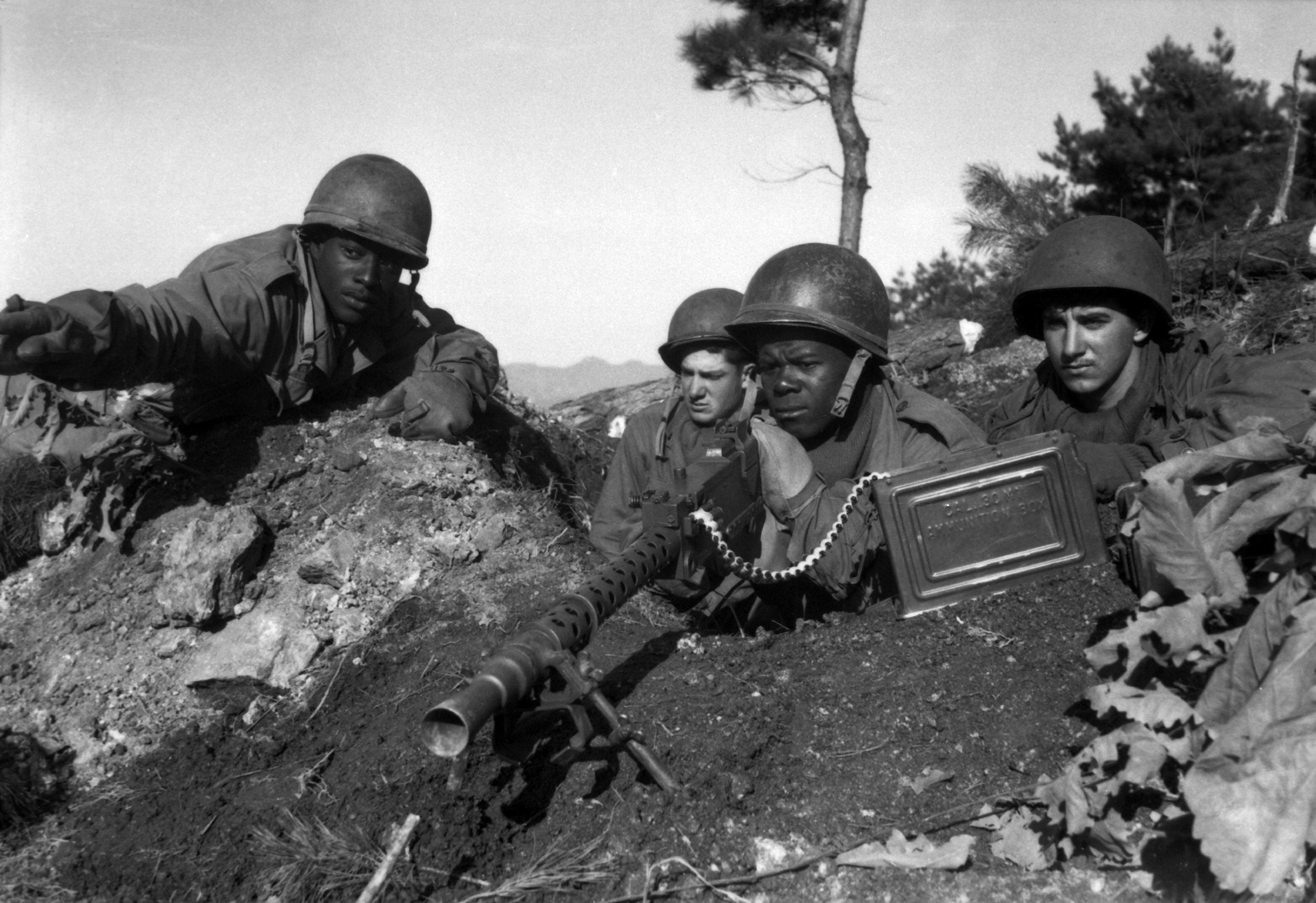
Soldiers from the US 2nd Infantry Division in action near the Ch'ongch'on River (20 November 1950)

After secretly crossing the Yalu River on 19 October, the PVA 13th Army Group launched the First Phase Offensive on 25 October, attacking advancing UN forces near the Sino-Korean border. This decision made solely by China changed the attitude of the Soviet Union. Twelve days after PVA troops entered the war, Stalin allowed the Soviet Air Forces to provide air cover and supported more aid to China. After inflicting heavy losses on the ROK II Corps at the Battle of Onjong, the first confrontation between Chinese and US military occurred on 1 November 1950. Deep in North Korea, thousands of soldiers from the PVA 39th Army encircled and attacked the US 8th Cavalry Regiment with three-prong assaults—from the north, northwest, and west—and overran the defensive position flanks in the Battle of Unsan.

On 13 November, Mao appointed Zhou overall commander and coordinator of the war effort, with Peng Dehuai as field commander. On 25 November, on the Korean western front, the PVA 13th Army Group attacked and overran the ROK II Corps at the Battle of the Ch'ongch'on River, and then inflicted heavy losses on the US 2nd Infantry Division on the UN forces' right flank. Believing they could not hold against the PVA, the Eighth Army began to retreat, crossing the 38th parallel in mid-December.

In the east, on 27 November, the PVA 9th Army Group initiated the Battle of Chosin Reservoir. Here, the UN forces fared better: like the Eighth Army, the surprise attack forced X Corps to retreat from northeast Korea, but they were able to break out from the attempted encirclement by the PVA and execute a successful tactical withdrawal. X Corps established a defensive perimeter at the port city of Hungnam on 11 December and evacuated by December 24, to reinforce the depleted Eighth Army to the south. About 193 shiploads of UN forces and matériel (approximately 105,000 soldiers, 98,000 civilians, 17,500 vehicles, and 350,000 tons of supplies) were evacuated to Pusan. The SS Meredith Victory was noted for evacuating 14,000 refugees, the largest rescue operation by a single ship, even though it was designed to hold 12 passengers. Before escaping, the UN forces razed most of Hungnam, with particular attention to the port. In early December UN forces, including the British Army's 29th Infantry Brigade, evacuated Pyongyang along with refugees.

Around 4.5 million North Koreans are estimated to have fled south or elsewhere abroad. On 16 December, Truman declared a national state of emergency with Proclamation No. 2914, 3 C.F.R. 99 (1953), which remained in force until September 1978. (Note: See 50 U.S.C. S 1601: "All powers and authorities possessed by the President, any other officer or employee of the Federal Government, or any executive agency ... as a result of the existence of any declaration of national emergency in effect on 14 September 1976 are terminated two years from 14 September 1976."; Jolley v. INS, 441 F.2d 1245, 1255 n.17 (5th Cir. 1971).) The next day, 17 December, Kim Il Sung was deprived of the right of command of KPA by China.

=== Bombing of North Korea (November 1950 – July 1953) ===
After Chinese intervention in November 1950, the United Nations Command (UNC) began an extensive bombing campaign against North Korea that lasted until the signing of the Armistice Agreement in July 1953. As Chinese forces compelled UN forces to retreat south and withdraw below the 38th parallel, the major North Korean cities would become targets of the UN Command. "When the United States began to lose after China intervened", the US bombing strategy moved progressively to "urban area bombardments". The US Air Force fighter-bombers began to conduct immense fire raids against entire towns, cities, and villages in North Korea. General Douglas MacArthur ordered the Air Force to "destroy every means of communication, every installation, every factory, city and village" north of Pyongyang.

On 5 November 1950, twenty-one USAF B-29 Superfortress heavy bombers dropped 170 tons of incendiary bombs on the North Korean town of Kanggye, destroying 65% of the town's built-up area. On 8 November, seventy USAF B-29 bombers dropped more than 500 tons of incendiary bombs on Sinuiju, destroying 60% of the city's built-up area, including more than a square-mile area of buildings. By 28 November, "Bomber Command reported that 95% of the town of Manjopin's built-up area was destroyed", as well as for Hoeryong, 90%, Namsi, 90%, Chosan, 85%, Sakchu, 75%, Huichon, 75%, Koindong, 90%, and Uiju, 20%. In incendiary attacks on 3 and 5 January 1951, UN forces burned out 35% of Pyongyang, the capital city of North Korea and the country's largest city. By late 1951, the US Air Force judged that there were no more remaining targets worthy of using the "Tarzon", which was its largest conventional bomb at 12,000 pounds.

On 11 July 1952, Operation Pressure Pump began with practically every operating unit in the Far East conducting an "all-out assault" on Pyongyang, which involved 1,254 air sorties by day and 54 B-29 assaults by night. "In the first attack, the US Air Force flew over 1,200 sorties, losing only three aircraft." On 29 August, an even heavier bombardment was conducted where more than 1,400 sorties were flown over Pyongyang. After the firebombing of Pyongyang, thirty other North Korean cities and industrial objectives were attacked by UN forces in Operation Pressure Pump. During these raids, UN forces used highly concentrated incendiary bombs followed up with delayed demolition explosives.

On January 28, 1953, Charles Erwin Wilson replaced Robert A. Lovett as secretary of defense.

In mid-May 1953, UN bombers attacked three dams: Toksan, Chasan, and Kuwonga.

"The United States dropped 635,000 tons of bombs in Korea (not counting 32,557 tons of napalm), compared to 503,000 tons in the entire Pacific theater in World War II. Whereas sixty Japanese cities were destroyed to an average of 43 percent, estimates of the destruction of towns and cities in North Korea 'ranged from forty to ninety percent'; at least 50 percent of eighteen out of the North's twenty-two major cities were obliterated." A partial list of them includes Pyongyang, 75%, Chongjin, 65%, Hamhung, 80%, Hungnam, 75%, Sariwon, 90%, Sinanju, 100%, and Wonsan, 80%. US Army General Mark W. Clark saw heavy bombing of towns as a means of "undermining the morale of the people of North Korea and their ability to wage and support a war". The Far East Air Force (FEAF) "began incendiary raids against urban areas reminiscent of World War II, and MacArthur spoke of making the remaining territory held by the North Koreans a 'desert'".

=== Fighting around the 38th parallel (January–June 1951) ===
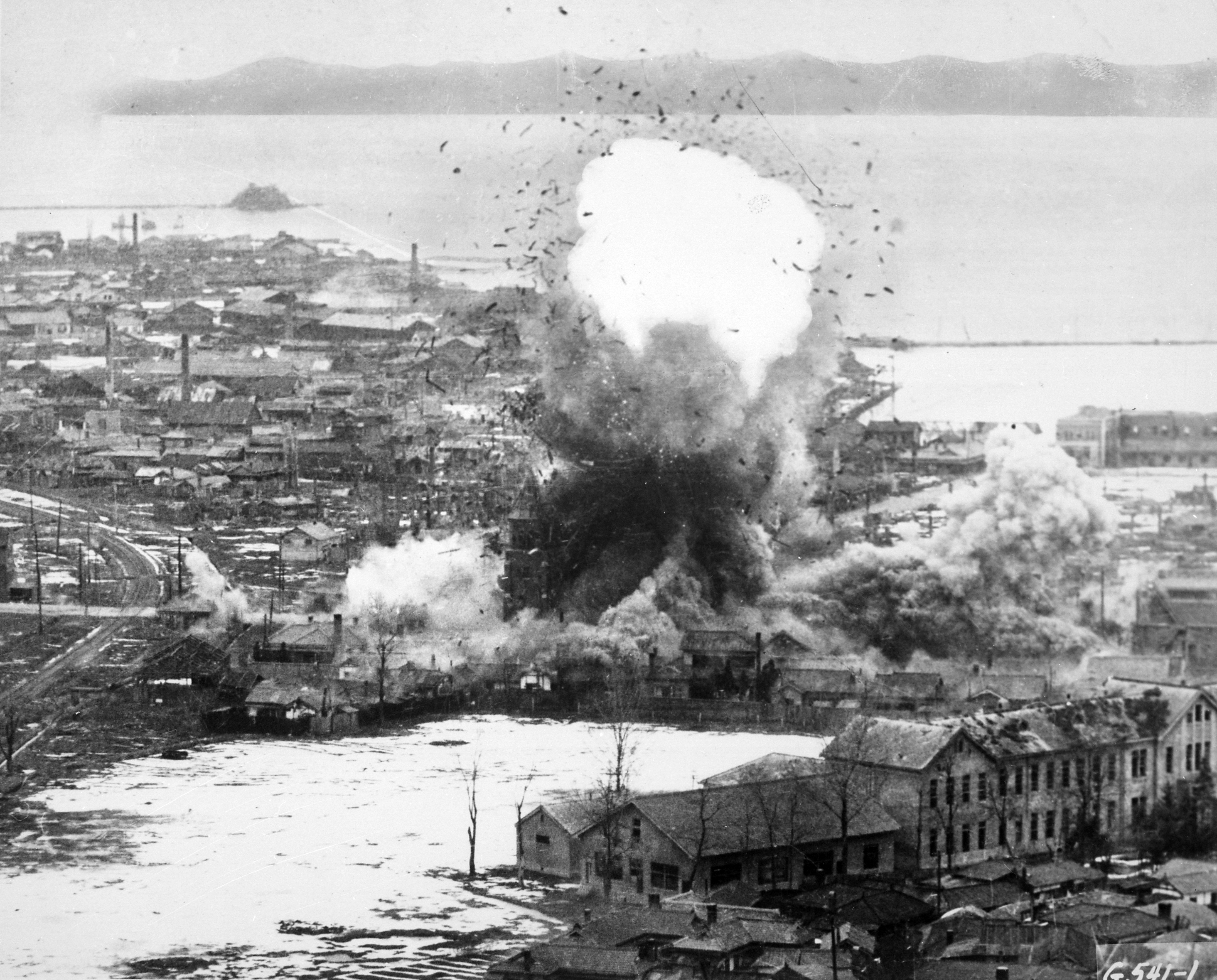
B-26 Invaders bomb logistics depots in Wonsan, North Korea, 1951

A ceasefire presented by the United Nations to the PRC, after the Battle of the Ch'ongch'on River on 11 December, was rejected by the PRC, which was convinced of the PVA's invincibility after its victory in that battle and the wider Second Phase Offensive. With Lieutenant General Matthew Ridgway assuming command of the Eighth Army on 26 December following the death of previous Eighth Army commander Walton Walker, the PVA and the KPA launched their Third Phase Offensive on New Year's Eve. Using night attacks in which UN fighting positions were encircled and assaulted by numerically superior troops, who had the element of surprise, the attacks were accompanied by loud trumpets and gongs, which facilitated tactical communication and disoriented the enemy. UN forces had no familiarity with this tactic, and some soldiers panicked, abandoning their weapons and retreating to the south. The offensive overwhelmed UN forces, allowing the PVA and KPA to capture Seoul for the second time on 4 January 1951.

These setbacks prompted MacArthur to consider using nuclear weapons against the Chinese or North Korean interiors, intending radioactive fallout zones to interrupt the Chinese supply chains. However, upon the arrival of the charismatic General Ridgway, the esprit de corps of the bloodied Eighth Army revived.

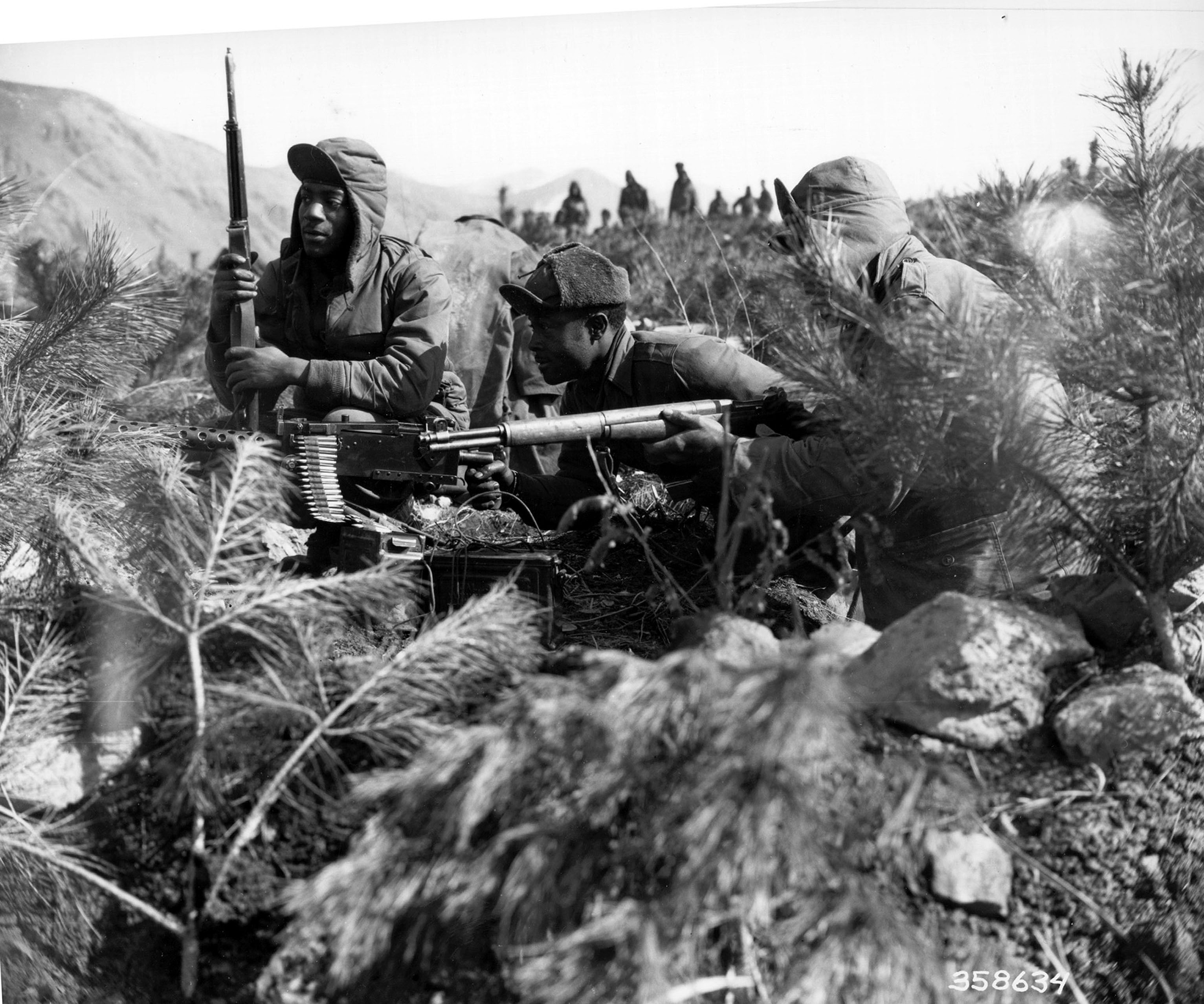
A machine gun crew of Co. A, 24th Infantry Regiment, in Songnimbong, along Han River, 21 February 1951

UN forces retreated to Suwon in the west, Wonju in the center, and the territory north of Samcheok in the east, where the battlefront stabilized. The PVA had outrun its logistics capability and was unable to press on beyond Seoul as food, ammunition, and matériel were carried nightly, on foot and bicycle, from the border at the Yalu River to the battle lines. On 25 January, upon finding that the PVA had abandoned their battle lines, Ridgway ordered a reconnaissance-in-force, which became Operation Thunderbolt. A full-scale advance exploiting the UN's air superiority, concluding with the UN forces reaching the Han River and recapturing Wonju.

Following the failure of ceasefire negotiations in January, the UN General Assembly passed UNGA Resolution 498 on 1 February, condemning the PRC as an aggressor and calling upon its forces to withdraw from Korea.

In early February, the ROK 11th Division ran an operation to destroy guerrillas and pro-DPRK sympathizers in the South Gyeongsang Province. The division and police committed the Geochang and Sancheong–Hamyang massacres. In mid-February, the PVA counterattacked with the Fourth Phase Offensive and achieved victory at Hoengseong. However, the offensive was blunted by US IX Corps at Chipyong-ni in the center. The US 23rd Regimental Combat Team and French Battalion fought a short but desperate battle that broke the attack's momentum. The battle is sometimes known as the "Gettysburg of the Korean War": 5,600 US and French troops were surrounded by 25,000 PVA. UN forces had previously retreated in the face of large PVA/KPA forces instead of getting cut off, but here they stood and won.

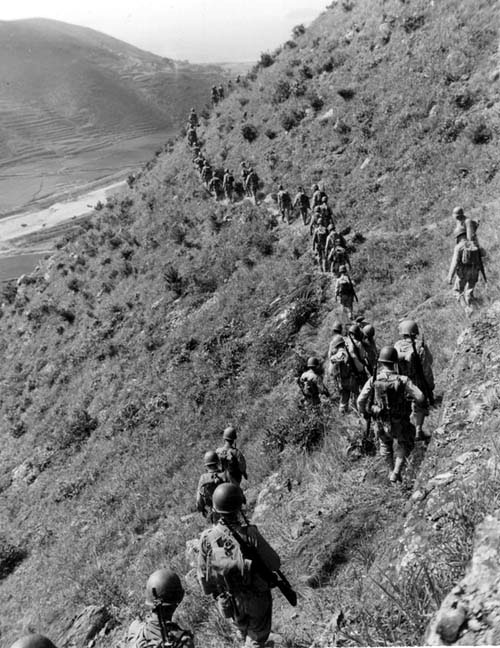
US Marines move out over rugged mountain terrain while closing with North Korean forces

In the last two weeks of February, Operation Thunderbolt was followed by Operation Killer, carried out by the revitalized Eighth Army. It was a full-scale, battlefront-length attack staged for maximum exploitation of firepower to kill as many KPA and PVA troops as possible. Operation Killer concluded with US I Corps reoccupying the territory south of the Han River, and IX Corps capturing Hoengseong. On 7 March, the Eighth Army attacked with Operation Ripper, expelling the PVA and the KPA from Seoul on 14 March. This was the fourth and final conquest of the city in a year, leaving it a ruin; the 1.5 million pre-war population was down to 200,000 and people suffered from food shortages.

On 6 March, MacArthur gave a press conference where he stated "Assuming no diminution of the enemy's flow of ground forces and materiel to the Korean battle area, a continuation of the existing limitation upon our freedom of counter-offensive action, and no major additions to our organizational strength, the battle lines cannot fail in time to reach a point of theoretical stalemate." No one in Washington disputed MacArthur's prediction that a stalemate would develop. But a victory, because of the commitments and risks to achieve it would entail, was no longer considered practical. The preferred course, because it would be consistent with the greater strategy and preparations against the possibility of world war, was to seek a cease-fire and negotiated settlement of Korean issues. On 12 March, Ridgway gave a press conference at his command post at Yoju stating that regaining the 38th parallel would be a "tremendous victory" for the Eighth Army. It would mean the encroachment of communism in Korea had been stopped – exactly what the UNC had set out to accomplish. Conversely, if the Chinese failed to drive the UNC out of Korea, they would have "failed monumentally". In any case, he emphasized, "we didn't set out to conquer China".

In late April, Peng sent his deputy, Hong Xuezhi, to brief Zhou in Beijing. What Chinese soldiers feared, Hong said, was not the enemy, but having no food, bullets, or trucks to transport them to the rear when they were wounded. Zhou attempted to respond to the PVA's logistical concerns by increasing Chinese production and improving supply methods, but these were never sufficient. Large-scale air defense training programs were carried out and the People's Liberation Army Air Force (PLAAF) began participating in the war from September. The Fourth Phase Offensive had not matched the achievements of the Second Phase or the limited gains of the Third Phase. The UN forces, after earlier defeats and retraining, proved much harder to infiltrate by Chinese light infantry than previously. From 31 January to 21 April, the Chinese suffered 53,000 casualties.

On 11 April, Truman relieved General MacArthur as supreme commander for several reasons. MacArthur had crossed the 38th parallel in the mistaken belief China would not enter the war, leading to allied losses. He believed use of nuclear weapons should be his decision, not the president's. MacArthur threatened to destroy China unless it surrendered. While MacArthur felt total victory was the only honorable outcome, Truman was more pessimistic about his chances once involved in a larger war, feeling a truce and orderly withdrawal could be a valid solution. MacArthur was the subject of congressional hearings in May and June 1951, which determined he had defied the president's orders and thus violated the US Constitution. A popular criticism of MacArthur was he never spent a night in Korea and directed the war from the safety of Tokyo.

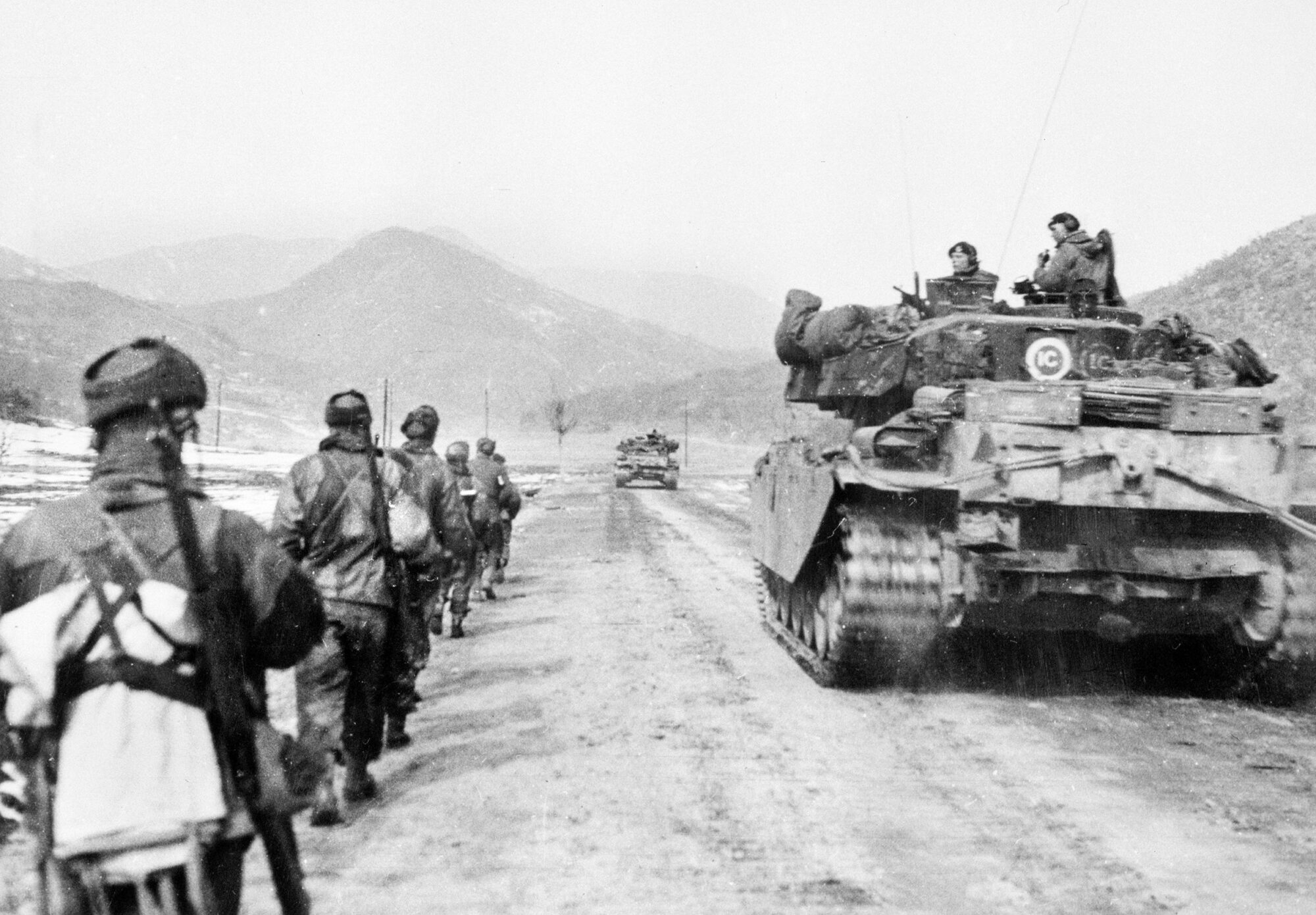
British UN troops advance alongside a Centurion tank, March 1951

Ridgway was appointed supreme commander, and he regrouped the UN forces for successful counterattacks while General James Van Fleet assumed command of the Eighth Army. Further attacks depleted the PVA and KPA forces; Operations Courageous (23–28 March) and Tomahawk (23 March) were joint ground and airborne infiltrations meant to trap PVA forces between Kaesong and Seoul. UN forces advanced to the Kansas Line, north of the 38th parallel.

The PVA counterattacked in April 1951, with the Fifth Phase Offensive, with three field armies (700,000 men). The first thrust of the offensive fell upon I Corps, which fiercely resisted in the Battle of the Imjin River (22–25 April) and Battle of Kapyong (22–25 April), blunting the impetus of the offensive, which was halted at the No-name Line north of Seoul. Casualty ratios were grievously disproportionate; Peng had expected a 2:1 ratio, but Chinese combat casualties from 22 to 29 April totaled between 40,000 and 60,000 compared to only 4,000 for the UN: a ratio between 10:1 and 15:1. By the time Peng had called off the attack in the western sector on 29 April, the three participating armies had lost a third of their front-line combat strength within a week. On 15 May, the PVA commenced the second impulse of the spring offensive and attacked the ROK and US X Corps in the east at the Soyang River. Approximately 370,000 PVA and 114,000 KPA troops had been mobilized, with the bulk attacking in the eastern sector, with about a quarter attempting to pin the I Corps and IX Corps in the western sector. They were halted by 20 May and repulsed, with Western histories designating 22 May as the end of the offensive.

At month's end, the Chinese planned the third step of the Fifth Phase Offensive (withdrawal), which they estimated would take 10–15 days for their 340,000 remaining men, and set the date for 23 May. They were caught off guard when the Eighth Army counterattacked and regained the Kansas Line on 12 May, twenty-three hours before the expected withdrawal. The surprise attack turned the retreat into "the most severe loss since our forces had entered Korea"; between 16 and 23 May, the PVA suffered another 45,000 to 60,000 casualties before their soldiers managed to evacuate. The Fifth Phase Offensive as a whole had cost the PVA 102,000 soldiers (85,000 killed/wounded, 17,000 captured), with significant losses for the KPA.

The end of the Fifth Phase Offensive preceded the UN May–June 1951 counteroffensive. During the counteroffensive, the US-led coalition captured land up to about 10 kilometres (6 miles) north of the 38th parallel, with most forces stopping at the Kansas Line and a minority going to the Wyoming Line. PVA and KPA forces suffered greatly, especially in the Chuncheon sector and at Chiam-ni and Hwacheon; in the latter sector alone the PVA/KPA suffered over 73,207 casualties, including 8,749 captured, compared to 2,647 total casualties of the IX Corps.

The halt at the Kansas Line and offensive action stand-down began the stalemate that lasted until the armistice of 1953. The disastrous failure of the Fifth Phase Offensive "led Chinese leaders to change their goal from driving the UNC out of Korea to merely defending China's security and ending the war through negotiations".

=== Stalemate (July 1951 – July 1953) ===
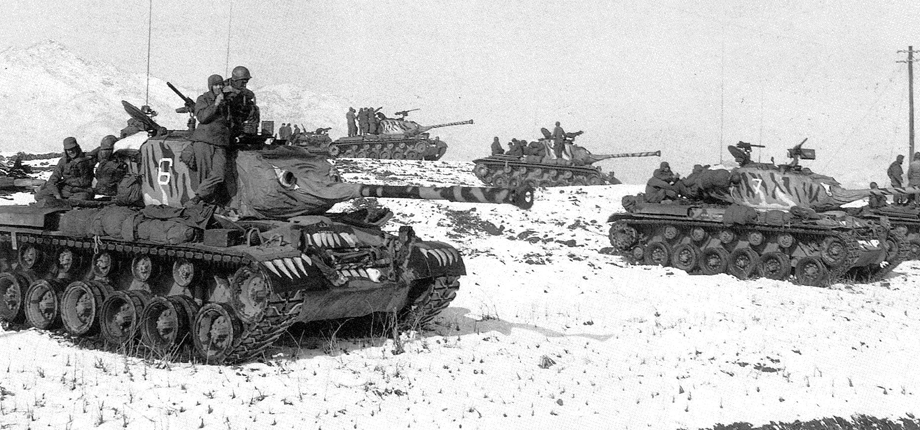
US M46 Patton tanks, painted with tiger heads thought to demoralize Chinese forces

For the rest of the war, the UN and the PVA/KPA fought but exchanged little territory. Large-scale bombing of North Korea continued, and protracted armistice negotiations began on 10 July 1951 at Kaesong in the North. On the Chinese side, Zhou directed peace talks, and Li Kenong and Qiao Guanghua headed the negotiation team. Combat continued; the goal of the UN forces was to recapture all of South Korea and avoid losing territory. The PVA and the KPA attempted similar operations and later effected military and psychological operations to test the UN Command's resolve to continue the war.

The sides constantly traded artillery fire along the front, with American-led forces possessing a large firepower advantage over Chinese-led forces. In the last three months of 1952 the UN fired 3,553,518 field gun shells and 2,569,941 mortar shells, while the communists fired 377,782 field gun shells and 672,194 mortar shells: a 5.8:1 ratio. The communist insurgency, reinvigorated by North Korean support and scattered bands of KPA stragglers, resurged in the south.

In the autumn of 1951, Van Fleet ordered Major General Paik Sun-yup to break the back of guerrilla activity. The UN's limited offensive (31 August – 12 November) to shorten and straighten sections of the lines, acquire better defensive terrain, and deny the enemy key vantage points, saw heavy fighting by UN forces, with I Corps and X Corps making limited tactical advances against PVA and KPA forces. The campaign resulted in approximately 60,000 casualties, including 22,000 Americans. The intense battles at Bloody Ridge, the Punchbowl, and Heartbreak Ridge underscored the challenges of penetrating the Chinese "active defense". Despite PVA/KPA losses of 100,000 to 150,000 troops, these were not crippling, and the PVA forces remained resolute. By November, the UN Command abandoned major offensive operations, and the PVA launched counterattacks with some success. From December 1951 to March 1952, ROK security forces claimed to have killed 11,090 partisans and sympathizers and captured 9,916 more.

PVA troops suffered from deficient military equipment, logistical problems, overextended communication and supply lines, and the constant threat of UN bombers. These factors led to a rate of Chinese casualties far greater than the casualties suffered by UN troops. The situation became so serious that in November 1951 Zhou called a conference in Shenyang to discuss the PVA's logistical problems. It was decided to accelerate the construction of railways and airfields, to increase the trucks available to the army, and to improve air defense by any means possible. These commitments did little to address the problems.

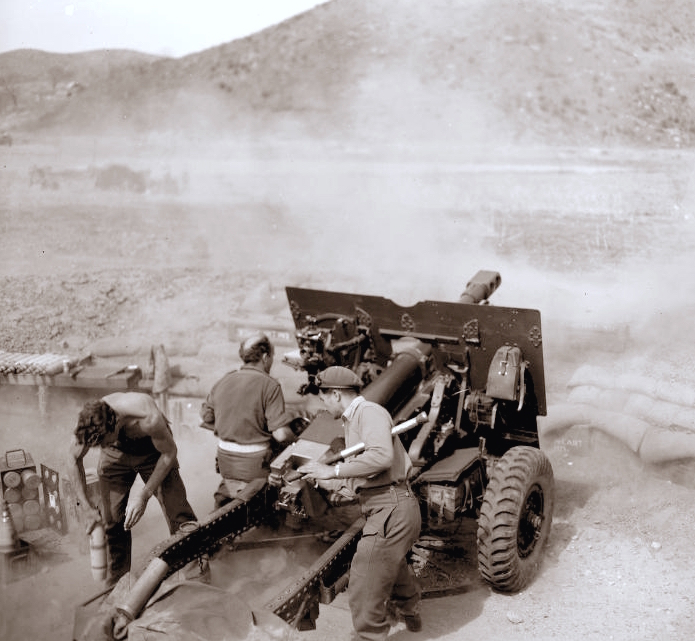
New Zealand artillery crew in action, 1952

In the months after the Shenyang conference, Peng went to Beijing several times to brief Mao and Zhou about the heavy casualties and the increasing difficulty of keeping front lines supplied with basic necessities. Peng was convinced the war would be protracted and that neither side would be able to achieve victory in the near future. On 24 February 1952, the Military Commission, presided over by Zhou, discussed the PVA's logistical problems with members of government agencies. After government representatives emphasized their inability to meet the war demands, Peng shouted: "You have this and that problem ... You should go to the front and see with your own eyes what food and clothing the soldiers have! Not to speak of the casualties! For what are they giving their lives? We have no aircraft. We have only a few guns. Transports are not protected. More and more soldiers are dying of starvation. Can't you overcome some of your difficulties?" The atmosphere became so tense Zhou was forced to adjourn the conference. Zhou called a series of meetings, where it was agreed the PVA would be divided into three groups, to be dispatched to Korea in shifts; to accelerate training of pilots; to provide more anti-aircraft guns to front lines; to purchase more military equipment and ammunition from the Soviet Union; to provide the army with more food and clothing; and to transfer the responsibility of logistics to the central government.

General Mark W. Clark replaced General Ridgway as commander of the UN Command on 12 May 1952.

With peace negotiations ongoing, the Chinese attempted a final offensive in the final weeks of the war to capture territory: on 10 June, 30,000 Chinese troops struck South Korean and US divisions on a 13 kilometres (8 miles) front, and on 13 July, 80,000 Chinese soldiers struck the east-central Kumsong sector, with the brunt of their attack falling on 4 South Korean divisions. The Chinese had success in penetrating South Korean lines but failed to capitalize, particularly when US forces responded with overwhelming firepower. Chinese casualties in their final major offensive (above normal wastage for the front) were about 72,000, including 25,000 killed compared to 14,000 for the UN (most were South Koreans, 1,611 were Americans).

While Chinese forces grappled with significant logistical and supply difficulties, the stalemate also stemmed from mounting frustrations within the UNC. Despite superior firepower, the war proved difficult to fight and the US public was becoming impatient of a war that was lacking a victory. By mid-1951, the stalemate had worn away Truman's public approval, and political pressures mounted on the Truman administration to seek an end to the fighting. By October 1952, Van Fleet alleged he was not receiving sufficient ammunition to continue supporting the American involvement, prompting a public controversy. US Secretary of Defense Robert A. Lovett denied these charges, arguing that shortages were due to army-level logistics rather than a lack of support and mismanagement from the Pentagon or him personally. On 29 November 1952 US President-elect Dwight D. Eisenhower went to Korea to learn what might end the war. Eisenhower took office on 20 January 1953 and his administration prioritized containment over rollback and sought to reduce American involvement in the conflict, contributing to the later armistice.

=== Armistice (July 1953 – November 1954) ===
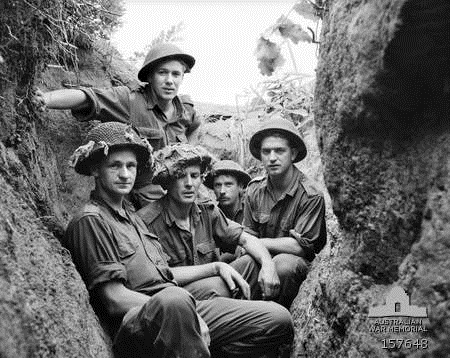
Men from the Royal Australian Regiment, June 1953

The on-again, off-again negotiations for the armistice spanned over two years (1951–1953), first at Kaesong, then Panmunjom. and was the longest negotiated armistice in history. A problematic point was prisoner of war repatriation. The PVA, KPA and UN Command could not agree on a system of repatriation because many PVA and KPA soldiers refused to be repatriated back to the north, which was unacceptable to the Chinese and North Koreans. On 3 December 1952 the UN General Assembly accepted India's proposed Korean War armistice, voted as Resolution 610(VII), and thus was born the Neutral Nations Repatriation Commission.

Stalin died on 5 March. The new Soviet leaders, engaged in their internal power struggle, had no desire to continue supporting China's efforts and called for an end to the hostilities. China could not continue without Soviet aid, and North Korea was no longer a major player. Armistice talks entered a new phase especially after the May 1953 test of the novel nuclear artillery shell by the Americans.

The KPA, PVA and UN Command signed the armistice agreement on 27 July 1953. South Korean President Syngman Rhee refused to sign. The war ended at this point, even though there was no peace treaty. North Korea nevertheless claims it won the war. Under the agreement, the belligerents established the Korean Demilitarized Zone (DMZ) which mostly follows the 38th parallel. In the eastern part, the DMZ runs north of the 38th parallel; to the west, it travels south of it. Kaesong, site of the initial negotiations, was in pre-war South Korea but is now part of North Korea. The DMZ has since been patrolled by the KPA and the ROKA, with the US still operating as the UN Command.

Operation Glory was conducted from July to November 1954, to allow combatants to exchange their dead. The remains of 4,167 US Army and US Marine Corps dead were exchanged for 13,528 KPA and PVA dead, and 546 civilians dead in UN POW camps were delivered to the South Korean government. After Operation Glory, 416 Korean War unknown soldiers were buried in the National Memorial Cemetery of the Pacific, on Oahu, Hawaii. Defense Prisoner of War/Missing Personnel Office (DPMO) records indicate the PRC and North Korea transmitted 1,394 names, of which 858 were correct. From 4,167 containers of returned remains, forensic examination identified 4,219 individuals. Of these, 2,944 were identified as from the US, and all but 416 were identified by name. From 1996 to 2006, North Korea recovered 220 remains near the Sino-Korean border.

=== Continued division (1954–present) ===
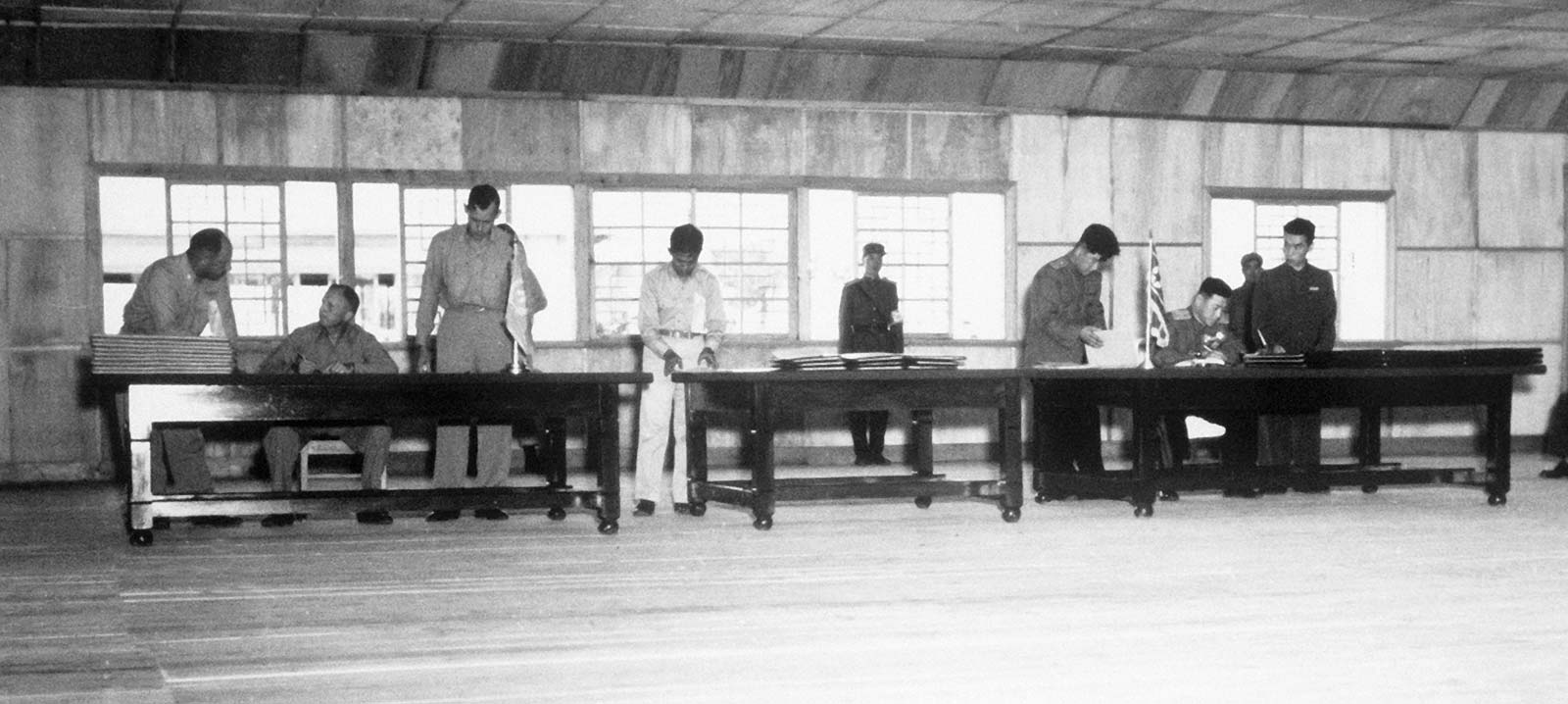
Delegates sign the Korean Armistice Agreement in P'anmunjŏm

The Armistice Agreement provided for monitoring by an international commission. Since 1953, the Neutral Nations Supervisory Commission, composed of members from the Swiss and Swedish armed forces, has been stationed near the Korean Demilitarized Zone.

In April 1975, South Vietnam's capital of Saigon was captured by the People's Army of Vietnam. Encouraged by that communist success, Kim Il-sung saw it as an opportunity to invade South Korea. Kim visited China in April 1975 and met with Mao and Zhou to ask for military aid. Despite Pyongyang's expectations, Beijing refused to help North Korea in another war.

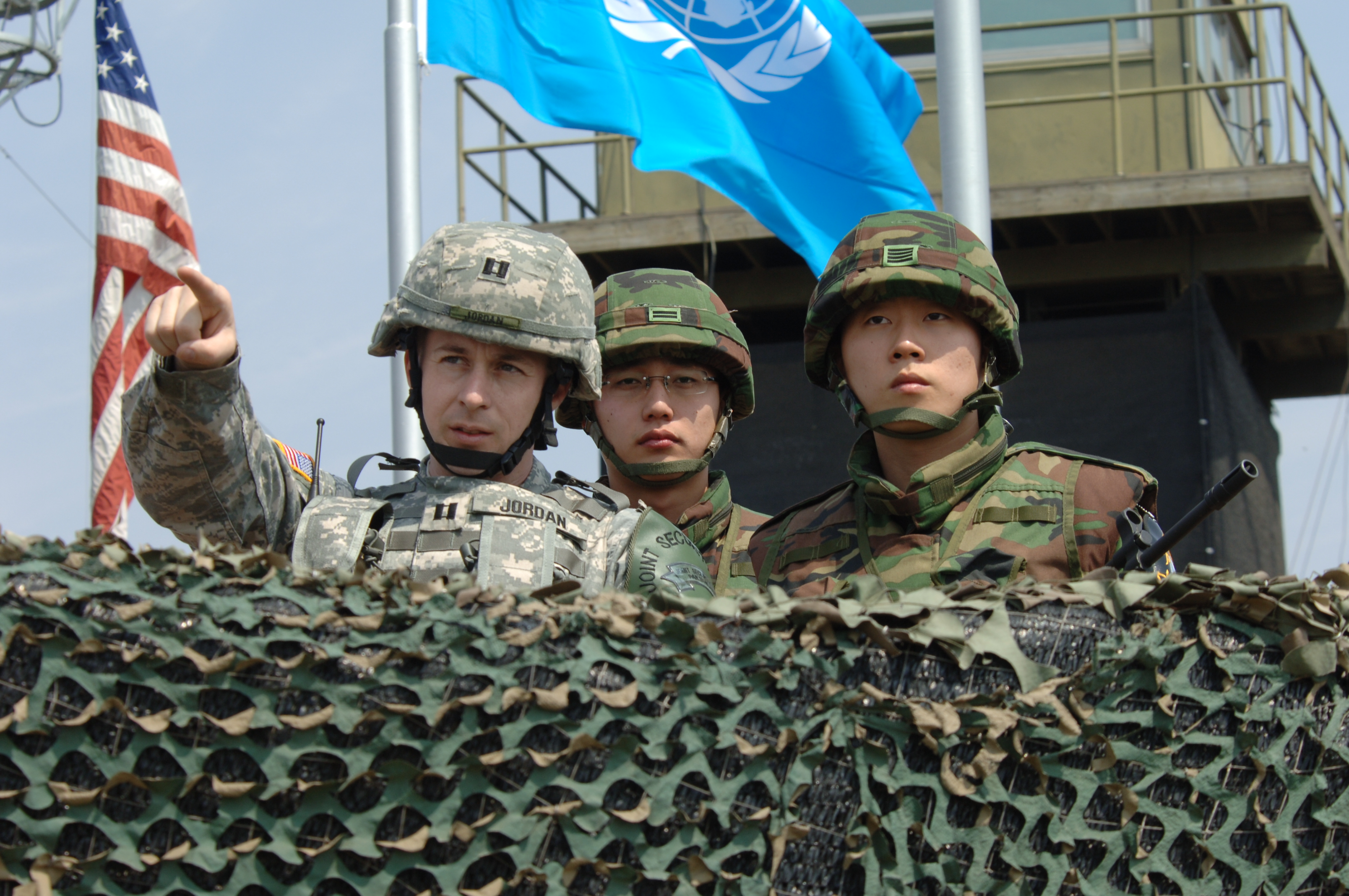
US Army officer confers with South Korean soldiers at Observation Post (OP) Ouellette, viewing northward, in April 2008

Since the armistice, there have been incursions and acts of aggression by North Korea. From 1966 to 1969, many cross-border incursions took place in what has been referred to as the Korean DMZ Conflict or Second Korean War. In 1968, a North Korean commando team unsuccessfully attempted to assassinate South Korean president Park Chung Hee in the Blue House Raid. In 1976, the Korean axe murder incident was widely publicized. Since 1974, four incursion tunnels leading to Seoul have been uncovered. In 2010, a North Korean submarine torpedoed and sank the South Korean corvette ROKS Cheonan, resulting in the deaths of 46 sailors. Again in 2010, North Korea fired artillery shells on Yeonpyeong island, killing two military personnel and two civilians.

After a new wave of UN sanctions, on 11 March 2013, North Korea claimed that the armistice had become invalid. On 13 March, North Korea confirmed it ended the Armistice and declared North Korea "is not restrained by the north–south declaration on non-aggression". On 30 March, North Korea stated it entered a "state of war" and "the long-standing situation of the Korean peninsula being neither at peace nor at war is finally over". Speaking on 4 April, US Secretary of Defense Chuck Hagel said that Pyongyang "formally informed" the Pentagon that it "ratified" the potential use of a nuclear weapon against South Korea, Japan, and the US, including Guam and Hawaii. Hagel stated the US would deploy the Terminal High Altitude Area Defense anti-ballistic missile system to Guam because of a credible and realistic nuclear threat.

In 2016, it was revealed North Korea approached the US about conducting formal peace talks to end the war officially. While the White House agreed to secret peace talks, the plan was rejected because North Korea refused to discuss nuclear disarmament as part of the treaty. In 2018, it was announced that North Korea and South Korea agreed to talk to end the conflict. They committed themselves to the complete denuclearization of the Peninsula. North Korean leader Kim Jong-un and South Korean President Moon Jae-in signed the Panmunjom Declaration. In September 2021, Moon reiterated his call to end the war formally, in a speech at the UN.

== Characteristics ==
The ground war saw armored offensives with the North's invasion and UN operations, and tunnel warfare by Chinese forces. The air war saw the first large jet aircraft battles, and an early use of US nuclear deterrence.

=== Armored warfare ===
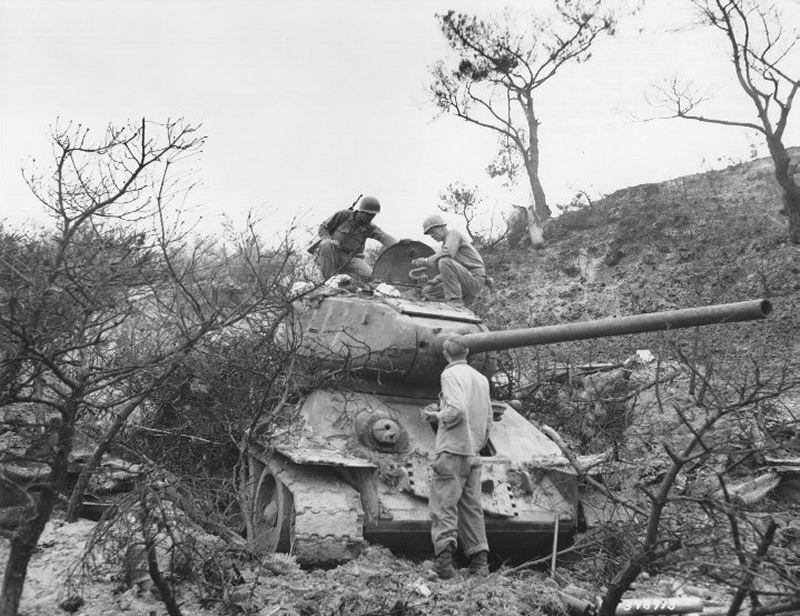
US soldiers of the 5th Cavalry Regiment examine a captured North Korean T-34 tank, Waegwan, eastern South Korea

The initial assault by KPA forces was aided by the use of Soviet T-34-85 tanks. A KPA tank corps equipped with about 120 T-34s spearheaded the invasion. These faced an ROK that had few anti-tank weapons adequate to deal with the T-34s. Additional Soviet armor was added as the offensive progressed. The KPA tanks had a good deal of early successes against ROK infantry, Task Force Smith, and the US M24 Chaffee light tanks that they encountered. Interdiction by ground attack aircraft was the only means of slowing the advancing KPA armor. The tide turned in favor of the UN forces in August 1950 when the KPA suffered major tank losses during a series of battles in which the UN forces brought heavier equipment to bear, including American M4A3 Sherman and M26 medium tanks, alongside British Centurion, Churchill, and Cromwell tanks.

The Incheon landings on 15 September cut off the KPA supply lines, causing their armored forces and infantry to run out of fuel, ammunition, and other supplies. As a result of this and the Pusan perimeter breakout, the KPA had to retreat, and many of the T-34s and heavy weapons had to be abandoned. By the time the KPA withdrew from the South, 239 T-34s, and 74 SU-76 self-propelled guns were lost. After November 1950, KPA armor was rarely encountered. Following the initial assault by the North, the Korean War saw limited use of tanks and featured no large-scale tank battles. The mountainous, forested terrain, especially in the eastern central zone, was poor tank country, limiting their mobility. Through the last two years of the war in Korea, UN tanks served largely as infantry support and mobile artillery pieces.

=== Aerial warfare ===
==== Air-to-ground operations ====
Following the North Korean invasion, the UN Command (UNC) began an extensive bombing campaign against North Korea that lasted until the end of the war in July 1953. It was the first major bombing campaign for the US Air Force (USAF) since its inception in 1947 from the US Army Air Forces (USAAF). The air-to-ground attacks "ranged from the widespread and continual use of firebombing to threats to use nuclear and chemical weapons, finally to the destruction of huge North Korean dams in the last stages of the war."

The first bombing attack on North Korea was approved on the fourth day of the war MacArthur immediately upon request by the Commanding General of the Far East Air Forces (FEAF), George E. Stratemeyer. Massive incendiary attacks began in late July. US airpower conducted 7,000 close support and interdiction airstrikes that month, which helped slow the North Korean rate of advance to 3 kilometres (2 miles) per day.

North Korea ranks as among the most heavily bombed countries in history, and the United States dropped a total of 635,000 tons of bombs (including 32,557 tons of napalm) on Korea, more than during the entire Pacific War. Almost every substantial building in North Korea was destroyed during the war. The war's highest-ranking US prisoner-of-war, Major General William F. Dean, reported that the majority of North Korean cities and villages he saw were either rubble or snow-covered wasteland. Dean Rusk, a supporter of the war and later US Secretary of State, said the United States bombed "everything that moved in North Korea, every brick standing on top of another". Hydroelectric and irrigation dams were bombed in the later stages of the war, flooding farmland and destroying crops. North Korean factories, schools, hospitals, and government offices were forced to move underground, and air defenses were "non-existent".

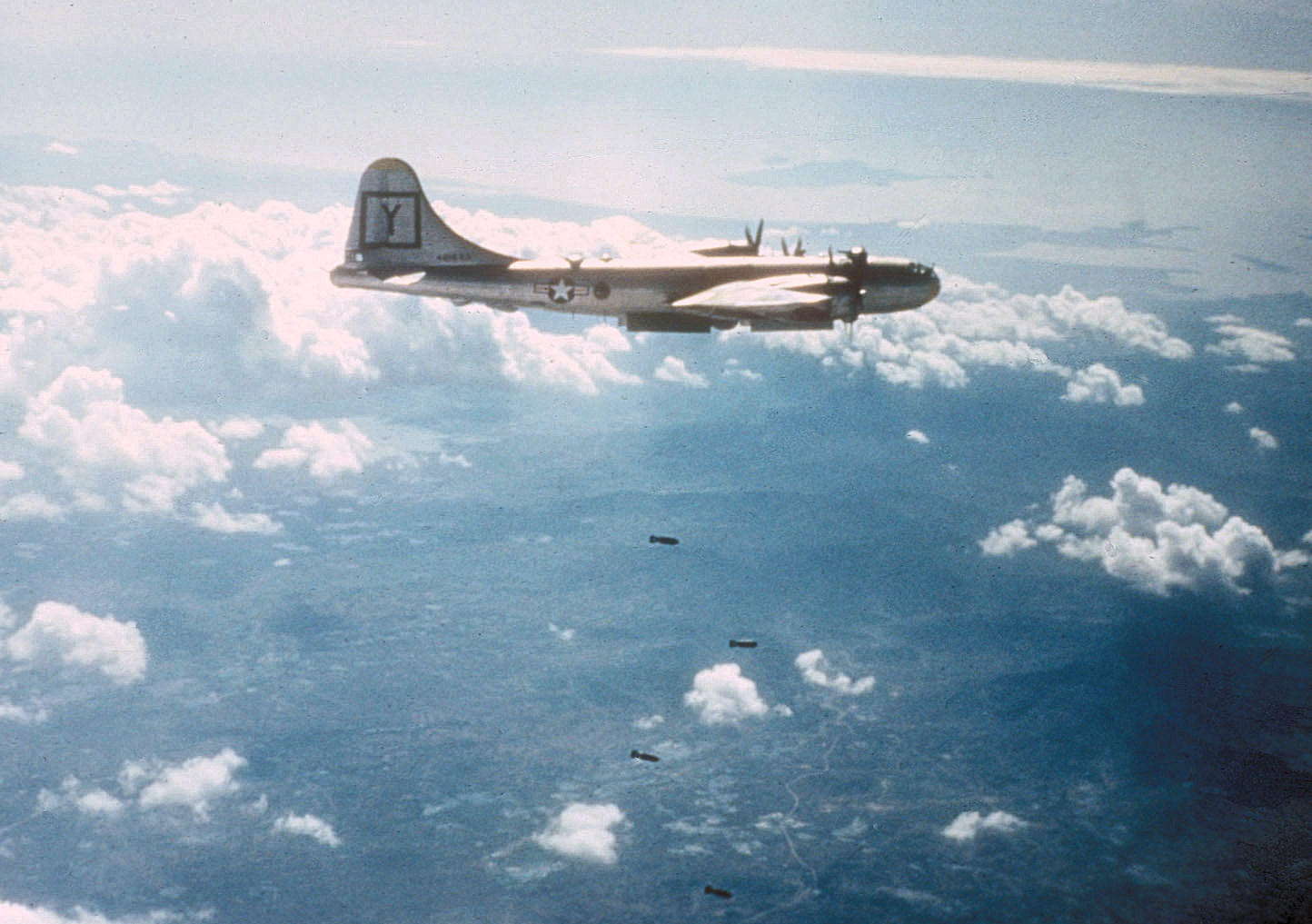
A 307th Bomb Group B-29 on a day-bombing mission in Korea, c. 1951

According to a Chosun Ilbo report in 2001, a report by Soviet ambassador and chief military adviser to North Korea, Lieutenant General V. N. Razuvaev, estimated 282,000 North Korean deaths in bombing raids during the war. In an interview with Air Force historians in 1988, USAF General Curtis LeMay commented on efforts to win the war as a whole, including the strategic bombing campaign, saying "Right at the start of the war, unofficially, I slipped a message in 'under the carpet' in the Pentagon that we ought to turn SAC lose with some incendiaries on some North Korean towns. The answer came back, under the carpet again, that there would be too many civilian casualties; we couldn't do anything like that. We went over there and fought the war and eventually burned down every town in North Korea anyway, some way or another, and some in South Korea, too ... Over a period of three years or so we killed off, what, 20 percent of the population of Korea, as direct casualties of war or from starvation and exposure? Over a period of three years, this seemed to be acceptable to everybody, but to kill a few people at the start right away, no, we can't seem to stomach that."

General Matthew Ridgway said that except for air power, "the war would have been over in 60 days with all Korea in Communist hands". UN Command air forces flew 1,040,708 combat and combat support sorties during the Korean War. The FEAF flew the majority of sorties at 710,886 (69.3% of sorties), with the US Navy performing 16.1%, the US Marine Corps 10.3%, and 4.3% by other allied air forces.

Over the course of the war, USAF B-29 Superfortress heavy bombers flew 20,000 sorties and dropped 220,000 tons in Korea. At first, the bomber was used in strategic day-bombing missions, although North Korea's few strategic targets and industries were quickly destroyed. Future B-29 bombing raids were then restricted to night missions, justified as largely in a supply-interdiction role. The B-29 Superfortresses dropped the VB-3 "Razon" (1,000-pound explosives) and the VB-13 "Tarzon" (12,000-pound bombs) in Korea, mostly for demolishing major bridges, like the ones across the Yalu River, and for attacks on dams. The aircraft also was used for numerous leaflet drops in North Korea, such as those for Operation Moolah.

A Superfortress of the 91st Strategic Reconnaissance Squadron flew the last B-29 mission of the war on 27 July 1953.

==== Air-to-air operations ====
The Korean War was the first in which jet aircraft played the central role in air combat. Once-formidable fighters such as the P-51 Mustang, F4U Corsair, and Hawker Sea Fury — all piston-engined, propeller-driven, and designed during World War II — relinquished their air-superiority roles to a new generation of faster, jet-powered fighters arriving in the theater. For the initial months of the war, the P-80 Shooting Star, F9F Panther, Gloster Meteor, and other jets under the UN flag dominated the Korean People's Air Force (KPAF) propeller-driven Soviet Yakovlev Yak-9, and Lavochkin La-9s. By early August 1950, the KPAF was reduced to only about 20 planes.

Chinese intervention in late October 1950 bolstered the KPAF with the MiG-15, one of the world's most advanced jet fighters. The USAF countered the MiG-15 by sending over three squadrons of its most capable fighter, the F-86 Sabre, which arrived in December 1950. The Soviet Union denied the involvement of their personnel in anything other than an advisory role, but air combat quickly resulted in Soviet pilots dropping their code signals and speaking over the radio in Russian. This known direct Soviet participation was a casus belli that the UN Command deliberately overlooked, lest the war expand to include the Soviet Union and potentially escalate into atomic warfare.

After the Korean War and to the present day, the US Air Force reported an inflated F-86 Sabre kill ratio in excess of 10:1, with 792 MiG-15s and 108 other aircraft shot down by Sabres, and 78 Sabres lost to enemy fire. The Soviet Air Force reported some 1,100 air-to-air victories and 335 MiG combat losses, while China's PLAAF reported 231 combat losses, mostly MiG-15s, and 168 other aircraft lost. The KPAF reported no data, but the UN Command estimates some 200 KPAF aircraft lost in the war's first stage, and 70 additional aircraft after the Chinese intervention. The USAF disputes Soviet and Chinese claims of 650 and 211 downed F-86s, respectively. More modern American estimates place the overall USAF kill ratio at around 1.8:1 with the ratio dropping to 1.3:1 against MiG-15s with Soviet pilots but increasing to a dominant 12:1 against Chinese and North Korean adversaries.

Reports by Lieutenant General Sidor Slyusarev, commander of Soviet air forces in Korea, are more favorable to the communist side. The 64th Corps claimed a total 1,097 enemy aircraft of all types during operations, for the loss of 335 aircraft (including lost to enemy ground fire, accidents, etc.) and 110 pilots. Soviet reports put the overall kill ratio at 3.4:1 in favor of Soviet pilots. As reported, effectiveness of the Soviet fighters declined as the war progressed. from an overall kill ratio of 7.9:1 from November 1950 through January 1952, declining to 2.2:1 in later 1952 and 1.9:1 in 1953. This was because more advanced jet fighters appeared on the UN side as well as improved US tactics.

Regardless of the actual ratio, American Sabres were very effective at controlling the skies over Korea. Since no other UN fighter could contend with the MiG-15, F-86s largely took over air combat once they arrived, relegating other aircraft to air-to-ground operations. Despite much greater numbers (the number of Sabres in theater never exceeded 150 while MiG-15s reached 900 at their peak), communist aircraft were seldom encountered south of Pyongyang. UN ground forces, supply lines, and infrastructure were not attacked from the air. Although North Korea had 75 airfields capable of supporting MiGs, after 1951, any serious effort to operate from them was abandoned. The MiGs were instead based across the Yalu River in the safety of China. This confined most air-to-air engagements to MiG Alley. UN aircraft had free rein to conduct strike missions over enemy territory with little fear of interception. Although jet dogfights are remembered as a prominent part of the Korean War, counter-air missions comprised just 12% of Far East Air Forces sorties, and four times as many sorties were performed for close air support and interdiction.

The war marked a major milestone not only for fixed-wing aircraft, but also for rotorcraft, featuring the first large-scale deployment of helicopters for medical evacuation (medevac). In 1944–45, during World War II, the YR-4 helicopter had seen limited ambulance duty. In Korea, where rough terrain prevented use of the jeep as a speedy medevac vehicle, helicopters like the Sikorsky H-19 were heavily used. This helped reduce fatal casualties to a dramatic degree when combined with complementary medical innovations such as Mobile Army Surgical Hospitals (MASH). As such, the medical evacuation and care system for the wounded was so effective for the UN forces that a wounded soldier who arrived at a MASH unit alive typically had a 97% chance of survival. The limitations of jet aircraft for close air support highlighted the helicopter's potential in the role, leading to the development of the helicopter gunships used in the Vietnam War.

=== Naval warfare ===
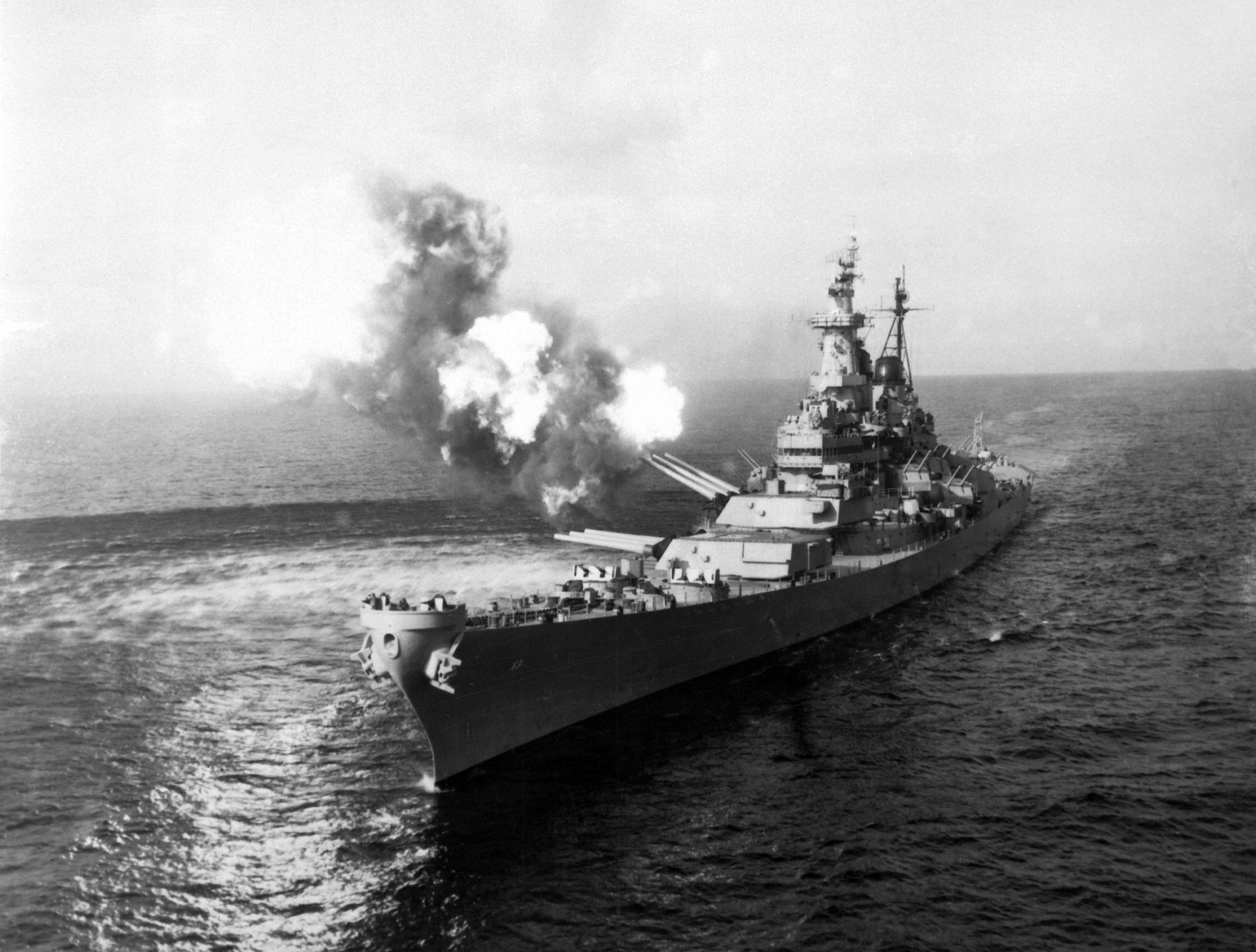
To disrupt North Korean communications, USS Missouri fires a salvo from its 16-inch guns at shore targets near Chongjin, North Korea, 21 October 1950

Because neither Korea had a significant navy, the war featured few naval battles. A skirmish between North Korea and the UN Command occurred on 2 July 1950; the US Navy cruiser USS Juneau, the Royal Navy cruiser HMS Jamaica and the Royal Navy frigate HMS Black Swan fought four North Korean torpedo boats and two mortar gunboats, and sank them. USS Juneau later sank several ammunition ships that had been present. The last sea battle of the Korean War occurred days before the Battle of Incheon; the ROK ship PC-703 sank a North Korean minelayer in the Battle of Haeju Island, near Incheon. Three other supply ships were sunk by PC-703 two days later in the Yellow Sea.

During most of the war, the UN navies patrolled the west and east coasts of North Korea, sinking supply and ammunition ships and denying the North Koreans the ability to resupply from the sea. Aside from very occasional gunfire from North Korean shore batteries, the main threat to UN navy ships was from magnetic mines. During the war, five US Navy ships were lost to mines: two minesweepers, two minesweeper escorts, and one ocean tug. Mines and coastal artillery damaged another 87 US warships.

=== Tunnel warfare ===
Tunnel warfare was favored by Chinese and North Korean forces as a response to US-led aerial attacks. "The Chinese resort to tunnel warfare, and the devastating losses to American soldiers, led to the sealing of tunnel entrances by the UN Command. According to later prisoner of war interrogations, Chinese officers had killed a number of their own soldiers in the tunnels, because the latter had wished to dig their way out and surrender to the UN Command."

The Chinese People's Volunteer Army under General Qin Jiwei constructed an intricate series of defensive networks, which were composed of 9,000 meters (9,800 yd) of tunnels, 50,000 meters (55,000 yd) of trenches, and 5,000 meters (5,500 yd) of obstacles and minefields. This tunnel network proved its use in the Battle of Triangle Hill in October and November 1952, where, despite the US Eighth Army enjoying complete air and artillery superiority, the Chinese managed to keep the hill and inflict heavy casualties on the Americans.

=== US threat of atomic warfare ===
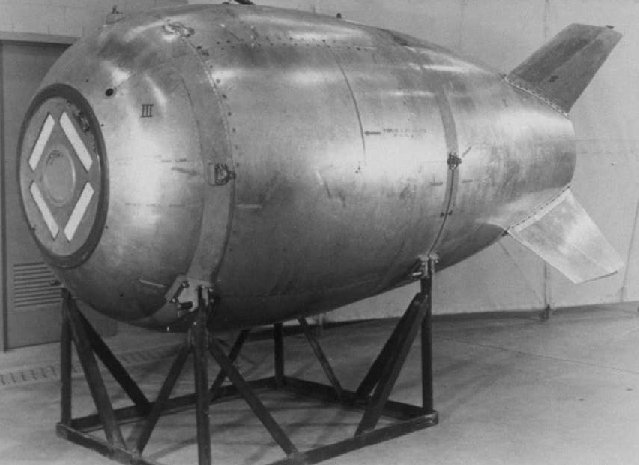
Mark 4 bomb, seen on display, transferred to the 9th Bombardment Wing, Heavy

On 5 November 1950, the US Joint Chiefs of Staff issued orders for the retaliatory atomic bombing of Manchurian PRC military bases, if either of their armies crossed into Korea or if PRC or KPA bombers attacked Korea from there. Truman ordered the transfer of nine Mark 4 nuclear bombs "to the Air Force's Ninth Bomb Group, the designated carrier of the weapons ... [and] signed an order to use them against Chinese and Korean targets", which he never transmitted.

Many US officials viewed the deployment of nuclear-capable (but not nuclear-armed) B-29 bombers to Britain as helping to resolve the Berlin Blockade of 1948–49. Truman and Eisenhower had military experience and viewed nuclear weapons as potentially usable. During Truman's first meeting to discuss the war in June 1950, he ordered plans for attacking Soviet forces if they entered the war. By July, Truman approved another B-29 deployment to Britain, this time with bombs, to remind the Soviets of US offensive ability. Deployment of a similar fleet to Guam was leaked to the New York Times. As UN forces retreated to Pusan, and the CIA reported that China was building up forces for a possible invasion of Taiwan, the Pentagon believed Congress and the public would demand using nuclear weapons if the situation in Korea required them.

As PVA forces pushed back the UN forces from the Yalu River, Truman stated during a 30 November 1950 press conference that using nuclear weapons was "always [under] active consideration", with control under the local commander. Indian ambassador K. Madhava Panikkar reports "that Truman announced he was thinking of using the atom bomb in Korea. But the Chinese seemed unmoved by this threat ... The PRC's propaganda against the US was stepped up. The 'Aid Korea to resist America' campaign was made the slogan for increased production, greater national integration, and more rigid control over anti-national activities. One could not help feeling that Truman's threat came in useful to the leaders of the Revolution...."

After his statement caused concern in Europe, on 4 December Truman met with UK Prime Minister and Commonwealth spokesman Clement Attlee, and French Premier René Pleven to discuss their worries about atomic warfare and its likely continental expansion. The US's foregoing atomic warfare was not because of "a disinclination by the Soviet Union and People's Republic of China to escalate", but because UN allies—notably the UK, the Commonwealth, and France—were concerned about a geopolitical imbalance rendering NATO defenseless while the US fought China, who might persuade the Soviet Union to conquer Western Europe. The Joint Chiefs of Staff advised Truman to tell Attlee that the US would use nuclear weapons only if necessary to protect an evacuation of UN troops, or prevent a "major military disaster".

On 6 December after the Chinese intervention repelled the UN armies from northern North Korea, General J. Lawton Collins, General MacArthur, Admiral C. Turner Joy, General George E. Stratemeyer and Major General Doyle Hickey, Major General Charles A. Willoughby, and Major General Edwin K. Wright met in Tokyo to plan strategy countering the Chinese intervention; they considered three atomic warfare scenarios encompassing the next weeks and months.

- 1: If the PVA continued attacking in full and the UNC was forbidden to blockade and bomb China, and without Taiwanese reinforcements, and without an increase in US forces until April 1951, then atomic bombs might be used in North Korea.
- 2: If the PVA continued full attacks and the UNC blockaded China and had effective aerial reconnaissance and bombing of the Chinese interior, and the Taiwanese soldiers were maximally exploited, and tactical atomic bombing was to hand, then UN forces could hold positions deep in North Korea.
- 3: If China agreed not to cross the 38th parallel border, MacArthur would recommend UN acceptance of an armistice disallowing PVA and KPA troops south of the parallel, and requiring PVA and KPA guerrillas to withdraw northwards. The Eighth Army would remain to protect the Seoul–Incheon area, while X Corps would retreat to Pusan. A UN commission should supervise implementation of the armistice.

The Pentagon and State Department were cautious about using nuclear weapons because of the risk of general war with China. Truman and his advisors agreed and never seriously considered using them in early December 1950, despite the poor military situation in Korea.

In 1951, the US escalated closest to atomic warfare in Korea. Because China deployed new armies to the Sino-Korean frontier, ground crews at the Kadena Air Base, Okinawa, assembled atomic bombs, "lacking only the essential pit nuclear cores". In October 1951, the US effected Operation Hudson Harbor to establish a nuclear weapons capability. B-29 bombers practiced individual bombing runs from Okinawa to North Korea (using dummy bombs). Hudson Harbor tested "actual functioning of all activities which would be involved in an atomic strike, including weapons assembly and testing, leading, [and] ground control of bomb aiming". The data indicated that atomic bombs would be tactically ineffective against massed infantry, because the "timely identification of large masses of enemy troops was extremely rare".

Ridgway was authorized to use nuclear weapons if a major air attack originated from outside Korea. An envoy was sent to Hong Kong to deliver a warning to China. The message likely caused China to be more cautious about potential US use of nuclear weapons, but whether they learned about the B-29 deployment is unclear, and the failure of Chinese offensives that month likely was what caused them to shift to a defensive strategy. The B-29s returned to the US in June.

Despite the greater destructive power atomic weapons would bring, their effect on determining the war's outcome would have likely been minimal. Given the dispersed nature of PVA/KPA forces, the relatively primitive infrastructure for staging and logistics centers, and the small number of bombs available (most would have been conserved for use against the Soviets), atomic attacks would have limited effects against the ability of China to move forces. Attacking Chinese cities to destroy industry and infrastructure would cause immediate dispersion of the leadership and give propaganda to the communists to galvanize support. Since the Soviets were not expected to intervene with their few atomic weapons, the threat of nuclear exchange was unimportant in the decision not to deploy atomic bombs. Their use offered little operational advantage and would undesirably lower the "threshold" for using atomic weapons against non-nuclear states in future conflicts.

When Eisenhower succeeded Truman in 1953, he was similarly cautious about using nuclear weapons in Korea. Kenneth Nichols wrote that President Eisenhower "ended the Korean hostilities by discreetly threatening to use atomic weapons if the North Koreans and the Chinese did not agree to a cessation of hostilities". The administration prepared contingency plans to use them against China, but like Truman, he feared doing so would result in Soviet attacks on Japan. The war ended as it began, without US. nuclear weapons deployed.

== Casualties ==
About 3 million people were killed in the war, mostly civilians, making it perhaps the deadliest conflict of the Cold War era. Samuel Kim lists the Korean War as the deadliest conflict in East Asia, and the region most affected by armed conflict related to the Cold War.

=== Civilian ===
Though only rough estimates of civilian fatalities are available, scholars have noted that the percentage of civilian casualties in Korea was higher than in World War II or the Vietnam War, with historian Bruce Cumings putting civilian casualties at 2 million and Guenter Lewy in the range of 2–3 million. According to one source, 1,658,436 civilians died, meaning a 74% civilian death rate.

Cumings states that civilians represent at least half the war's casualties, while Lewy suggests it may have gone as high as 70%, compared to his estimates of 42% in World War II and 30 to 46% in Vietnam. Data compiled by the Peace Research Institute Oslo lists just under 1 million battle deaths over the war and a mid-estimate of 3 million total deaths, attributing the difference to excess mortality among civilians from one-sided massacres, starvation, and disease. Compounding this devastation for civilians, virtually all major cities on the Peninsula were destroyed. In per capita and absolute terms, North Korea was the most devastated by the war. According to Charles K. Armstrong, the war resulted in the death of an estimated 12 to 15% of the North Korean population (c. 10 million), "a figure close to or surpassing the proportion of Soviet citizens killed in World War II".

According to the South Korean Ministry of National Defense, there were over 750,000 confirmed violent civilian deaths during the war, another million civilians were pronounced missing, and millions more ended up as refugees. The UN Command estimated that 5 million Koreans (both north and south) had left their homes and become refugees (including internally displaced) by the summer of 1951. Over 1.5 million North Koreans fled to the South.

=== Military ===
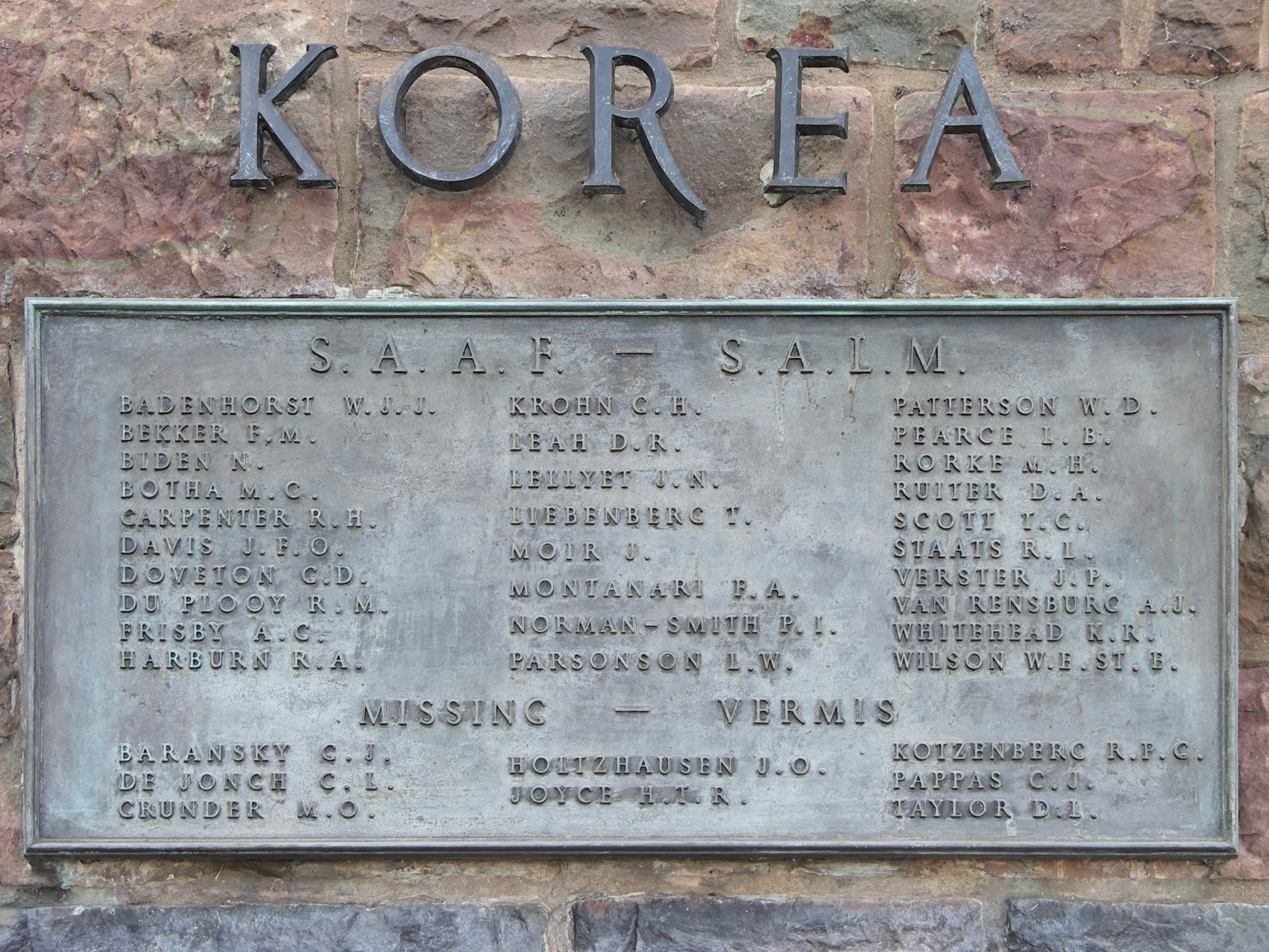
Korean War memorials are found in every UN Command Korean War participant country; this one is in Pretoria, South Africa

==== ROK-UN Losses ====
South Korea originally reported 137,899 military deaths and 24,495 missing, 450,742 wounded, and 8,343 prisoners. The South Korean government later stated an official tally of 184,573 killed or missing in action, with about 257,000 military deaths in total from all causes. Historian Max Hastings estimates South Korean casualties higher at 415,000 killed and 429,000 wounded.

The United States suffered 33,739 deaths in battle, including those missing and declared dead, and 2,835 non-battle deaths. There were 17,730 other non-battle US military deaths outside Korea during the same period erroneously included as war deaths until 2000. The US government estimates that 103,284 American soldiers were wounded in action, with another 10,218 that were captured by Communist forces or went missing in action. 1,789,000 American soldiers served in the war, accounting for 31% of the 5,720,000 Americans who served on active duty worldwide from 1950 to 1953.

American combat casualties were over 90% of non-Korean UN losses. US battle deaths were 8,516 up to their first engagement with the Chinese on 1 November 1950. The first four months prior to the Chinese intervention were by far the bloodiest per day for US forces, as they engaged the well-equipped KPA in intense fighting. American medical records show that from July to October 1950, the army sustained 31% of the combat deaths it ultimately incurred in the entire 37-month war. 45% of American casualties would be incurred after the first armistice negotiations with the Communists took place.

Deaths from non-American militaries for the UN Command totaled 3,730, with another 379 missing.

Breakdown of UN casualties
- United Kingdom:
  1,109 dead
  2,674 wounded
  179 MIA
  977 POW
- Turkey:
  741 dead
  2,068 wounded
  163 MIA
  244 POW
- Canada:
  516 dead
  1,042 wounded
  1 MIA
  33 POW
- Australia:
  339 dead
  1,216 wounded
  43 MIA
  26 POW
- France:
  262 dead
  1,008 wounded
  7 MIA
  12 POW
- Greece
  192 dead
  543 wounded
  3 POW
- Colombia:
  163 dead
  448 wounded
  28 POW
- Thailand:
  129 dead
  1,139 wounded
  5 MIA
- Ethiopia
  121 dead
  536 wounded
- Netherlands:
  122 dead
  645 wounded
  3 MIA
- Belgium:
  101 dead
  478 wounded
  5 MIA
  1 POW
- Philippines:
  92 dead
  299 wounded
  97 MIA/POW
- Japan:
  79 dead
- South Africa:
  34 dead
  9 POW
- New Zealand:
  34 dead
  299 wounded
  1 MIA/POW
- Norway:
  3 dead
- Luxembourg:
  2 dead
  13 wounded
- India:
  1 dead

The Chinese and North Koreans claimed that about 390,000 soldiers from the US, 660,000 soldiers from South Korea and 29,000 other UN soldiers were "eliminated" from the battlefield.

==== Communist Losses ====
Chinese sources reported that the PVA suffered 114,000 battle deaths, 21,000 deaths from wounds, 13,000 deaths from illness, 340,000 wounded, and 7,600 missing. 7,110 Chinese POWs were repatriated to China. In 2010, the Chinese government revised its official tally of war losses to 183,108 dead (114,084 in combat, 70,000 deaths from wounds, illness and other causes) and 25,621 missing, a total of 208,729 dead or missing. In 2020, Chinese state media outlet China Daily reported the number of Chinese soldiers killed in the war at 197,653. Chinese soldiers who served in Korea faced a greater chance of being killed or wounded than those who served in World War II or the Chinese Civil War.

According to the South Korean Ministry of National Defense, North Korean military losses totaled 294,151 dead, 91,206 missing, and 229,849 wounded, giving North Korea the highest military deaths of any belligerent in absolute and relative terms. The PRIO Battle Deaths Dataset gave a similar figure for North Korean military deaths of 316,579. Chinese sources reported similar figures for the North Korean military of 290,000 "casualties" and 90,000 captured. The financial cost for North Korea was massive indirect losses and lost economic activity; the country was devastated by the cost of the war and the American bombing campaign, which, among other things, destroyed 85% of North Korea's buildings and 95% of its power generation. The Soviet Union suffered 299 dead, with 335 planes lost.

The Americans claimed during the war that they had killed over 1,500,000 Chinese and North Korean soldiers. Historian Max Hastings states that this figure is likely exaggerated, with a more realistic number being around 500,000 dead Chinese soldiers. Historian Hans van de Ven writes that reasonable estimates for Chinese and North Korean military casualties are roughly half a million casualties for each of their respective armies, or one million total.

The American Department of Defense estimated the PVA suffered about 400,000 killed and 486,000 wounded, while the KPA suffered 215,000 killed, 303,000 wounded, and over 101,000 captured or missing. Cumings claims a much higher figure of 900,000 dead Chinese soldiers.

Overall, 73% of Chinese infantry troops served in Korea (25 of 34 armies, or 79 of 109 infantry divisions, were rotated in). More than 52% of the Chinese air force, 55% of the tank units, 67% of the artillery divisions, and 100% of the railroad engineering divisions were sent to Korea as well. China spent over 10 billion yuan on the war (roughly US$3.3 billion), not counting USSR aid. This included US$1.3 billion in money owed to the Soviet Union by the end of it. This was a relatively large cost, as China had only 4% of the national income of the United States. Spending on the war constituted 34–43% of China's annual government budget from 1950 to 1953, depending on the year. Despite its underdeveloped economy, Chinese military spending was the world's fourth largest globally for the war's duration after that of the US, the Soviet Union, and the UK.

== Violations of the laws of war ==
There were numerous atrocities and massacres of civilians throughout the war committed by all sides, starting in its first days, though the overwhelming majority of such atrocities have been attributed to acts by the South and the US.

=== War crimes ===
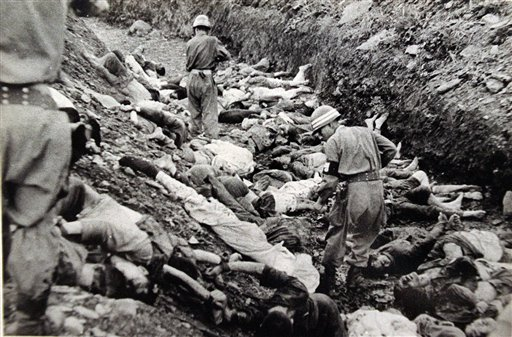
South Korean soldiers walk among the bodies of political prisoners executed near Daejon, July 1950

In 2005–2010, a South Korean Truth and Reconciliation Commission investigated atrocities and other human rights violations through much of the 20th century, from the Japanese colonial period through the Korean War and beyond. It excavated some mass graves from the Bodo League massacres and confirmed the general outlines of those political executions. Of the Korean War-era massacres the commission was petitioned to investigate, 82% were perpetrated by South Korean forces, with 18% perpetrated by North Korean forces. The Bodo League massacres were the mass killings of alleged communists by South Korean forces in the summer of 1950 following North Korea's invasion. The commission was able to verify 4,934 execution victims in these massacres but historians estimate that at least 60,000 people were killed with estimates reaching 200,000. The most well known North Korean massacre was the Seoul National University Hospital massacre on 28 June 1950 where over 1,000 patients and wounded soldiers were killed by North Korean soldiers.

North Korean soldiers and officials systematically murdered South Korean civilians throughout the war, as well as conducting a campaign of mass kidnapping and illegal impressment of civilians in occupied territory. The massacres committed by North Korea were sometimes carried out through public executions using "people's trials" and other times through sporadic bursts of violence by occupying soldiers. The number of victims is estimated in the hundreds of thousands. The Truth and Reconciliation Commission established a minimum of 129,000 South Korean civilians killed by the KPA. Additionally, of the 70,000 South Korean prisoners of war held by the North Koreans, only 8,000 were ever returned. R. J. Rummel estimated that North Korean democide killed 363,000 South Koreans during the war.

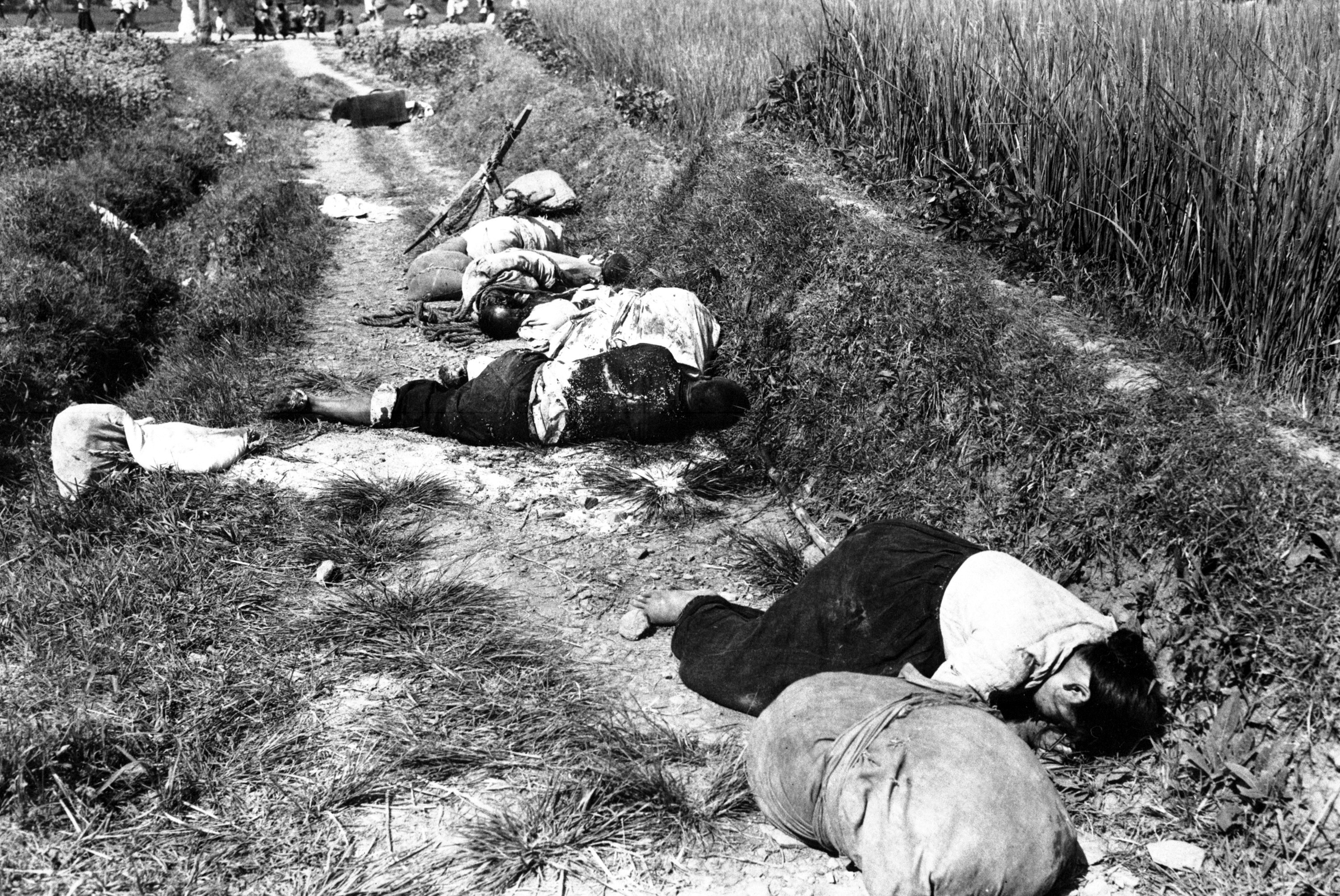
Civilians killed during a night battle near Yongsan, August 1950

The commission also received petitions alleging more than 200 large-scale killings of South Korean civilians by the US military during the war, mostly air attacks. It confirmed several such cases, including refugees crowded into a cave attacked with napalm bombs, which survivors said killed 360 people, and an air attack that killed 197 refugees gathered in a field in the far south. It recommended South Korea seek reparations from the United States, but in 2010, a reorganized commission under a new, conservative government concluded that most US mass killings resulted from "military necessity", while in a small number of cases, they concluded, the US military had acted with "low levels of unlawfulness", but the commission recommended against seeking reparations.

The UN bombing of North Korea during the Korean War has been condemned as a war crime by various authors. A Soviet report estimated that 282,000 North Korean civilians were killed in the bombing. Historian Bruce Cumings has stated: "What hardly any Americans know or remember is that we carpet-bombed the North for three years with next to no concern for civilian casualties." Scholar Sahr Conway-Lanz has stated that, "During the war, American military and civilian officials stretched the term 'military target' to include virtually all human-made structures, capitalizing on the vague distinction between the military and civilian segments of an enemy society. They came to apply the logic of total war to the destruction of the civil infrastructure in North Korea." Cumings wrote "The United Nations Genocide Convention defined the term as acts committed 'with intent to destroy, in whole or in part, a national, ethnically, racial or religious group'. This would include deliberately inflicting on the group conditions of life calculated to bring about its physical destruction in whole or in part. It was approved in 1948 and entered into force in 1951—just as the USAF was inflicting genocide, under this definition and under the aegis of the United Nations Command, on the citizens of North Korea." Cumings has been accused of engaging in apologia for North Korea, exaggerating American crimes, denying North Korean responsibility for starting the war, and whitewashing the conditions of the country's kwanliso concentration camps.

In October 1950, 25 unnamed North Korean prisoners of war were chosen by the U.S. Government as the first test subjects in a planned series of interrogation and brainwashing experiments which eventually became known as Project Artichoke. Korean POWs were subjected to hypnosis experiments involving forced addiction and withdrawals from psychoactive substances, such as LSD. Prisoners were also unwittingly sedated and purposely infected with diseases such as dengue fever, to determine if said diseases could be employed as Incapacitating agents.

==== No Gun Ri massacre ====
Almost a half century after the Korean War, on 29 September 1999, a team of Associated Press journalists reported that a dozen ex-American GI soldiers had confirmed that US forces killed large numbers of civilian refugees – up to 400, mostly women, children and elderly people – in July 1950 under and around a railroad trestle in the hamlet of No Gun Ri. The AP "also published declassified military documents showing that US military commanders had issued standing orders to shoot civilians". The highest levels of the South Korean and US governments ordered and conducted lengthy investigations on the matter. "The Pentagon's No Gun Ri review spent a year examining over a million documents and the interview statements from approximately 275 American and Korean witnesses and issued its findings in early 2001." In its final report, after years of dismissing the story of Korean villagers, the US Army affirmed the AP's finding that American troops had killed the refugees.

== Environmental impact ==
The Korean War also resulted in severe damage to the environment and ecosystem. During the war, widespread devastation resulted from direct combat, industrial chaos, and the considerable use of chemical agents, such as defoliants. In addition to conventional weapons, chemical agents were often used, killing much flora and fauna, contaminating soil, and destroying forests. Near the end of the war, the U.S Air force bombed five out of the 20 hydroelectric and irrigation dams in North Korea in Toksan, Chasan, Kuwonga, Kusong, and Toksang. These attacks harmed access to infrastructure and washed away important topsoil needed to grow crops like rice. The attacks occurred during the rice growing season, which lasts from May to August, making the effects of the attacks more severe for the local population.

== Aftermath ==
=== North Korea ===
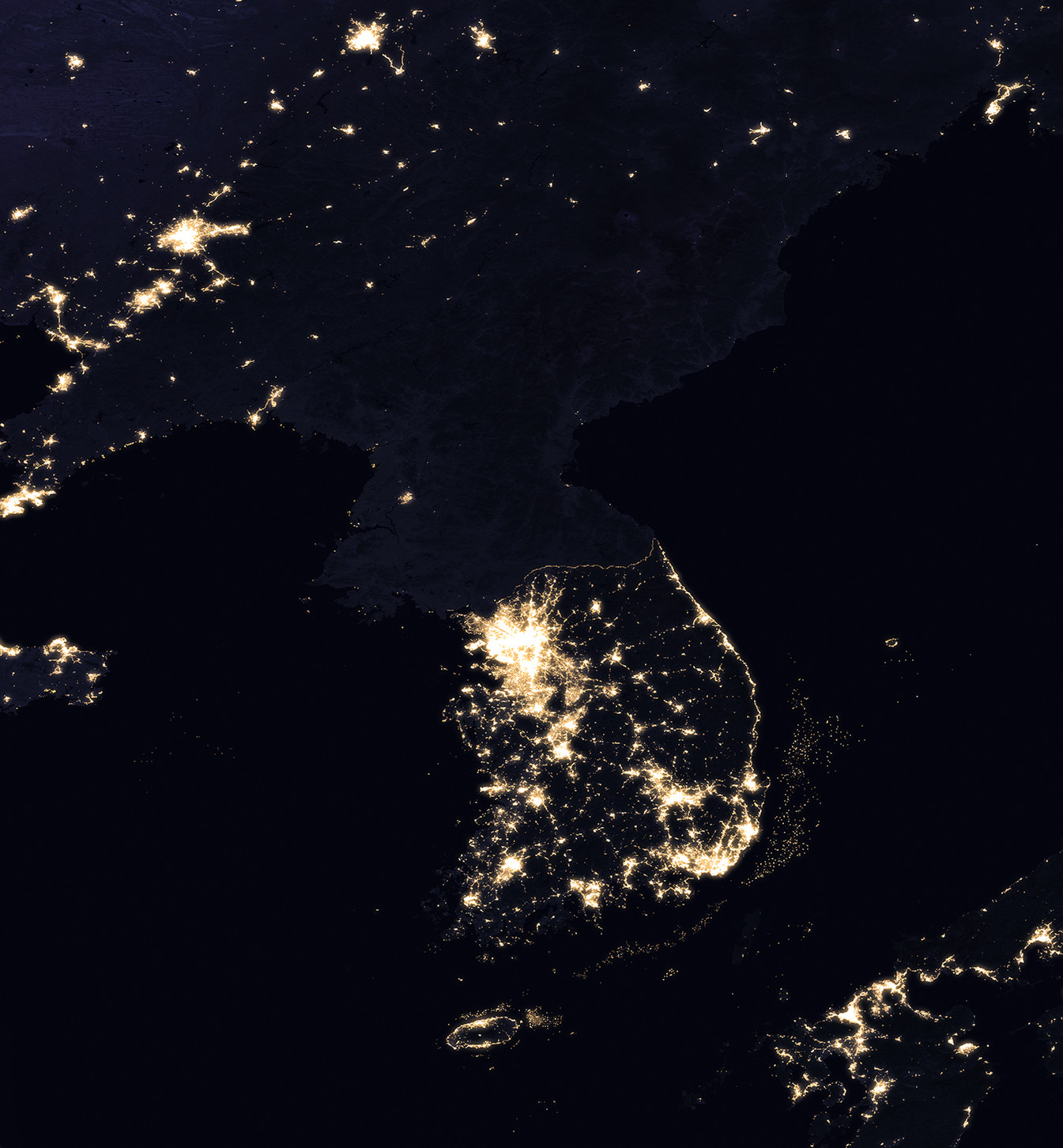
The Korean Peninsula at night, shown in a 2017 composite photograph from NASA

UN bombardment had "destroyed or forced underground virtually all of the north's heavy industry." "By the end of the war, North Korea's industrial infrastructure had been knocked out. Electricity generation was only 17.2 percent of its 1949 output; coal was 17.7 percent; steel was 2.8 percent; and cement was 5 percent."

After the armistice, Kim Il Sung requested Soviet economic and industrial assistance. In September 1953, the Soviet government agreed to "cancel or postpone repayment for all ... outstanding debts," and promised to grant North Korea one billion rubles in monetary aid, industrial equipment and consumer goods. Eastern European members of the Soviet Bloc also contributed with "logistical support, technical aid, [and] medical supplies." China canceled North Korea's war debts, provided 800 million yuan, promised trade cooperation and sent in thousands of troops to rebuild damaged infrastructure. Contemporary North Korea remains underdeveloped, and continues to be a totalitarian dictatorship since the end of the war, with an elaborate cult of personality around the Kim dynasty.

Present-day North Korea follows Songun, or "military-first" policy and has the highest number of military and paramilitary personnel in the world, with 7,769,000 active, reserve, and paramilitary personnel, or approximately 30% of its population. Its active-duty army of 1.28 million is the fourth largest in the world, after China, the US, and India; consisting of 4.9% of its population. North Korea possesses nuclear weapons. A 2014 UN inquiry into abuses of human rights in North Korea concluded that, "the gravity, scale and nature of these violations reveal a state that does not have any parallel in the contemporary world," with Amnesty International and Human Rights Watch holding similar views.

=== South Korea ===
South Korea gained a net total of 4,000 square kilometers and some 360,000 citizens from the truce settlement. During the war 650,000 Koreans permanently fled from North to South while 290,000 fled (or were abducted) from South to North. These 650,000 joined another 740,000 Koreans who had migrated North to South between 1945 and the start of the war.

By August 1952, the Republic of Korea's Office of Public Information reported that "$954,659,023 in civilian property damage, including the complete destruction of over 400,000 civilian houses and 8,700 primary schools, had occurred in the war."

"The US Eighth Army, which arrived in South Korea in 1950, has never left." As of 2018, "almost 30,000 American service personnel remain stationed across South Korea," and are there are more than 80 American military installations in South Korea maintained by the US military.

Postwar recovery was different in the two Koreas. South Korea, which started from a far lower industrial base than North Korea (the latter contained 80% of Korea's heavy industry in 1945), stagnated in the first postwar decade. In 1953, South Korea, and the United States signed a Mutual Defense Treaty. South Korean anti-Americanism after the war was fueled by the presence and behavior of US Forces Korea military personnel and US support for Park's authoritarian regime, a fact still evident during the country's democratic transition in the 1980s. However, anti-Americanism has significantly declined in South Korea, from 46% favorable in 2003 to 74% favorable in 2011, making South Korea one of the most pro-US countries.

A large number of mixed-race "GI babies" (offspring of US and other UN soldiers and Korean women) were filling up the country's orphanages. Because Korean traditional society places significant weight on paternal family ties, bloodlines, and purity of race, children of mixed race or those without fathers are not easily accepted in South Korean society. International adoption of Korean children began in 1954. The Immigration Act of 1952 legalized the naturalization of non-Blacks and non-Whites as US citizens and made possible the entry of military spouses and children from South Korea. With the passage of the Immigration and Nationality Act of 1965, which substantially changed US immigration policy toward non-Europeans, Koreans became one of the fastest-growing Asian groups in the United States.

=== United States ===
The United States spent US$30 billion on the war. "By 1951 the United States was spending $650 billion on defense in current dollars."

One of the legacies of the Korean War is the new and unprecedented American military-industrial complex that arose in the 1950s. Regarding this legacy, historian Bruce Cumings has stated that: The Korean War was the crisis that, in Acheson's words, "came along and saved us;" by that he meant that it enabled the final approval of NSC 68 and passage through Congress of a quadrupling of American defense spending. More than that, it was this war and not World War II that occasioned the enormous foreign military base structure and the domestic military-industrial complex to service it and which has come to define the sinews of American global power ever since.

"The war gave oxygen to the Truman doctrine; removed the postwar cap on military spending; restored and enlarged the American military apparatus after nearly five years of demobilisation; [and] unlocked the riches of NSC-68." "The decision to intervene in Korea did not merely halt and reverse the process of demobilisation, it had a longer term effect." Since 1950, the trajectory of increasing defence spending by the United States, has "continued almost unabated, spiraling upward, despite brief periodic reductions that have done nothing to alter the long-term trend."

According to scholar Louis Fisher, "President Harry Truman's commitment of US troops to Korea in June 1950 is the single most important precedent for the executive use of military force without congressional authority."

=== China ===
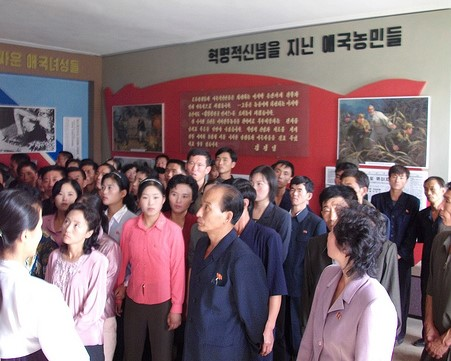
North Koreans touring the Museum of American War Atrocities in 2009

Mao Zedong's decision to take on the US was a direct attempt to confront what the communist bloc viewed as the strongest anti-communist power in the world, undertaken at a time when the Chinese communist regime was still consolidating its own power. Mao supported intervention not to save North Korea, but because he believed that a military conflict with the US was inevitable after the US entered the war, and to appease the Soviet Union to secure military dispensation and achieve Mao's goal of making China a major world military power. Mao was equally ambitious in improving his own prestige inside the communist international community. In his later years, Mao believed that Stalin only gained a positive opinion of him after China's entrance into the Korean War. Inside mainland China, the war improved the long-term prestige of Mao, Zhou, and Peng, allowing the Chinese Communist Party to increase its legitimacy while weakening anti-communist dissent.

In Chinese media, the Chinese war effort is considered as an example of China engaging the strongest power in the world with an underequipped army, forcing it to retreat, and fighting it to a military stalemate. These successes were contrasted with China's historical humiliations by Japan and by Western powers over the previous hundred years, highlighting the abilities of the PLA and the Chinese Communist Party.

The Korean War cemented China's relationship with the USSR for some time, making it more dependent on the Soviet Union for development aid and technology, while limiting cooperation between China and the US. A high proportion of government expenditures were needed for the war and this slowed China's reconstruction. The most significant negative long-term consequence of the war for China was that it led the United States to guarantee the safety of Chiang Kai-shek's regime in Taiwan, effectively ensuring that Taiwan would remain outside of PRC control through the present day. Anti-US sentiments, which were already a significant factor during the Chinese Civil War, were ingrained into Chinese culture during the communist propaganda campaigns of the Korean War.

=== Others ===
The Korean War affected other participant combatants. Turkey, for example, entered NATO in 1952, and the foundation was laid for bilateral diplomatic and trade relations with South Korea. The war also played a role in the refugee crisis in Turkey in 1950–1951.

== See also ==
- Korean War in popular culture
- Korean–American Volunteer Group
- Bibliography of the Korean War
- List of Korean War Medal of Honor recipients
- List of Korean War weapons
- List of military equipment used in the Korean War
- Partisans in the Korean War
- Transfer of People's Volunteer Army soldiers' remains from South Korea to China
- UN Command Military Armistice Commission operating from 1953 to the present
- UN Commission for the Unification and Rehabilitation of Korea
- UN Temporary Commission on Korea
- United Service Organizations
- United Nations Command
- United Nations Security Council
- Use of force in international law

=== War memorials ===
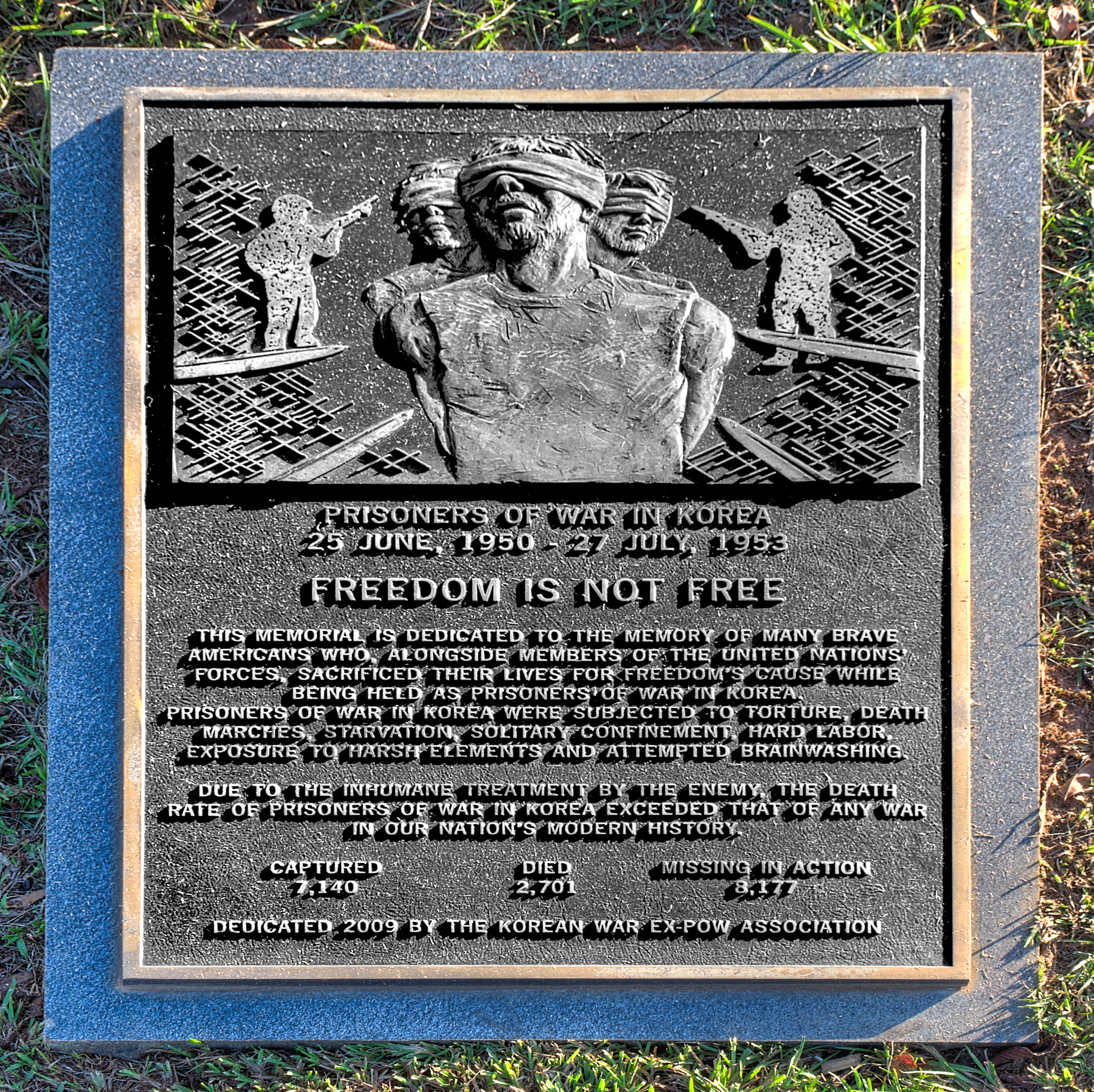
Memorial at Andersonville National Historic Site

- Korean War Memorial Wall,^{map} Brampton, Ontario
- Korean War Veterans Memorial, Washington, D.C.
- Memorial of the War to Resist US Aggression and Aid Korea, Dandong, China
- National War Memorial (New Zealand)
- Philadelphia Korean War Memorial
- United Nations Memorial Cemetery, Busan
- Memorial of Turks Who Fought in Korea, Ankara, Turkey (in Turkish)
- Victorious War Museum, Pyongyang, North Korea
- War Memorial of Korea, Yongsan-dong, Yongsan District, Seoul, South Korea
