= General Stone =

General Stone may refer to:

- Charles B. Stone III (1904–1992), U.S. Air Force lieutenant general
- Charles P. Stone (1915–2012), U.S. Army major general
- Charles Pomeroy Stone (1824–1887), Union Army brigadier general
- Douglas M. Stone (fl. 1970s–2010s), U.S. Marine Corps major general
- Howard F. Stone (born 1931), U.S. Army lieutenant general
- Robert Stone (British Army officer) (1890–1974), British Army lieutenant general
- Roy Stone (general) (1836–1905), Union Army brigadier general
- William S. Stone (1910–1968), U.S. Air Force major general

== See also ==
- Attorney General Stone (disambiguation)
