= George H. Weems =

U.S. Army Brigadier General

George Hatton Weems
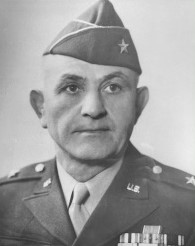
- BG George H. Weems
- Born: September 27, 1891; Southside, Tennessee, US
- Died: February 25, 1957 (aged 65); Fort Campbell, Tennessee, US
- Burial place: Arlington National Cemetery
- Military career
- Allegiance: United States
- Branch: United States Army
- Service years: 1917–1951
- Rank: Brigadier General
- Service number: 0-5297
- Unit: Infantry Branch
- Commands: 22nd Infantry Regiment
- Conflicts: World War I: Battle of Belleau Wood; Battle of Château-Thierry; World War II
- Awards: Distinguished Service Cross; Distinguished Service Medal; Silver Star; Legion of Merit

George Hatton Weems (September 27, 1891 – February 25, 1957) was a highly decorated officer in the United States Army with the rank of Brigadier General. A graduate of the United States Military Academy, he was decorated with Distinguished Service Cross, the second highest decoration of the United States Military for bravery, during the World War I.

Following the War, he remained in the Army and rose to the general's rank during World War II. Weems served as Assistant Commandant of the Army Infantry School at Fort Benning in Georgia for the duration of the World War II and after the surrender of Nazi Germany, he was a U.S. Military Representative on Allied Control Commission for Hungary.

== Early career ==
Weems was born on September 27, 1891, in Southside, Tennessee, to Joseph and Bessie Rye Weems and had seven siblings. His father died in 1896 and mother in 1903, so George went to live to Waverly, Tennessee, to his older sister Violetta. Following a graduation from the Waverly High School, Weems studied at the Southwestern Presbyterian University in Clarksville, Tennessee, before received an appointment to the United States Military Academy at West Point, New York, in May 1913. During his time at the Academy, he was active in football and wrestling squads and reached the rank of Cadet Captain.

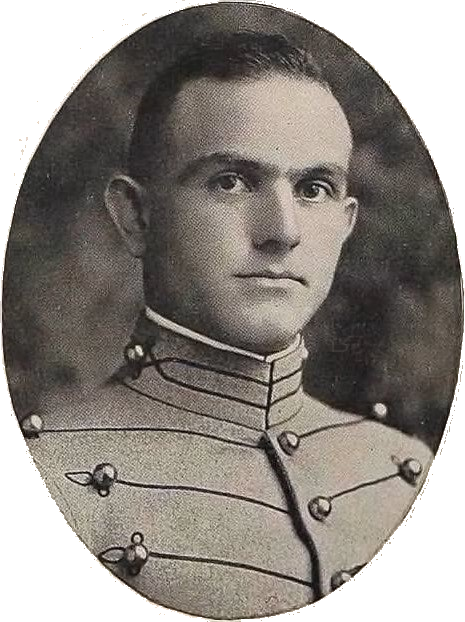
At West Point in 1917

Weems graduated, 94th in a class of 139, on April 20, 1917, with Bachelor of Science degree, shortly following the United States entry into World War I, and was commissioned second lieutenant in the Infantry Branch. He was ordered to the Army Camp at Syracuse, New York, where he completed his basic training with 9th Infantry Regiment and was promoted to First lieutenant in May that year. The 9th Infantry embarked for France as the part of 2nd Infantry Division in September 1917 and Weems was meanwhile promoted to the temporary rank of captain on August 5.

He arrived in France by the end of September 1917 and following a month of intensive training, Weems assumed command of regimental Machine gun company. Weems went to the trench sector near Verdun in mid-March 1918 and remained there until the beginning of May that year. He subsequently led his company during the Château-Thierry operation and distinguished himself during the capture of Vaux on July 1–2, 1918.

Weems personally took charge of his advanced positions and manned captured enemy machine guns on an exposed flank of the battalion. By his coolness and daring in fearlessly exposing himself to the enemy fire in order that he might personally direct the fire of his guns, he succeeded in breaking down the counterattack of the enemy upon the exposed flank of his battalion. For his leadership and gallantry in action, he was decorated with the Distinguished Service Cross, the second highest decoration of the United States Military for bravery. He also received Silver Star for bravery in the later phase of the battle.

In mid-July 1918, Weems was ordered to the Army Officer Candidates School at Langres, where he served as an instructor until the end of November that year. He was promoted to the temporary rank of major on May 5, 1918. The Allies of the United States bestowed him with French Croix de guerre 1914–1918 with Gilt Star and Order of the Crown of Italy and Italian War Merit Cross.

== Interwar period ==
Weems rejoined 9th Infantry Regiment in December 1918 and took part in the Allied occupation of the Rhineland until the end of July 1919. He returned to the United States, was reverted to the peacetime rank of Captain and assumed duty as Commander of the 4th Machine Gun Battalion at Camp Travis in Texas. He was ordered to the Army Infantry School at Fort Benning in August 1920 and served as an instructor in Machine Guns until May 1922, when he entered the Company Officers Class Course at the Infantry School.

He graduated one year later and assumed duty as Professor of Military Science & Tactics at Davidson College in North Carolina. In June 1927 Weems reported to the Command and General Staff School at Fort Leavenworth as a student officer and following the graduation in June 1928, he returned to the Military Academy at West Point as an Assistant Instructor in the Department of Tactics.

Weems served there until June 1929, when he was transferred to the Air Corps Tactical School at Langley Field, Virginia, for duty as an instructor in Infantry Tactics. When the school moved to Maxwell Field at Montgomery, Alabama, in 1931, Weems went with the school and continued as an instructor there until June 1933. During his time at the Air Corps Tactical School, he was promoted to major on December 1, 1932, and organized the G.H. Weems Educational Fund to aid deserving students who are unable to finance their college education.

He subsequently entered the Army War College in Washington, D.C., and following the graduation in July 1934, he entered the two-month course at Chemical Warfare School at Edgewood Arsenal, Maryland. Weems then served as the Executive Officer of the 22nd Infantry Regiment at Fort McClellan, Alabama, and also Executive Officer of Fort McClellan until September 1935, when he was transferred to Fort Sam Houston, Texas, for duty as Assistant Chief of Staff for Operations (G-3) of 2nd Infantry Division.

In May 1939, Weems was ordered to the Caribbean and assumed duty as Chief of U.S. Military Mission to Haiti with the headquarters in Port-au-Prince. On July 1, 1940, he was promoted to the rank of lieutenant colonel and to colonel on January 15, 1941. He departed Haiti in November that year and received National Order of Honour and Merit in recognition of his merits during organization of Haitian Military Academy. Weems also cooperated with Bolivia and Brazil and was also decorated by those countries.

== World War II ==
Weems returned to the United States shortly before the Japanese Attack on Pearl Harbor and assumed command of 22nd Infantry Regiment now at Fort Benning, Georgia. Upon the United States entry into World War II, he was transferred to the staff of Army Infantry School at Fort Benning in February 1942 and assumed duty as Assistant Commandant of the School under Major general Leven C. Allen.

For his new billet, Weems was promoted to the temporary rank of Brigadier general on September 10, 1942, and was instrumental in training more than 60,000 young Second Lieutenants of Infantry, as well as thousands of officers and enlisted personnel, earning the nickname "Daddy of the Doughboys." He also went overseas, when he was sent to the special observation mission to the European Theater of Operations from November 1944 to January 1945 and to the Philippines from August to November 1945. Weems was present in Manila on V-J Day. For his service at the Army Infantry School, he was decorated with Legion of Merit.

== Postwar service ==
Weems was sent to Hungary in August 1946 and succeeded Major general William S. Key as U.S. Military representative on the Military Control Commission, which was established to control the defeated Axis country. He remained in that commission until April 1947, when he was reverted to the peacetime rank of Colonel and appointed Provost Marshal, U.S. European Command in Germany. For his service on the Military Control Commission in Hungary, Weems was decorated with Army Distinguished Service Medal.

In July 1949, Weems returned to the United States and was appointed Chief of the Georgia Military District. He retired from active duty on September 30, 1951, after 34 years of commissioned service.

== Death ==
Following his retirement from the Army, Weems returned to his residence in Waverly, Tennessee, and was active in Methodist Church. Brigadier general George H. Weems died on February 25, 1957, at U.S. Army Hospital at Fort Campbell following ten days of hospitalization. He was buried with full military honors at Arlington National Cemetery. In April 1970, Weems Pound at Fort Benning, a part of the Army's Rangers training, was named in his honor.

== Decorations ==
Brigadier general Weems's ribbon bar:

| 1st Row | Distinguished Service Cross | | Army Distinguished Service Medal | Silver Star |
| 2nd Row | Legion of Merit | World War I Victory Medal with three battle clasps | Army of Occupation of Germany Medal | American Defense Service Medal |
| 3rd Row | American Campaign Medal | European-African-Middle Eastern Campaign Medal | Asiatic–Pacific Campaign Medal | World War II Victory Medal |
| 4th Row | Army of Occupation Medal | National Defense Service Medal | French Croix de guerre 1914–1918 with Gilt Star | Order of the Crown of Italy, rank Knight |
| 5th Row | Italian War Merit Cross | Haitian National Order of Honour and Merit, rank Officer | Brazilian Order of Military Merit, rank Officer | Bolivian Order of the Condor of the Andes, rank Officer |
