= 33rd Special Operations Squadron =

- Active: 12 June 1917 – present
- Country: United States
- Branch: United States Air Force
- Part of: Air Force Special Operations Command
- Garrison/HQ: Cannon Air Force Base, New Mexico
- Engagements: World War I World War II 1991 Gulf War Operation Enduring Freedom Iraq War
- Decorations: Air Force Meritorious Unit Award; Air Force Outstanding Unit Award

Insignia
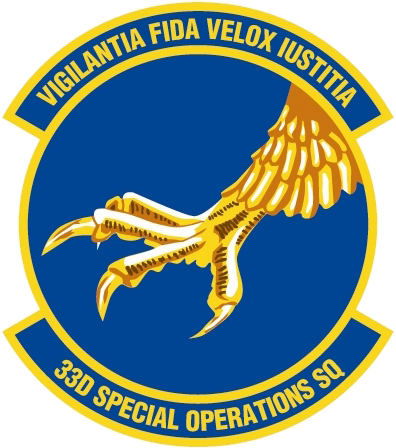
- 33rd Special Operations Squadron emblem (approved 13 July 2010)

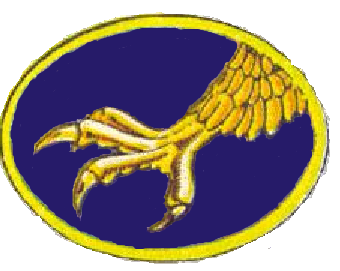
- 33rd Pursuit Squadron emblem (approved 22 September 1933)

The 33rd Special Operations Squadron is a United States Air Force unit, assigned to the 27th Special Operations Group at Cannon Air Force Base, New Mexico. The squadron operates the General Atomics MQ-9 Reaper.

The unit is one of the oldest squadrons in the Air Force, its origins dating to 12 June 1917. Over this time, members of the squadron took part in World War I, World War II, the 1991 Gulf War, Operation Enduring Freedom and Operation Iraqi Freedom.

The 33rd SOS was named Air Force Special Operations Command's Special Operations Squadron of the Year for 2012. The squadron was reactivated by the Air Force in May 2009, in view of a perceived need for greater special operations air capacity.

== First World War ==
The 33rd Special Operations Squadron traces its history to the organization of the 33rd Aero Squadron at Camp Kelly, Texas, on 17 May 1917, about a month after the United States' entry into World War I. The squadron consisted of 160 recruits and was first called "2nd Company "G", Kelly Field". Later, the name was changed to "1st Company "F", Kelly Field". On 23 June 1917 the 33rd Aero Squadron was organized from these recruits. After rudimentary indoctrination into the Army at Kelly Field, the squadron was given orders for overseas duty in France, and proceeded to Fort Totten, New York on 15 August.

=== Across the Atlantic ===
On 22 August they were transported to the Port of Entry, Hoboken, New Jersey, and were boarded on the RMS Baltic (1903). The next day, they left Pier 59, en route to Halifax, Nova Scotia where the ship anchored awaiting for a convoy. Finally, on 5 September, the convoy was formed and the trans-Atlantic journey began.

On the night of 14 September, two red rockets were fired from an accompanying destroyer that had spotted a submarine periscope. The destroyer dropped depth charges on the submarine, and the Baltic made a sudden turn to port, that caused both men and anything loose aboard the ship to move. Suddenly a large explosion was heard and five long blasts were made by the ship's whistle and everyone on board was ordered to report to their assigned lifeboats. The Baltic's captain announced that a torpedo had struck the ship, but it had only made a glancing blow on the bow; that the emergency pumps were working and there was no danger.

=== Third Aviation Instruction Center ===
The next morning the ship arrived at Liverpool, England; the squadrons on the Baltic being the first American airmen to land there. The 33rd was boarded on a train and proceeded to Southampton where it was stationed at a rest camp, arriving at 1:00 am on 16 September. At Southampton, fifty men of the squadron were detached to the Royal Flying Corps for three months training as aircraft mechanics. The remainder of the squadron were to proceed to France. The squadron arrived at Le Havre, then continued by train to Etampes, France, arriving on the 19th. At Etampes, the squadron was divided into three detachments for training at different aircraft schools in France, and were designated as the 33rd Aero Squadron Detachments. The detachments were sent to Paris, Clermont-Ferrand and Lyon. In addition, 18 men were sent to Issoudun Aerodrome to help construct the Third Aviation Instruction Center.

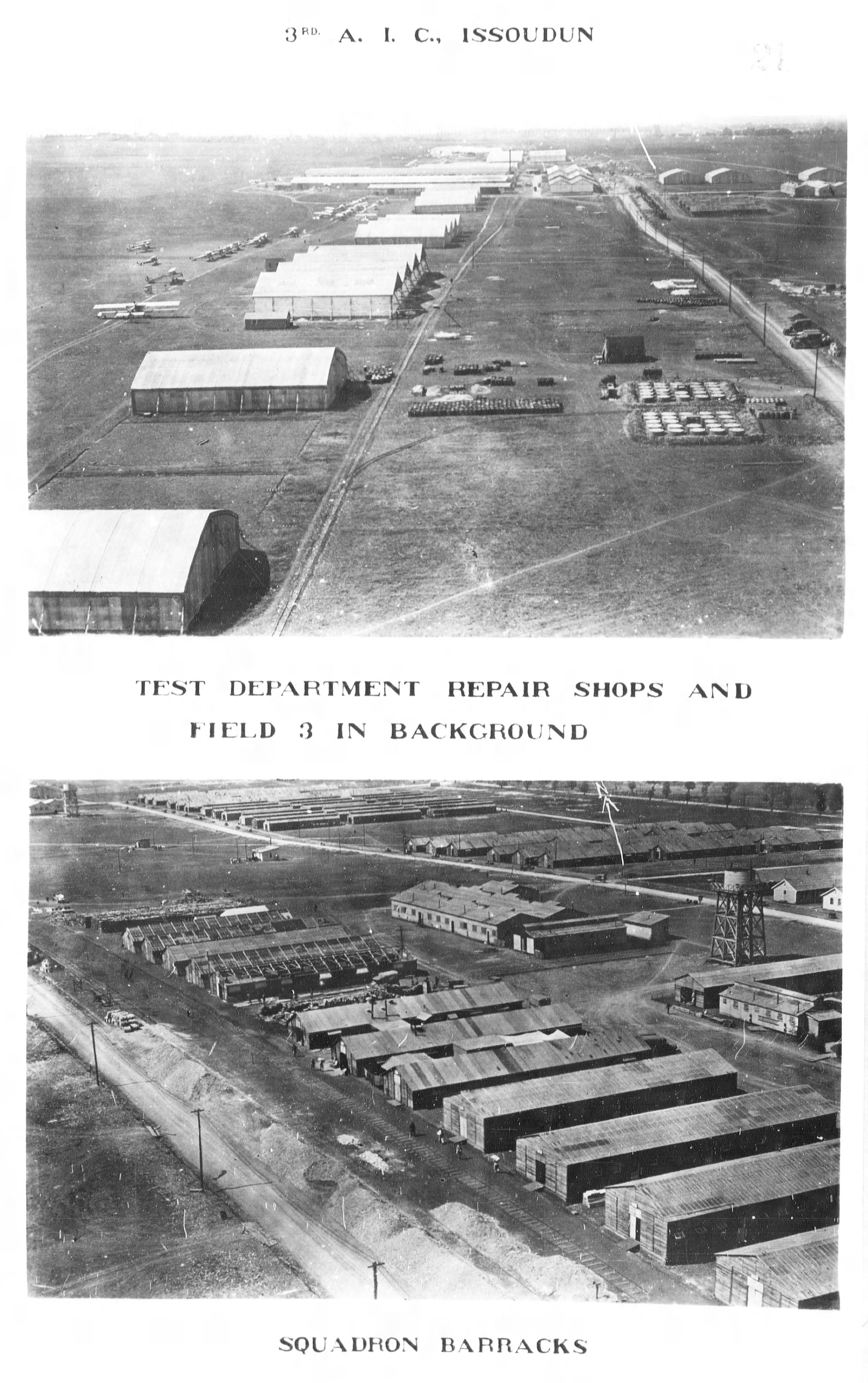
Third Aviation Instruction Center, Issodun Aerodrome, Summer 1918

The squadron was recombined at Issodun Aerodrome just after Christmas Day, 1917. The men had been thoroughly trained in aircraft assembly, engine maintenance and the other skills needed for them to do their work at the Third Aviation Instruction Center. The men from England arrived on 14 January, and they had become instructors in pistol, rifle, and machine-gunnery. The duties of the squadron became the maintenance of the training aircraft, primarily French Nieuports at the school, which had been set up by the Training Section, AEF to train American pursuit pilots prior to them being sent into combat at the Front. In their off-hours, the men engaged in sports such as boxing and football. Athletics was an important part of the duty at Issodun, giving the squadron, which was widely divided around the station, an esprit-de-corps and helped build morale. In addition to the aircraft work, squadron members were also engaged in expanding the 3rd AIC as necessary, erecting additional buildings and aircraft hangars as new airfields were required as training was expanded with additional pilots and aircraft.

The numbers of aircraft accidents increased in relation to the increase of pilots going through training. Some of these accidents were found to be caused by a long row of large trees to the north of one of the fields. Those were cut down to give the students additional unobstructed space for landings and takeoffs. Overlapping airfields were also causing a problem with the increased number of aircraft, and additional airfields, away from the main base, were acquired and set up to relieve that problem. Severe storms, especially in the summer caused hangars to be torn up and airplanes to be damaged by high winds or flying debris. The work of the mechanics, in particular, could be quite dangerous as men were severely injured by propeller blades, and in one case, a squadron member working on the field was killed when another plane, attempting a takeoff, instead swerved and ran into the plane he was working on.

During the month of September 1918, training was especially intense as new pilots, to be assigned to the new Second Army Air Service, began to arrive for instruction. By the time of the Armistice on 11 November, the men of the squadron held responsible positions in many of the support areas of the Third Aviation Instruction Center. Although they did not enter combat, the men provided the means to train the pilots who went to the front and gave them the best of training so they might accomplish their work.

=== Demobilization ===
The 33rd remained at Issodun until the end of December 1918 when orders were received to proceed to the 1st Air Depot, Colombey-les-Belles Airdrome, France, for demobilization. From Colombey, the squadron was moved to a staging camp under the Services of Supply at Bordeaux, France, in January waiting for a date to report to a base port for transportation home. In mid-March, the squadron boarded a troop ship, arriving in New York on 5 April. From there, the 33rd moved to Mitchel Field, New York where the men were demobilized and returned to civilian life. The 33rd Aero Squadron was demobilized on 14 April 1919 at Mitchel Field, New York.

== Inter-war years ==
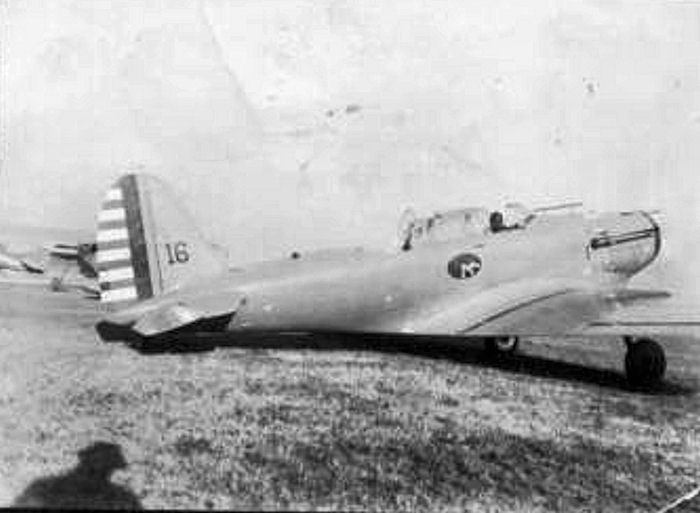
33rd Pursuit Squadron Consolidated P-30, Langley Field, Virginia, 1937

The 33rd Pursuit Squadron was reconstituted as a regular Army Air Service unit on 24 March 1923, but remained inactive. By 1929, the squadron was partially organized at Kelly Field as a Regular Army Inactive unit (Note: Regular Army Inactive units were units that were constituted in the regular army. Although they were not activated, they were organized with reserve personnel during the 1920s and early 1930s. Even though they had reserve personnel assigned, they were not Organized Reserve units. Because they had no regular personnel they were still considered inactive in the regular army. Clay, p. vi) with reserve personnel and its members trained as individual reservists at Kelly Field.

On 25 June 1932 its reservists were transferred and it was activated at Langley Field, Virginia. It was equipped with Boeing P-12s, and in 1933 some Curtiss P-6 Hawk pursuit planes and trained primarily on coastal defense patrols. Assigned to the 8th Pursuit Group, the squadron continued to fly pursuit planes, receiving new front-line aircraft for testing and evaluation. These included the Consolidated P-30, Curtiss P-36 Hawk, Curtiss YP-37 and Northrop A-17 Dive Bomber.

The squadron was redesignated as the 33rd Pursuit Squadron (Fighter) on 6 December 1939; It moved to Mitchel Field, New York in March 1940 after the breakout of World War II in Europe. It was redesignated as an interceptor squadron, and shortly afterwards received early-model Curtiss P-40C Warhawks. Its mission was the air defense of the New York City area.

== Second World War ==
The squadron was deployed to Iceland with P-40 Warhawk fighters as part of the Iceland Base Command (IBC) as part of a bilateral agreement with the Icelandic Government to provide air defense of their nation. The squadron departed from New York Harbor on 27 July 1941 on the USS Wasp (CV-7)}, arriving off Iceland on 6 August 1941. The squadron flew its P-40s off the carrier, and landed at Kaldadarnes Airfield, near Reykjavík where it replaced a Royal Air Force squadron which withdrew to the United Kingdom. It operated from Kaldadarnes until Patterson Field was completed in July 1942.

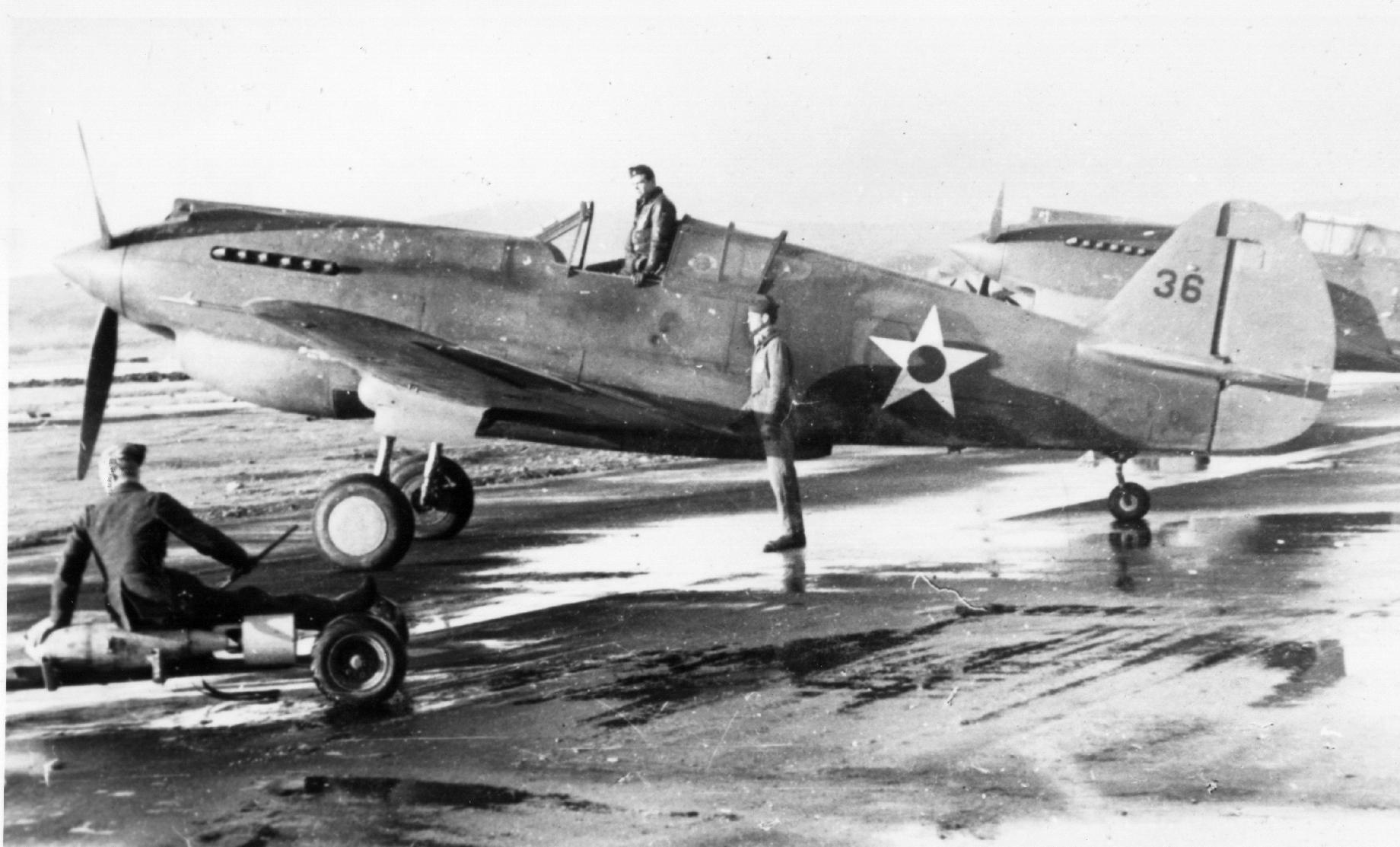
33rd Pursuit Squadron P-40C Warhawk, Kaldadarnes Airfield, Iceland, 1941.

Additional fighter squadrons were sent to Iceland after the United States entry into World War II, and the 33rd was reassigned to the new 342nd Composite Group in September 1942, and the squadron received additional Bell P-39 Airacobras. Along with the air defense mission, the 33rd also provided escort patrols for Air Transport Command operations flying through Iceland as part of the North Atlantic air ferry route, and antisubmarine patrols.

With the completion of Meeks Field in March 1943, headquarters of the 342nd was moved there, however, due to congestion with Air Transport Command ferrying traffic, the 33rd operated primarily from Patterson Field. German aircraft, operating from bases in Occupied Norway, were first engaged near Iceland on 28 April 1942 and had been followed by a three months' lull. Then in late July three more encounters took place. Encounters between German aircraft and the 342nd continued until the summer of 1943 when the last enemy aircraft (a Junkers Ju 88) was intercepted on 5 August. After that, with the Germans on the defensive in Europe, the Luftwaffe was engaged in other activities elsewhere.

The 342nd was inactivated in March 1944 and the squadron came under the direct control of the 24th Composite Wing. The P-40s and P-39s were replaced with new Republic P-47D Thunderbolts, however, with the Germans in full retreat after D-Day, the 24th was disestablished and the 33rd remained in Iceland as a defensive measure under IBC until the end of the war when it was inactivated.

== Tactical Air Command ==
In April 1953, the 33rd Fighter-Bomber Squadron was activated as part of the 37th Fighter-Bomber Group, at Clovis Air Force Base, New Mexico under Tactical Air Command (TAC). The 37th FBG was assigned to Clovis to replace the 50th FBG which was deployed to West Germany as part of USAFE. However, the 37th was neither manned or equipped due to personnel and equipment shortages and was inactivated on 25 June 1953.

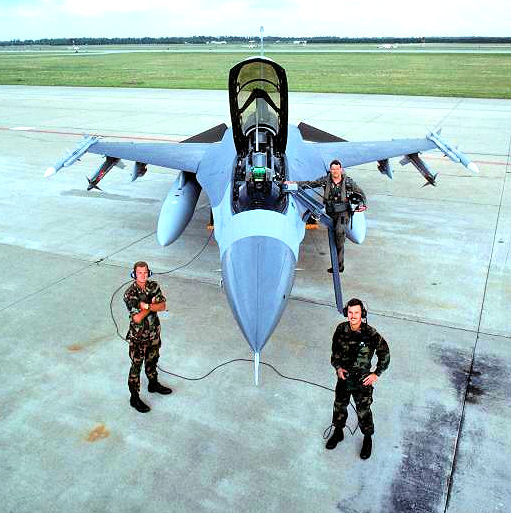
Lt Col Gary L. North, the 33rd FS commander; the crew chief; and assistant crew chief, pose with his F-16 Fighting Falcon (Note: Aircraft is General Dynamics F-16D Block 42H Fighting Falcon, Serial 90-778. Lt Col North flew this plane when he shot down an Iraqi MiG-25 over the No-fly zone on 27 December 1992 during Operation Southern Watch.)

The 33rd was again re-activated at the newly opened Myrtle Beach Air Force Base, South Carolina by TAC as the 33rd Fighter-Day Squadron as part of the 342nd FDG on 25 July 1956. The 342nd was equipped with a mixed assortment of aircraft, the most modern being five RF-80A Shooting Stars. These aircraft were considered to be at Myrtle Beach on an interim status, as North American Aircraft established a training facility at the base for F-100 Super Sabre orientation. Although on paper a fully functioning wing, the efforts and activities of the 342nd FDW were directed to reach operational capabilities by overcoming the problems and obstacles inherent in the activation of a new fighter wing on a base still largely under construction. The 342nd FDW lasted 117 days until 18 November 1956 when the Air Force inactivated the unit and activated the 354th Fighter-Day Wing to replace it, and the men and aircraft of the 33rd Fighter-Day Squadron were transferred to the newly activated 353rd Fighter Day Squadron.

Reactivated a third time by Tactical Air Command on 15 October 1969, at Shaw Air Force Base, South Carolina, this time as the 33rd Tactical Reconnaissance Training Squadron, and assigned to the 363rd Tactical Reconnaissance Wing. The 33rd assumed the personnel and equipment of provisional 4415th Combat Crew Training Squadron, being equipped with McDonnell RF-4C Phantom II reconnaissance aircraft. The mission of the squadron at Shaw was to train newly assigned pilots in the tactical reconnaissance mission. In 1982, as the 363rd converted to a General Dynamics F-16 Fighting Falcon tactical fighter wing, the 33rd was inactivated on 1 October 1982 when its reconnaissance training mission ended.

Reactivated as part of the 363rd Tactical Fighter Wing in 1985 at Shaw as the wing's third F-16 squadron. Trained in tactical fighter missions designed to destroy enemy forces, 1985–1993. Deployed aircrews and aircraft to the Middle East during the 1991 Gulf War; later participated in Operation Southern Watch over southern Iraq, 1992–1993. Lt Col Gary L. North, commander of 33rd Fighter Squadron, became the first American F-16 pilot to score an aerial victory over Iraq on 27 December 1992. The squadron was inactivated in late 1993 when the 20th Fighter Wing assumed the mission and assets of the 363rd Fighter Wing as part of the Air Force downsizing after the end of the Cold War.

== Drone reconnaissance and surveillance ==
From 2009 the mission of the 33rd SOS was to operate the General Atomics MQ-9 Reaper, primarily over combat areas, to provide surveillance and reconnaissance. During 2012, 39 members of the squadron were deployed, accumulating a total of 3,891 days downrange and facilitating thousands of hours of ISR coverage. Ten additional squadron members were deployed to fill roles such as Remotely Piloted Aircraft liaison officers, ISR battle captains, and group commanders. Their deployed contributions totaled 517 days.

== Lineage ==
- Organized as the 33rd Aero Squadron on 12 June 1917

Demobilized on 14 April 1919

- Reconstituted and redesignated 33rd Pursuit Squadron on 24 March 1923

Organized as a Regular Army Inactive unit by June 1929<Clay/>
Activated on 25 June 1932
Redesignated 33rd Pursuit Squadron (Fighter) on 6 December 1939
Redesignated 33rd Pursuit Squadron (Interceptor) on 12 March 1941
Redesignated 33rd Fighter Squadron on 15 May 1942
Redesignated 33rd Fighter Squadron, Single Engine on 3 February 1944
Inactivated on 22 June 1945

- Redesignated 33rd Fighter-Bomber Squadron on 3 March 1953

Activated on 8 April 1953
Inactivated on 25 June 1953

- Redesignated 33rd Fighter-Day Squadron on 7 May 1956

Activated on 25 July 1956
Inactivated on 19 November 1956

- Redesignated 33rd Tactical Reconnaissance Training Squadron on 18 August 1969 and activated (not organized)

Organized on 15 October 1969
Inactivated on 1 October 1982

- Redesignated 33rd Tactical Fighter Squadron on 7 September 1984

Activated on 1 January 1985
Redesignated 33rd Fighter Squadron on 1 November 1991
Inactivated on 15 November 1993

- Redesignated 33rd Special Operations Squadron on 29 April 2009

Activated on 29 May 2009

=== Assignments ===
- Post Headquarters, Kelly Field, 17 May 1917
- Aviation Concentration Center, 15 August 1917
- Air Service Headquarters, AEF, British Isles, 16 September 1917

Detachment attached to Royal Flying Corps for training, 16 September 1917 – 14 January 1918

- Air Service Headquarters, AEF, 19 September 1917

Detachments attached to Training Section, AEF, 19 September – 25 December 1917

- Third Aviation Instruction Center, 23 September 1917
- 1st Air Depot, December, 1918
- Services of Supply, c. 6 January – c. 18 March 1919
- Eastern Department, c. 5–14 April 1919
- 17th Pursuit Group, while in Regular Army Inactive status
- 8th Pursuit Group, 25 June 1932
- Iceland Base Command, 6 August 1941
- 342nd Composite Group, 11 September 1942
- 24th Composite Wing, 18 March 1944
- Iceland Base Command, 15 June 1944 – 9 June 1945
- 37th Fighter-Bomber Group, 8 April – 15 June 1953
- 342nd Fighter-Day Group, 25 July – 19 November 1956
- 363rd Tactical Reconnaissance Wing (later 363rd Tactical Fighter Wing), 15 October 1969 – 1 October 1982
- 363rd Tactical Fighter Wing), 1 January 1985
- 363rd Operations Group, 1 May 1992 – 15 November 1993
- 27th Special Operations Group, 29 May 2009 – present

=== Stations ===
- Camp Kelly (later Kelly field), Texas, 12 June – 11 August 1917
- Etampes, France, 19 September 1917
- Clermont-Ferrand, France, c. 25 September 1917
- Issoudun Aerodrome, France, December 1917
- Bordeaux, France, 6 January – 18 March 1919
- Mitchel Field, New York, 5–14 April 1919
- Langley Field, Virginia, 25 June 1932
- Mitchel Field, New York, 14 November 1940 – 27 July 1941
- Meeks Field, Iceland, 6 August 1941 – 9 June 1945
- Camp Kilmer, New Jersey, 20–22 June 1945
- Clovis Air Force Base, New Mexico, 8 April – 25 June 1953
- Myrtle Beach Air Force Base, South Carolina, 25 July – 19 November 1956
- Shaw Air Force Base, South Carolina, 1 October 1969 – 1 October 1982, 1 January 1985 – 15 November 1993
- Cannon Air Force Base, New Mexico, 29 May 2009 – present

=== Aircraft ===
- Nieuport 83, 1918
- Boeing P-12, 1932–1935
- Curtiss P-6 Hawk, 1933–1936, 1937–1940
- Consolidated P-30, 1936–1939
- Curtiss YP-37, 1937–1940
- Northrop A-17, 1937–1940
- Curtiss P-36 Hawk, 1939–1940
- Curtiss P-40 Warhawk, 1940–1944
- Bell P-39 Airacobra, 1942–1943
- Republic P-47 Thunderbolt, 1944–1945
- McDonnell RF-4C Phantom II, 1969–1982
- General Dynamics F-16 Fighting Falcon, 1985–1993
- General Atomics MQ-9 Reaper, 2009 – present

== See also ==
- List of American Aero Squadrons
