= William S. Key =

United States Army Major general and businessman

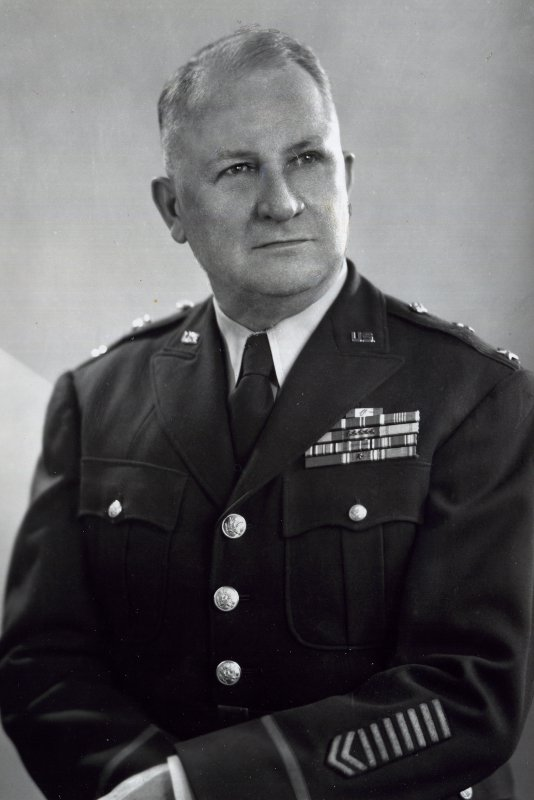
- Official portrait, 1946
- Born: William Shaffer Key; October 6, 1889; Dudleyville, Alabama, US
- Died: January 5, 1959 (aged 69); Oklahoma City, Oklahoma, US
- Military career
- Allegiance: United States
- Branch: United States Army
- Service years: 1907–1949
- Rank: Major general
- Service number: 0-153045
- Commands: Iceland Base Command; United States Army Europe; 45th Infantry Division; 160th Field Artillery Regiment
- Conflicts: Pancho Villa Expedition; World War I: Champagne Defensive; Battle of Château-Thierry; Battle of Saint-Mihiel; Meuse–Argonne offensive; World War II: Occupation of Iceland
- Awards: Distinguished Service Medal (2); Legion of Merit; Bronze Star Medal; Army Commendation Medal
- Other work: Warden of the Oklahoma State Penitentiary

William Shaffer Key (October 6, 1889 – January 5, 1959) was a decorated officer of the United States Army with the rank of major general, and businessman. A member of the Oklahoma National Guard, he was called into federal service and participated in combat on the Western Front during World War I as the division quartermaster of 7th Division.

Following the war, Key returned to the National Guard, also holding several civil assignments including warden of the Oklahoma State Penitentiary, chairman of the Oklahoma Pardon and Parole Board, director of the Security National Bank, and state administrator of the Oklahoma Works Progress Administration.

Key returned to active service in September 1940 as commanding general of the 45th Infantry Division, later embarking overseas for duty as Provost Marshal General of the European Theater of Operations. He then served as commanding general, Iceland Base Command, and completed his service as Chief of the Military Control Commission for Hungary in 1946.

== Early career ==
William S. Key was born on October 6, 1889, in Dudleyville, Alabama, as the son of Cullen R. and Hadassah Key. Both of his grandfathers had served in the Confederate Army during the Civil War. He completed high school in Opelika, Alabama and enlisted the Georgia National Guard as private on April 7, 1907. He was commissioned second lieutenant in summer 1910, but left the National Guard one year later, when his family moved to Oklahoma.

Key settled in the town of Wewoka and established the Key Hardware Co. and the Wewoka Gas Co. and enlisted the Oklahoma National Guard. He was commissioned again and promoted to first lieutenant on July 12, 1912, and to captain in summer 1916. Key then assumed command of Company G, 1st Oklahoma Infantry Regiment stationed in Wewoka and served on the Mexican Border during the Pancho Villa Expedition, when his unit was called up for federal service in March 1917 at Fort Sill, Oklahoma.

Following the United States' entry into World War I, Key was promoted to the rank of major and embarked for France. He was attached to the headquarters, 7th Division under Brigadier General Charles H. Barth and served as divisional quartermaster during Champagne Defensive, Château-Thierry, Saint-Mihiel and the Meuse–Argonne offensive. While in France, he was promoted to the rank of lieutenant colonel and then to colonel.

== Civil career during interwar period ==
Key returned to the United States in early 1919, re-entering both the hardware business and the Oklahoma National Guard. During the rising racial tensions in Okmulgee and Tulsa counties, Governor Jack C. Walton declared martial law and Key commanded Oklahoma City military district. Key was appointed warden at Oklahoma State Penitentiary in McAlester in early 1924 and held that job until late 1927. He was also president of the Wardens Association of the United States in 1926 and chaired the Oklahoma Pardon and Parole Board from 1928 to 1932.

In 1927, Key moved to Oklahoma City and established the Keyokla Oil Company and a real estate business in the Key Building. He was a director of numerous business in the banking sector including Security National Bank from 1928 to 1929 and First National Bank and Trust Company from 1929 to 1933. Key was promoted to brigadier general in the Oklahoma National Guard in August 1928.

He was also active during the Great Depression, when he served as head of the Executive Relief Committee in Oklahoma City, responsible for the coordination of public and private relief efforts to local citizens. Key was also appointed state administrator of the Oklahoma Works Progress Administration (WPA) in 1935. During his tenure, he directed a progressive program during which 350 schools and 20 libraries were constructed, along with the building of Oklahoma National Guard armories; from a total of 126 armories built in the United States, 53 were built in Oklahoma under the supervision of Key. Also due to his work in the WPA, Oklahoma received forty-three million dollars in WPA funds, employing more than one hundred thousand Oklahomans.

In 1936, Key was inducted to the Oklahoma Hall of Fame. Key was also involved in politics as the Democratic candidate for Governor in January 1938. During the campaign, Key was accused by another candidate of irregularity in the building of one of the state armories. Even though Key denied that, he lost to Leon Phillips by the difference of 3,300 votes. He then worked as director of Lincoln Income Life Insurance Company in Louisville, Kentucky until 1941.

== Military career during the Interwar period ==
Key remained active in the Oklahoma National Guard during the 1920s and 1930s. Following his return from France, Key reverted to the rank of lieutenant colonel and served as commanding officer of the 160th Field Artillery Regiment until July 1925. Following his promotion to brigadier general on August 18, 1928, he was appointed commanding general, 70th Field Artillery Brigade. In February 1937, Key was appointed commanding general of the 45th Infantry Division, and was promoted to major general in April of that year.

== World War II ==
Due to worsening situation in Europe, Key was called up into active service in September 1940 and led his command during the Louisiana Maneuvers in the fall of the year. He then received additional duty as commanding general, Fort Sill, Oklahoma and was responsible for the training and preparation of 45th Infantry Division for service overseas.

Key held another additional duty as acting commanding general, V Corps from January 1942 to May 1942 and embarked for Europe for duty as provost marshal general of the European Theater of Operations with headquarters in London, England. The Provost Marshall function in the ETO was one of 18 Special Staff Sections of Communications Zone, ETO under Lt. Gen. John C. H. Lee. While in this capacity, he established the school for Military Police and during a thirty-day course, students were trained mostly in the map reading; methods of patrolling towns liberated from Germany; guarding of the prisoners of war and other.

He served in this capacity under a succession of Theater Commanders, including Dwight D. Eisenhower, and then Lieutenant General Frank M. Andrews until the beginning of May 1943, when the plane carrying Andrews crashed on Iceland. Key then served as acting Commanding General, United States Army Europe for five days, before Lieutenant General Jacob L. Devers arrived from the States and relieved him. Key then resumed his duties as provost marshal and was succeeded by Major General Milton Reckord in June that year.

Key then assumed duty as commanding general, Iceland Base Command and was responsible for the defense of the island and administration of garrison of 40,000 soldiers. He remained in that assignment until December 1944 and received numerous decorations including Army Distinguished Service Medal, Legion of Merit, Bronze Star Medal and Army Commendation Medal. The citation for his Army DSM reads:

The President of the United States of America, authorized by Act of Congress July 9, 1918, takes pleasure in presenting the Army Distinguished Service Medal to Major General William S. Key (ASN: 0-153045), United States Army, for exceptionally meritorious and distinguished services to the Government of the United States, in a duty of great responsibility during the period from June 1943 to December 1944. The singularly distinctive accomplishments of General Key reflect the highest credit upon himself and the United States Army.

Key was also appointed Knight of the Order of the Bath by the United Kingdom and Knight Commander of the Order of the Falcon by the Government of Iceland.

In January 1945, Key was ordered to Hungary and appointed chief of the Military Control Commission. While in this capacity, he was responsible for the directing of the repatriation of displaced persons; supervision of the demobilization of Hungarian armed forces; return of property taken by Germany and regulation and supervision of the execution of the armistice terms. Key was succeeded by Brigadier General George H. Weems in August 1946 and received his second Army Distinguished Service Medal for his service.

== Postwar period ==
Key was subsequently ordered back to the United States and retired from active duty. He remained active in Oklahoma National Guard as secretary to adjutant general until October 1949 and received Oklahoma Distinguished Service Medal for his long meritorious service with the guard. He then assumed job as director of Oklahoma Natural Gas Company and simultaneously served as president of the board of directors of Oklahoma Historical Society.

In 1948 the University of Oklahoma presented Key with a Distinguished Service Citation, and later the university awarded him an honorary LLB degree. The main entrance at Fort Sill, Oklahoma is named after Key. Key was a Freemason and raised to the Sublime Degree of Master Mason in 1913 at Seminole Lodge No. 147 and was made Sovereign Grand Inspector General of Oklahoma in 1951.

Major General William S. Key died on January 5, 1959, aged 69, in Oklahoma City, Oklahoma, and was buried at Memorial Park Cemetery there. He was married to Irene Genevieve Davis Key and they had two sons and one daughter. Their older son, Robert Carleton Key (1926–1988), served in the U.S. Army and retired as major.

== Decorations ==
Here is Major General Key's ribbon bar:

1st Row	Army Distinguished Service Medal with Oak Leaf Cluster		
2nd Row	Legion of Merit	Bronze Star Medal	Army Commendation Medal
3rd Row	Mexican Service Medal	World War I Victory Medal with five Battle Clasps	American Defense Service Medal
4th Row	American Campaign Medal	European-African-Middle Eastern Campaign Medal	World War II Victory Medal
5th Row	Knight of the Order of the Bath (Great Britain)	Knight Commander of the Order of the Falcon (Iceland)	Oklahoma Distinguished Service Medal

Military offices
Preceded by Charles E. McPherren	Commanding General 45th Infantry Division; 1937–1942	Succeeded by Troy H. Middleton
Preceded by Edmund L. Daley	Commanding General V Corps; January−May 1942	Succeeded by Russell P. Hartle
Preceded by Charles Hartwell Bonesteel Jr.	Commanding General Iceland Base Command; 1943–1944	Succeeded by Early Duncan
