= Iceland Base Command =

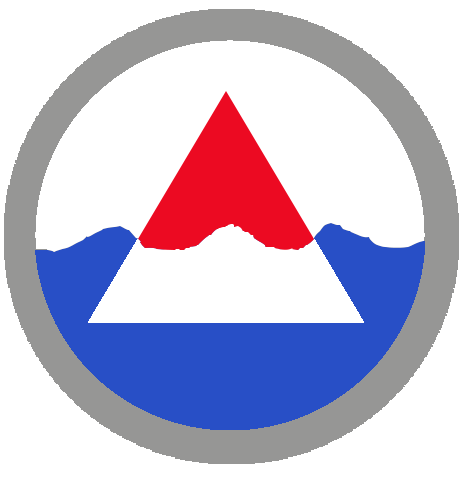
- Emblem of the Iceland Base Command
- Active: July 1941 – March 1947
- Country: United States
- Branch: United States Army
- Type: Command
- Role: Transport and Defensive
- Part of: European Theater of Operations, United States Army
- Garrison/HQ: Camp Pershing near Reykjavík

Commanders
- Notable commanders: Charles H. Bonesteel Jr. William S. Key

Iceland Base Command (IBC) is an inactive United States Army organization. It was established for the United States defense of the Kingdom of Iceland during World War II. It was inactivated on 4 March 1947.

== History ==
=== Origins ===
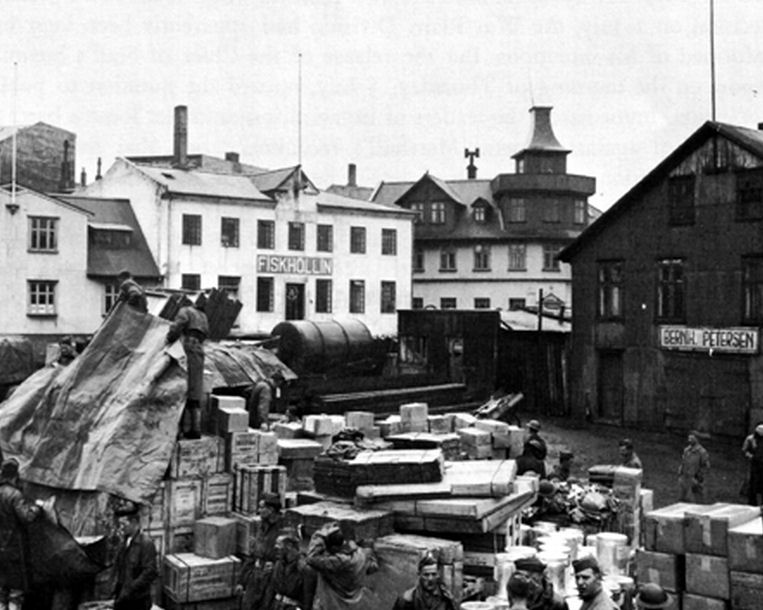
Temporary Supply Dump in Reykjavík 1941

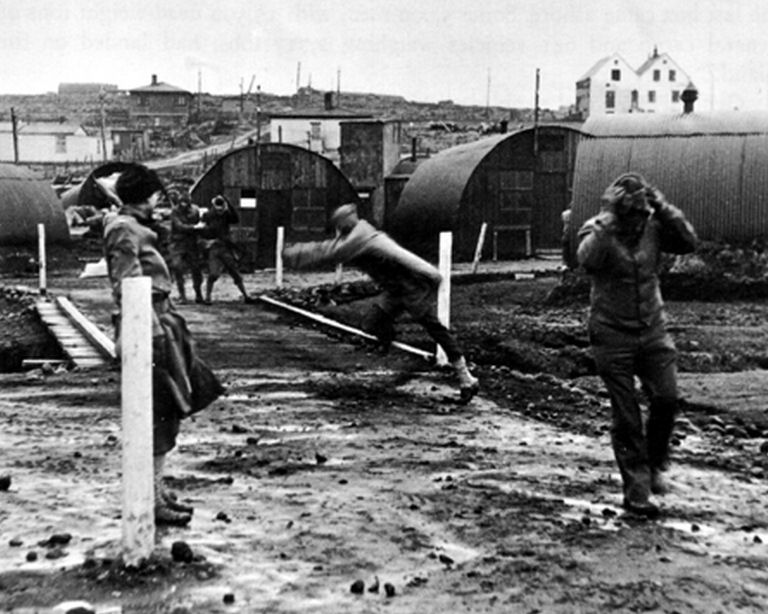
Building Nissen Huts in a gale 1942

Iceland was an important stepping stone between Europe and the New World in North America. Hitler several times toyed with the idea of a descent upon the island and laid preliminary plans for it; but to forestall such a move British troops, soon joined by a Canadian force, had landed in Iceland on 10 May 1940. Icelandic annoyance with the British and Canadian garrison, and British losses in the war, which made a withdrawal of the Iceland garrison seem desirable, plus the United States concern for the Atlantic sea lanes, combined to bring Iceland within the American defense orbit.

In 1941, weakened by the withdrawal of some 50,000 troops in Greece and surprised by greatly reinforced German and Italian forces, Britain's Army of the Nile had been driven back, with serious losses, across the African deserts to the Egyptian border. Disaster in Greece, following hard upon the rout in North Africa, added 11,000 dead and missing to the casualties of the African campaign. The British therefore felt a pressing need for the 20,000 or so troops tied down in Iceland.

Iceland, no less than Britain, was anxious to have the British garrison depart. Intensely nationalistic, proud of their ancient civilization, the Icelanders chafed under the "protective custody" in which they found themselves placed. They felt at first, when Canadian troops made up a large part of the total force, that a wholly British contingent would be preferable, but when the Canadians were later replaced by British troops most Icelanders seemed to find their lot no more bearable than before. As the scope of Germany's aerial blitzkrieg widened, the people of Iceland grew more uneasy; for it to be "defended" by one of the belligerent powers, they felt, was an open invitation to attack by the other. The Icelandic Government shared the apprehensions of the people and found further annoyance in Britain's control of Iceland's export trade.

The Icelandic Government had, as early as mid-July 1940, approached the United States Department of State concerning the possibility of Iceland's coming under the aegis of the Monroe Doctrine. The Department of State was unwilling to take a firm decision, and said it did not want to tie its hands. German successes in the North Atlantic increased. On 10 April 1941, while picking up survivors from a Dutch vessel torpedoed off the coast of Iceland, the U.S. destroyer USS Niblack (DD-424), which earlier in the month had been given the job of reconnoitering the waters about the island, went into action against a U-boat whose approach was taken as an intention to attack. This was the first of a number of "incidents" that were to take place in the waters south of Iceland, where from this time forward the safety zone of the Western Hemisphere and Germany's blockade area overlapped. On 13 April President Roosevelt received assurances from Prime Minister Churchill that Britain was determined to fight through to a decision in North Africa. American goods and munitions would perhaps be the deciding factor in the campaign.

Preparations for sending an Army survey party were made. Discussions between General Chaney's staff and British officers had begun on 4 June on such matters as housing the American troops, the antiaircraft defense of Iceland, and the necessary fighter plane strength; and it was decided that a joint Admiralty, Air, and War Ministry committee would collaborate with the Special Observer Group in planning the relief of the British forces. The War Department began its preliminary planning at once. Since only a meager body of firsthand data was available, the point of departure had to be the decision itself (that American troops would immediately and completely relieve the British garrison) and from that point planning had to proceed on the basis of the two known factors: that approximately 30,000 troops would be required.

An agreement with the Government of Denmark was concluded on 7 July 1941 for the United States to relieve the British and Canadian forces on Iceland. The 33rd Pursuit Squadron arrived at RAF Kaldadarnes on 6 August 1941. Plans were made and on 5 September 1941, a convoy got under way for the movement of U.S. Army troops to Iceland. Guarded through coastal waters by vessels of the First and Third Naval Districts, the transports and accompanying freighters on the following day picked up their ocean escort and destroyer screen at a meeting point off the coast of Maine. Four days later, during the night of 15–16 September, the convoy reached Iceland safely.

=== United States Army ===
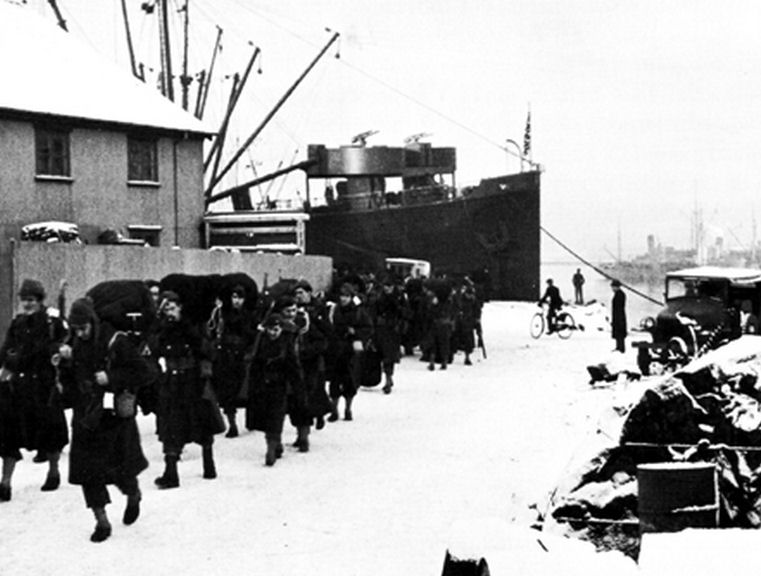
US Army troops arriving in Reykjavík, January 1942

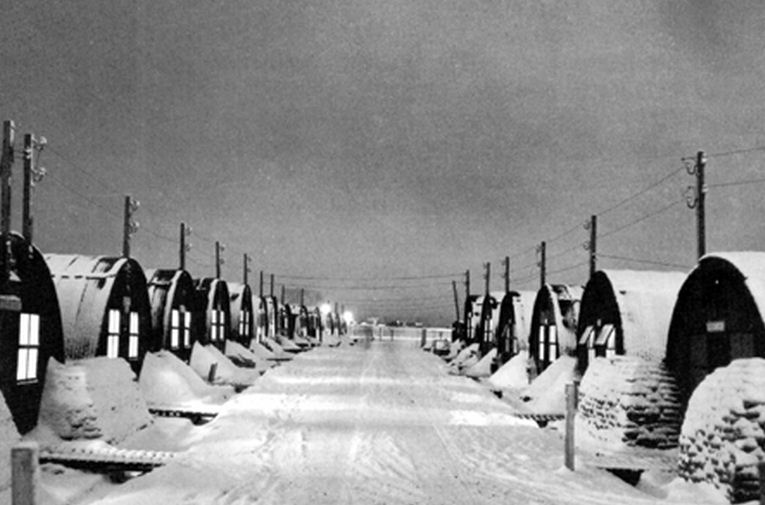
Camp Pershing, Iceland 1942

As outposts of defense, the North Atlantic bases were only imperceptibly affected by the entry of the United States into the war in December 1941. More than two months before, instructions had gone out to the American garrisons to dispute actively the approach of any Axis military plane or naval vessel. Iceland had gone on the alert even earlier. The ultimate decision that would bring into action the guns of the American garrisons had thus rested with Hitler and on his view of what was expedient. It had not depended on America's status, whether of belligerency, nonbelligerency, or neutrality. In recognition of these circumstances, reinforcements had been dispatched to the Atlantic outposts throughout most of 1941.

This is not to say that the bases in the Atlantic escaped, even for a time, the hard impact of war. The affirmation in the ARCADIA Conference (the Anglo-American conference in Washington, December 1941 – January 1942) of the strategy of concentrating an American air force in the United Kingdom acted as a catalyst on the hitherto uncertain and somewhat nebulous proposals that the United States take over the North Atlantic air route-the shortest path between America and the European front. As way stations on this route both Greenland and Iceland now acquired a new importance, in which Newfoundland, as one of the terminal points, shared.

The United States Forces remained directly under General Headquarters, United States Army until 16 June 1942 when the Icelandic Defense Command was established. IDF was placed under the jurisdiction of the CG ETOUSA for training and operations. At the same time, it remained under the War Department for administrative purposes and continued to be supplied by the United States Navy and United States Army Air Forces.

In March 1943, the commanding general, Iceland Base Command was charged with the defense of the territory of Iceland under his control and the training of units under his command in accord with directives issued by the commanding general, European Theater of Operations, United States Army (ETOUSA). In addition he was to comply with whatever special and specific instructions the CG ETOUSA might from time to time direct. Defense and training remained the primary mission of the command after its removal from ETOUSA Control.

Of the four outposts in the North Atlantic, Iceland alone presented a major, immediate problem. The reinforcement of Newfoundland and Bermuda would require the transportation of comparatively small numbers and the distances were not great. Greenland would be frozen in until spring. Furthermore, early plans and prior commitments and the desire of the British to transfer their garrison gave Iceland a special position in the tug of European strategy

After the arrival of the December troop convoy a battalion of marines had taken over the positions of one of the British infantry battalions, which was immediately returned to the United Kingdom. Then the 2nd Battalion, 10th Infantry, which arrived in the January convoy, took over from the marine battalion and it returned to the United States. No troops arrived in February. In March a small British force and the last remaining units of the marine brigade departed upon the arrival of the 2nd Infantry (minus one battalion) and accompanying units. A large American convoy arrived in mid-April and another in May with a total of about 8,700 troops, and this enabled most of the remaining British troops to be withdrawn. After 11 May only the British 146 Infantry Brigade, distributed among the three outports of Akureyri, Seydisfjordur, and Budareyri, and some Royal Air Force units remained. The better part of the job the United States had undertaken twelve months before was accomplished. There were now, at the beginning of June 1942, about 24,000 American troops in Iceland; but in the meantime Iceland's defense requirements had risen. The building of the Keflavik airfields, air ferrying activity, and troop transport operations over the sea lanes, and the fact that the United States had become one of the belligerents all meant that the size of the garrison had to be revised upward. Shortly after Iceland's inclusion in June in the new European Theater of Operations, large additions to the American forces arrived in July, August, October, and December, so that by the end of 1942 the garrison in Iceland had grown to approximately 38,000 men stationed at nearly 300 camps and posts.

=== Air Transport Command ===
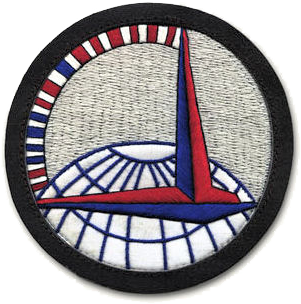
Air Transport Command emblem

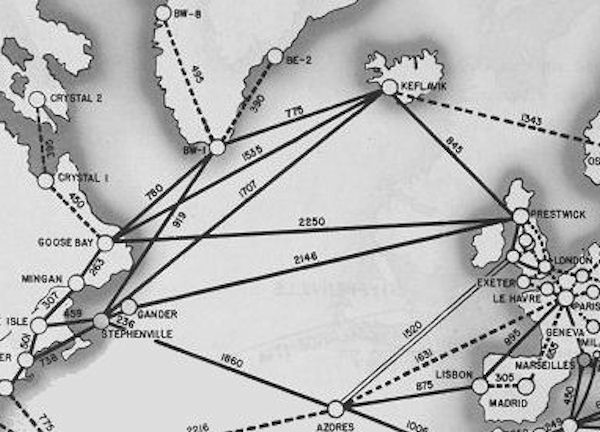
North Atlantic air ferry routes to England, 1945.

The Army Air Forces, GHQ AF, and the Iceland Base Command had for some time been united in favor of a heavy bomber field in Iceland in 1941. During November and December 1941 site and soil surveys, reports, and recommendations had been made, every one of them favorable. With the concurrence of the Air Forces, that the Army Engineers at once begin construction of an airfield in the vicinity of Keflavik suitable for heavy bombers and that the necessary funds be provided.

In the meantime, commander of the Iceland Base Command's air forces, had been unobtrusively getting the construction of a new fighter field under way as part of the basic defense mission. As soon as the bomber field received official approval, the fighter field was fitted into the project as a satellite field. Thus, considerable progress had already been made by the time the first civilian construction gangs arrived in May.

However, the need by Army Air Corps Ferrying Command (later:Air Transport Command) for a transient ferrying airfield on Iceland and the availability of bomber bases in England led to Ferrying Command taking jurisdiction of the planned airfields near Keflavik. Ultimately both a long-range transport airfield, used for ferrying multi-engine bombers was constructed, as well as a fighter airfield for the air defense of Iceland.

Construction work on the main ferrying and transport airfield, Meeks Field, 63°59′03″N 22°36′24″W was started on 2 July by the Army Corps of Engineers and was taken over in August by one of the first Navy Seabee units organized on Iceland. A B-18 Bolo bomber, carrying high-ranking officers and their guests, made the first landing at Meeks Field on 24 March 1943. All major construction, including four 6,500 ft (2,000 m) runways were completed by the end of July 1943. Meeks became headquarters for Iceland Base Command. Its long runway was used for ferrying of multi-engined aircraft on flights between the US and the UK. The major American military units at Meeks Field were:

- 824th Engineering Battalion (Aviation) (February 1942 – 28 August 1943)
- 342nd Composite Group

HQ located at Meeks Field, Squadrons operated from Patterson Field, (11 September 1942 – 18 March 1944)

- 14th Det, North Atlantic Wing, Air Transport Command (ATC Station #14), (28 August 1943 – 1 August 1944)
- Iceland Base Command (16 June 1942 – 24 March 1947)
- 2nd Service Group, 29 March 1943 – 1 October 1945

14th Air Service Squadron, 1 October-28 December 1945

- 1386th Army Air Force Base Unit (1 August 1944 – 18 February 1946)

Army Engineers were also set to work on construction of Patterson Field (Originally Svidningar field), 63°57′31″N 22°32′58″W as the satellite airfield to Meeks was soon named. Completed before Meeks became operational, the first planes of the Eighth Air Force began coming through Patterson on their way to England, early in July 1942 when two of its three runways were in use. With the opening of Meeks it was primarily used by Iceland Base Command as a fighter base by the 342nd Composite Group for air defense, however it remained in use by ATC as an overflow base for ferrying single-engine aircraft on the North Atlantic Transport Route due to its short runways and congestion at Meeks.

At the peak of the Second World War, thousands of USAAF airmen were stationed at the airfields (Meeks and Patterson ) near Keflavik in temporary Quonset hut camps.

Reykjavík Airport, 64°07′48″N 021°56′26″W, first used in 1919 as a grass civil airfield, was rebuilt for the Royal Air Force in October 1940 as RAF Reykjavik. It was used as a civil/military airfield during the war and remained under RAF jurisdiction, however it was also used by ATC as an overflow base.

By the end of November 1943 the Greenland airfields had been completely graded and surfaced. All the links in the "Snowball" or North Atlantic air ferry route to England had been filled in. "The major problems concerned with aircraft ferrying had been largely solved," states the official history of the Air Transport Command. "Ferrying had become virtually a routine operation."

=== 342nd Composite Group ===
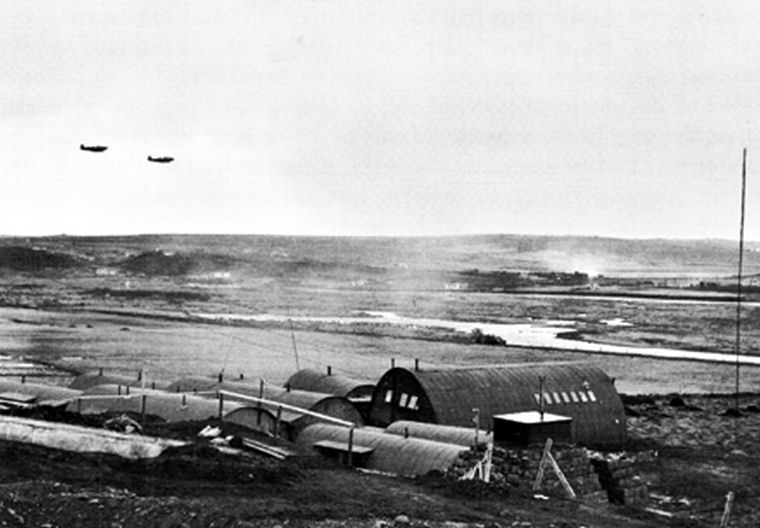
American Fighter Planes over Camp Artun, 1943

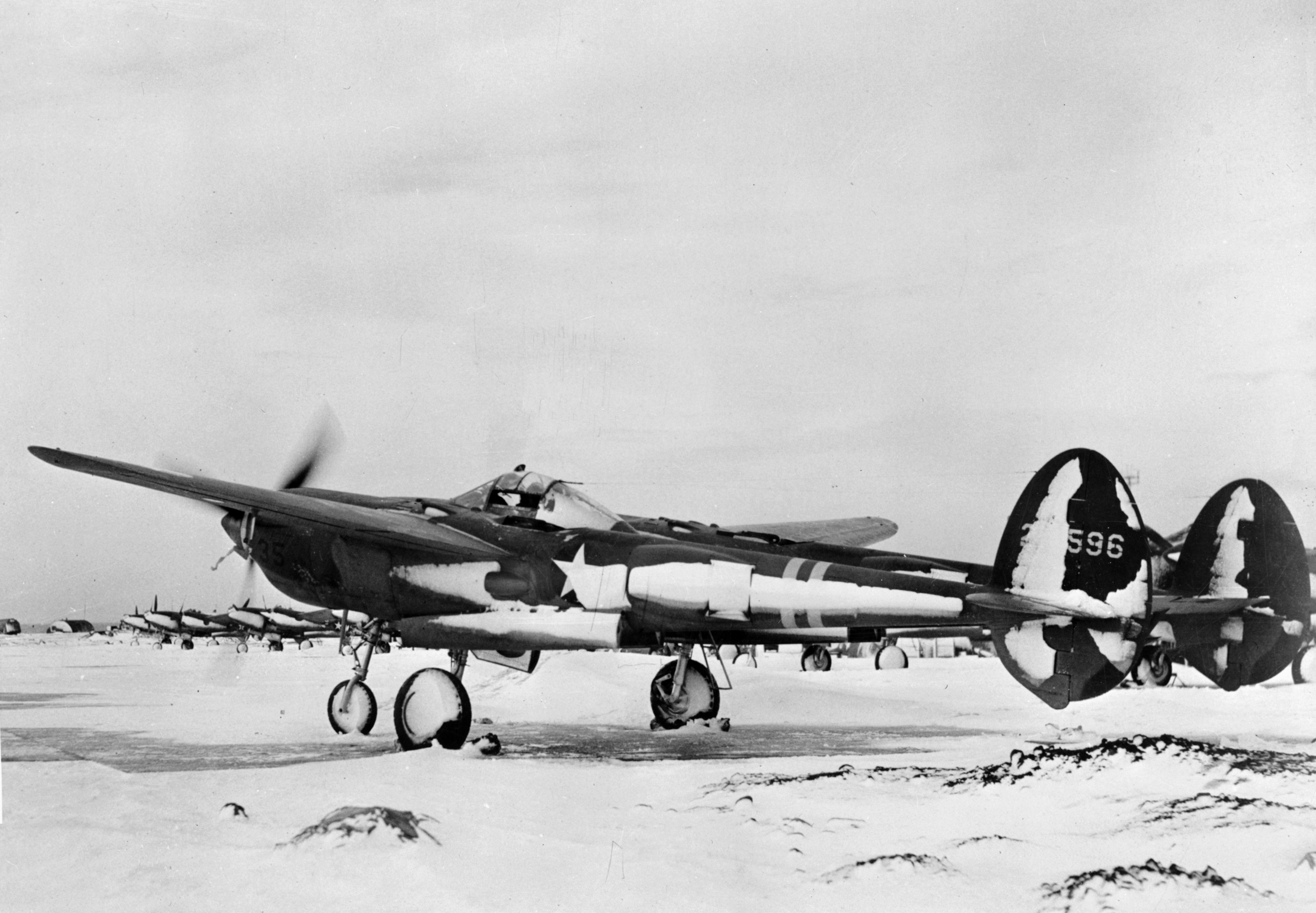
Lockheed P-38F-5-LO Lightning 42-12596 of the 50th Fighter Squadron in Iceland, 1942

The 342nd Composite Group was activated at Meeks Field on 11 September 1942, however its aircraft operated largely from Patterson Field due to the congestion of ATC traffic at Meeks. It reported directly to the HQ, IBC. The group flew a mixture of P-38 Lightning and P-40 Warhawk fighters, as well as some B-18 Bolos and P-39 Airacobras assigned to the Group's Base Flight. Operational squadrons were:

- 33rd Fighter Squadron, (P-40s), 11 September 1942 – 18 March 1944
- 50th Fighter Squadron (P-38s), 14 November 1942 – 1 February 1944
- 337th Fighter Squadron (P-38s), 11 September – 26 November 1942

The group's mission was the aerial defense of Iceland by intercepting and destroying some of the German planes that on occasion attempted to attack Iceland or that appeared in that area on reconnaissance missions. The unit also conducted antisubmarine patrols in the North Atlantic and provided cover for convoys on the run to Murmansk, Soviet Union.

The USAAF first engaged enemy forces near Iceland on 28 April 1942 and had been followed by a three months' lull. Then in late July three more encounters took place. Up to this point the honors had gone to the Norwegian patrol squadron, which, under RAF command, was operating off the northern and eastern coast; but it was not long before the American air forces in Iceland had their chances at the Nazis. Having missed being the first to engage the enemy, an American plane became the first to bring one down.

On the morning of 14 August 1942 two American fighter pilots, Lt. E. E. Shahan and Lt. J. D. Shaffer, intercepted and destroyed a Focke-Wulf Fw 200 about ten miles north of Reykjavík. It was the first German plane of the war to be shot down by the Army Air Forces.

During the next two months American fighter planes of the Iceland Base Command bagged two more German planes, intercepted and attacked seven, and unsuccessfully tried to intercept three others. Planes of the Norwegian RAF squadron, meanwhile, had met and attacked three German aircraft with varying degrees of success, and during the same period the ground troops opened fire on German planes a dozen times. A few planes appeared during the winter, but none was intercepted and only two came under antiaircraft fire. Some of this air activity over the North Atlantic was undoubtedly related to the enemy's efforts to set up weather and radio stations in Greenland.

The spring of 1943 promised to be just as lively. In April German planes were spotted or reported on at least ten occasions. One of the intruders, a Junkers Ju 88 bomber, was shot down at the end of the month by two planes of the 50th Fighter Squadron. Throughout the year the number of enemy or unidentified planes reported was about 15 percent less than in 1942. Actual contacts were considerably fewer. Apparently the German planes were successfully avoiding the antiaircraft defenses and evading the American fighters.

On 5 August American planes, making their second interception of the year, shot down another German bomber, the fifth and last enemy plane to be destroyed over Iceland.

After the summer of 1943, little German activity was noted over the North Atlantic skies. The enemy was on the defensive, and the American defensive outposts in the Atlantic (Iceland, Greenland, Newfoundland and Bermuda) were shifting to secondary roles.

The 342nd Composite Group was inactivated on 18 March 1944. Its squadrons were reassigned to England and the Eighth and Ninth Air Forces.

IBC was removed from ETOUA and transferred to the jurisdiction of the Army Eastern Defense Command, 30 July 1944. It was further transferred to the jurisdiction of the United States Army Air Forces effective 1 January 1946.

=== Postwar era ===
See Naval Air Station Keflavik for Department of Defense activities in Iceland, 1951–2006

Following World War II, all United States military personnel were withdrawn from Iceland as specified in the original agreement. All United States Army and Naval forces were withdrawn by the end of 1945. Reykjavík Airport was turned over to the Icelandic government by the RAF on 6 July 1946.

Another agreement signed between the United States and Iceland in 1946 permitted continued use of Keflavik Airport for flights in support of occupation forces in Europe. The United States provided all the maintenance and operation of Keflavik Airport through an American civilian contractor. Once the civil infrastructure was in place, Iceland Base Command was discontinued on 24 March 1947 and USAAF air activity ended at both Patterson and Meeks (Keflavik Airport) Field on 31 March 1947.

Iceland's charter membership in NATO in 1949 required neither the establishment of an Icelandic armed force, nor the stationing of foreign troops in the country during peacetime. However, the Cold War with the Soviet Union and growing world tensions caused Iceland's leaders to think otherwise.

Icelandic officials decided that membership in the NATO alliance was not a sufficient defense and, at the request of NATO, entered into a defense agreement with the United States. This was the beginning of the Iceland Defense Force. During the past four decades, the Defense Force was "at the front" of the Cold War and was credited with playing a significant role in deterrence, and in 1951, the United States Air Force re-established a presence in Iceland, and the former Meeks Field, now known as Keflavik Airport, which became a NATO transport and interceptor base during the Cold War.

=== Commanders ===
- Major General (USMC) John Marston, Commander of the U.S. Occupation Forces (6 Aug 1941 - 16 Sep 1941)
- Major General (USA) Charles Hartwell Bonesteel Jr., Commanding General Iceland Base Command (16 Sep 1941 - 18 Jun 1943)
- Major General (USA) William S. Key, Commanding General Iceland Base Command (18 Jun 1943 - 4 Dec 1944)
- Brigadier General (USA) Early Edward Walters Duncan, Commanding General Iceland Base Command (4 Dec 1944 - 31 Dec 1945)

== See also ==
1. Newfoundland Base Command
2. Greenland Base Command
3. Bermuda Base Command
4. Caribbean Defense Command
5. Alaska Defense Command
6. Northwest Service Command
