= Charles Hartwell Bonesteel Jr. =

United States Army general

Charles H. Bonesteel Jr.
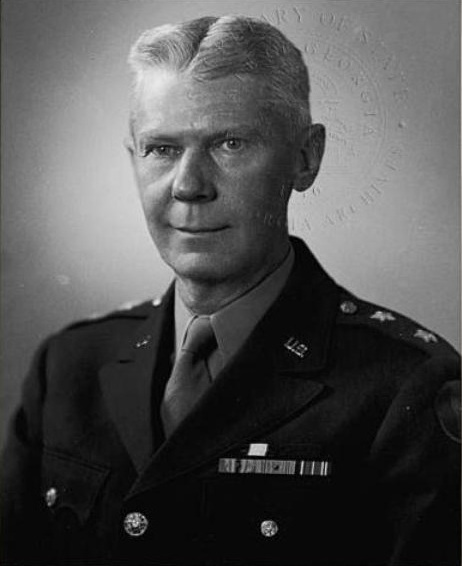
- Major General Charles H. Bonesteel Jr.
- Born: April 9, 1885; Fort Sidney, Nebraska, US
- Died: June 5, 1964 (aged 79); Washington, D.C., US
- Burial place: Arlington National Cemetery
- Relatives: Major Charles Hartwell Bonesteel Sr. (Father); General Charles Hartwell Bonesteel III (Son); Lieutenant General Charles Bertody Stone III (Nephew)
- Military career
- Allegiance: United States
- Branch: United States Army
- Service years: 1908–1947
- Rank: Major General
- Service number: 0-2372
- Unit: United States Army Infantry School
- Commands: 1st Battalion 18th Infantry Regiment; 1st Battalion 2nd Infantry Regiment; 19th Infantry Regiment; Sixth Corps Area; 5th Infantry Division; Iceland Base Command; United States Army Infantry School; Western Defense Command; G-1 Section, Supreme Headquarters Allied Expeditionary Force; General Inspectorate Section, U.S. European Theater of Operations; War Department Manpower Board
- Conflicts: World War I World War II
- Awards: Distinguished Service Medal; Legion of Merit; Bronze Star Medal

Charles Hartwell Bonesteel Jr. (April 9, 1885 – June 5, 1964) was a major general in the United States Army. He commanded the United States Army Infantry School and the G-1 (personnel) staff section of Supreme Headquarters Allied Expeditionary Force during World War II. He was the father of General Charles H. Bonesteel III.

== Early life ==
The son of U.S. Army Major Charles Hartwell Bonesteel Sr. (1851 – 1902; West Point, 1876), the second Charles H. Bonesteel (pronounced "Bonn-eh-stel") was born at Fort Sidney, Nebraska, on April 9, 1885. His mother Mary Greene Bonesteel, was the daughter of Oliver Duff Greene, who received the Medal of Honor for heroism at the Battle of Antietam. Bonesteel graduated from the United States Military Academy in 1908 and was appointed a second lieutenant of Infantry.

== Start of career and World War I ==
His initial assignments included postings in the Philippines, Hawaii and Texas. During World War I he served with the 55th Infantry Regiment, and later at the Newport News, Virginia point of embarkation.

== Post-World War I ==
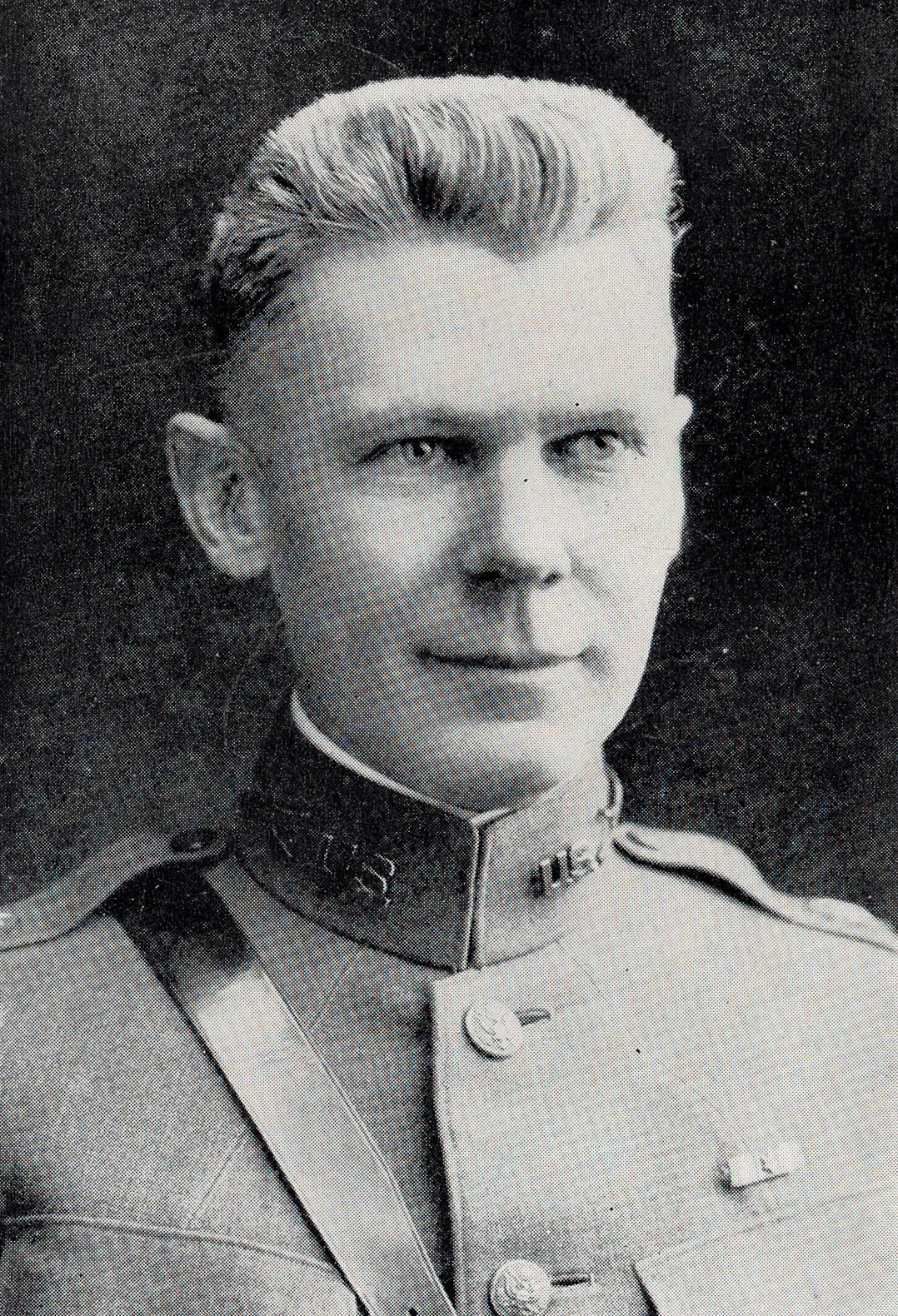
Bonesteel as a West Point Tactical Officer c. 1923

From 1919 to 1924 Bonesteel was an instructor at West Point.

Bonesteel graduated from the United States Army Command and General Staff College in 1926 and served on the staff of the Chief of Infantry until 1930. From 1930 to 1931 Bonesteel was assigned to the 18th Infantry Regiment, first as Commander of its 1st Battalion, and later as the regiment's Executive Officer, or second in command. In 1932 he graduated from the United States Army War College.

From 1932 to 1940 Bonesteel's assignments included: Instructor and Section Chief at the Infantry School; Commander, 1st Battalion 2nd Infantry Regiment; and Commander of the 19th Infantry Regiment.

== World War II ==
Beginning in 1940 Bonesteel's service covered several senior staff and command positions, to include: Chief of Staff, VI Corps Area and Second U.S. Army; Commander, Sixth Corps Area; Commander, 5th Infantry Division; Commander, Iceland Base Command; Commandant of the Infantry School; Commander, Western Defense Command; and Assistant to the Commanding General, Twelfth United States Army Group. He was promoted to brigadier general in 1940 and Major General in 1941.

In 1944 Bonesteel was assigned as Commander of the G-1 (Personnel) Staff Section at SHAEF Headquarters. He remained in this position until 1945, when he was assigned as Chief of the General Inspectorate Section for the U.S. European Theater of Operations. Later in 1945 Bonesteel returned to the United States as President of the War Department Manpower Board, where he served until retiring in 1947.

== Death and burial ==
Bonesteel died at Walter Reed Army Medical Center in Washington, D.C., on June 5, 1964. He was interred at Arlington National Cemetery, Section 3, Site 1374-A.

== Awards and decorations ==
- Army Distinguished Service Medal
- Legion of Merit
- Bronze Star Medal
- Honorary Companion of the Order of the Bath (United Kingdom)
- Légion d'Honneur (France)

== Family ==
In 1908 Bonesteel married Caroline Standish Mead Hudson (1885–1965). Their children included daughter Eleanor and son Charles H. Bonesteel III. Eleanor Bonesteel was the wife of United States Air Force General Nils O. Ohman (1914–1993).

Military offices
Preceded by Joseph M. Cummins	Commanding General 5th Infantry Division; July–August 1941	Succeeded by Cortlandt Parker
Preceded by John Marston	Commanding General Iceland Base Command; 1941–1943	Succeeded by William S. Key
Preceded by Leven C. Allen	Commandant of the United States Army Infantry School; 1943–1944	Succeeded by Fred L. Walker
Preceded by Robert H. Lewis	Commanding General Western Defense Command; July–November 1944	Succeeded by Henry C. Pratt
