= Gary L. North =

United States Air Force general (born 1954)

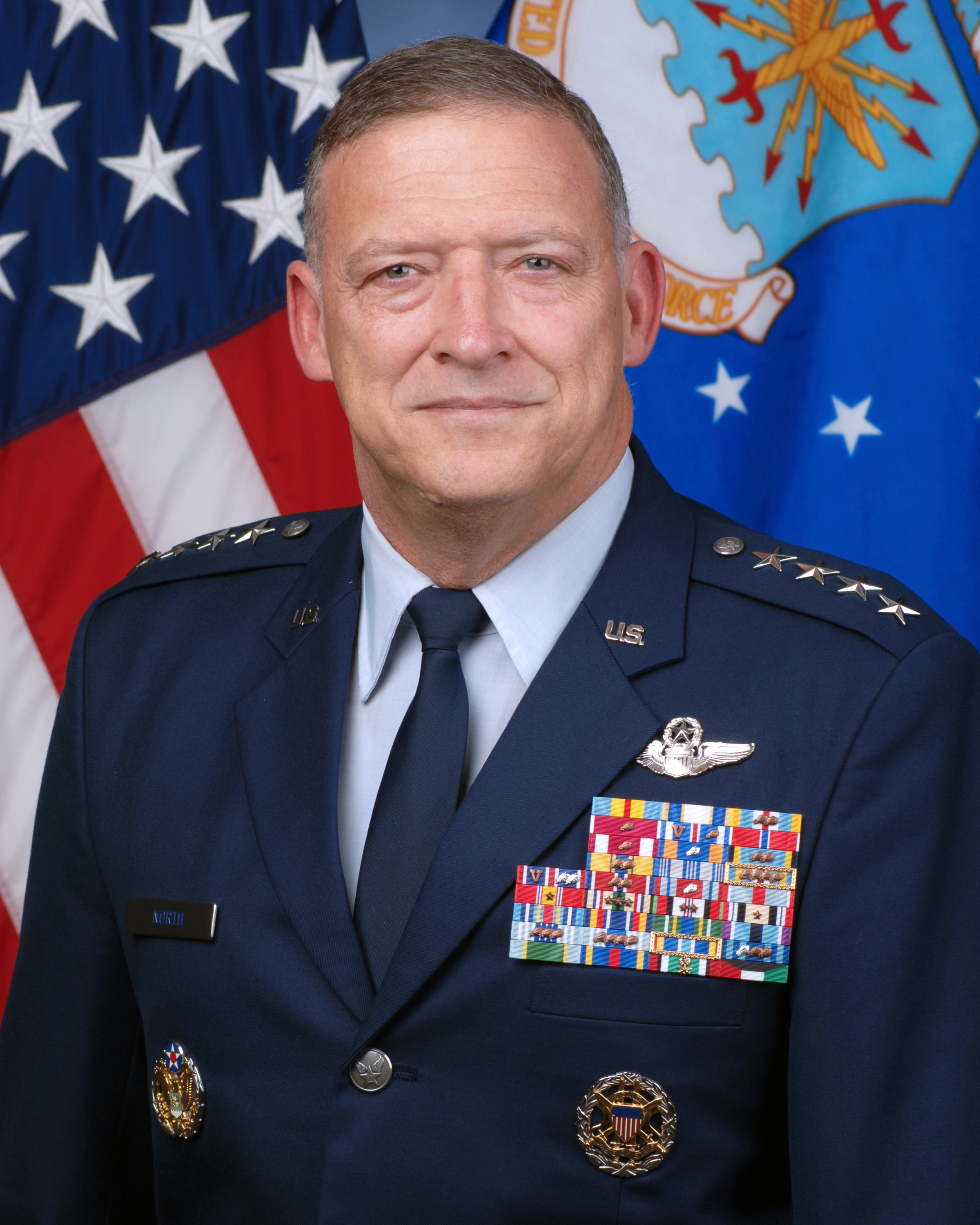
- General Gary L. North, USAF; Commander, Pacific Air Forces
- Born: May 14, 1954 (age 72); Charlottesville, Virginia, U.S.
- Military career
- Allegiance: United States of America
- Branch: United States Air Force
- Service years: 1976–2012
- Rank: General
- Commands: Pacific Air Forces; 9th Air Force; U.S. Air Forces Central; 18th Wing; 8th Fighter Wing; 35th Operations Group; 33rd Fighter Squadron
- Conflicts: Operation Southern Watch; Operation Iraqi Freedom; Operation Enduring Freedom; Operation Desert Shield; Operation Desert Storm
- Awards: Defense Distinguished Service Medal; Air Force Distinguished Service Medal; Defense Superior Service Medal (3); Legion of Merit (2)

Gary Lewis North (born May 14, 1954) is a retired United States Air Force four-star general who served as commander of Pacific Air Forces and executive director of Pacific Air Combat Operations Staff at Hickam Air Force Base, Hawaii, from August 19, 2009, to August 9, 2012. Pacific Air Forces is responsible for Air Force activities spread over half the globe in a command that supports 45,000 airmen serving principally in Hawaii, Alaska, Guam, Korea and Japan.

North was commissioned in 1976 as a distinguished graduate from East Carolina University's Air Force ROTC program. He has held numerous operational, command and staff positions, and has completed four long and four short overseas tours. The general has served two tours on the Joint Staff, serving as executive officer to the director of the Joint Staff, and as director of politico-military affairs for Asia-Pacific, where he was responsible for regional planning and policy for the Asia-Pacific, South Asia and Central Asia regions. He has served on the Air Force Staff as the chief of Joint Requirements Division and deputy director of joint matters, and as the director for operations, U.S. Pacific Command, Camp H.M. Smith, Hawaii. Prior to his last assignment, North was the commander of 9th Air Force and U.S. Air Forces Central, Shaw Air Force Base, S.C., comprising six wings in the 9th AF and eight air expeditionary wings in Air Forces Central, and served as the U.S. Central Command Combined Forces air component commander and service functional air component commander for the wars in Iraq and Afghanistan.

North has also commanded the 33rd Fighter Squadron at Shaw Air Force Base, S.C.; 35th Operations Group at Misawa Air Base, Japan; 8th Fighter Wing at Kunsan Air Base, South Korea; and the 18th Wing at Kadena AB, Japan. He is a command pilot with more than 4,500 flying hours, primarily in the F-4, F-15 and F-16. He flew 83 combat missions in Operations Desert Storm, Southern Watch, Iraqi Freedom and Enduring Freedom.

== Education ==
- 1976 Bachelor of Arts degree in political science, East Carolina University, North Carolina
- 1982 Squadron Officer School, Maxwell AFB, Alabama
- 1984 Master of Public Administration degree, Golden Gate University
- 1986 Master of Science degree in human resource management, Golden Gate University
- 1990 Armed Forces Staff College, Norfolk, Virginia
- 1994 Master of Science degree in national resource strategy, Industrial College of the Armed Forces, National Defense University, Fort Lesley J. McNair, Washington, D.C.
- 1997 Seminar XXI, Massachusetts Institute of Technology, Cambridge

== Assignments ==
1. September 1976 – May 1977, student, undergraduate navigator training, Mather AFB, Calif.
2. May 1977 – October 1978, student, Electronic Warfare Officer School, Mather AFB, Calif.
3. January 1978 – June 1978, student, F-4E upgrade training, Homestead AFB, Fla.
4. July 1978 – July 1979, weapons systems officer, 35th Tactical Fighter Squadron, Kunsan AB, South Korea
5. August 1979 – September 1980, F-4G Wild Weasel electronic warfare officer, 561st and 563rd tactical fighter squadrons, George AFB, Calif.
6. September 1980 – September 1981, student, undergraduate pilot training, Reese AFB, Texas
7. September 1981 – September 1982, fighter lead-in training, Holloman AFB, N.M., and F-16 transition, Hill AFB, Utah
8. September 1982 – April 1985, squadron scheduler and squadron weapons officer, 19th Tactical Fighter Squadron, Shaw AFB, S.C.
9. April 1985 – August 1985, student pilot, U.S. Air Force Fighter Weapons School, Nellis AFB, Nev.
10. August 1985 – June 1986, wing weapons officer, 363rd Tactical Fighter Wing, Shaw AFB, S.C.
11. June 1986 – June 1987, F-16 weapons officer and flight commander, 526th Tactical Fighter Squadron, Ramstein AB, West Germany
12. June 1987 – June 1989, aide-de-camp and F-16 instructor pilot to the Commander-in-Chief of U.S. Air Forces in Europe, Ramstein AB, West Germany
13. July 1989 – January 1990, student, Armed Forces Staff College, Norfolk, Va.
14. March 1990 – July 1993, assistant operations officer, 19th Tactical Fighter Squadron; wing chief of standardization and evaluation, and chief of wing weapons and safety, Operation Desert Storm, 363rd Fighter Wing; and Commander, 33d Fighter Squadron, Shaw AFB, S.C.
15. August 1993 – June 1994, student, Industrial College of the Armed Forces, Fort Lesley J. McNair, Washington, D.C.
16. July 1994 – August 1996, commander of 35th Operations Group, Misawa AB, Japan
17. August 1996 – August 1997, chief of Joint Requirements Division and deputy director of joint matters, Headquarters U.S. Air Force, The Pentagon, Washington, D.C.
18. August 1997 – May 1999, executive assistant to the director, the Joint Staff, the Pentagon, Washington, D.C.
19. May 1999 – May 2000, commander of 8th Fighter Wing, Kunsan AB, South Korea
20. August 2000 – April 2002, commander of 18th Wing, Kadena AB, Japan
21. April 2002 – June 2004, deputy director of politico-military affairs for Asia-Pacific, Joint Staff, the Pentagon, Washington, D.C.
22. July 2004 – January 2006, director for operations, U.S. Pacific Command, Camp H.M. Smith, Hawaii
23. February 2006 – August 2009, commander of 9th Air Force and U.S. Air Forces Central, Shaw AFB, S.C.
24. August 2009 – August 2012, commander of Pacific Air Forces; air component commander for U.S. Pacific Command; and executive director of Pacific Air Combat Operations Staff, Hickam AFB, Hawaii

== Summary of joint assignments ==
1. August 1990 – August 1992, Desert Shield/Desert Storm Planner, Joint Credit, as a lieutenant colonel
2. September 1997 – May 1999, executive officer to the director, Joint Staff, as a colonel
3. April 2002 – June 2004, deputy director of politico-military affairs for Asia-Pacific (J5), Joint Staff, the Pentagon, Washington, D.C., as a brigadier general
4. July 2004 – January 2006, director of operations (J3) US Pacific Command, as a major general

== Flight information ==
- Rating: Command pilot
- Flight hours: More than 4,500
- Aircraft flown: F-4, F-15 and F-16

== Major awards and decorations ==
Command Pilot badge
Office of the Joint Chiefs of Staff Identification Badge
Headquarters Air Force Badge

Defense Distinguished Service Medal
Air Force Distinguished Service Medal
Defense Superior Service Medal with two oak leaf clusters
Legion of Merit with oak leaf cluster
Distinguished Flying Cross with valor device and oak leaf cluster
Bronze Star
Meritorious Service Medal with oak leaf cluster
Air Medal with silver oak leaf cluster
Aerial Achievement Medal with two oak leaf clusters
Air Force Commendation Medal with two oak leaf clusters
Air Force Achievement Medal
Joint Meritorious Unit Award with four oak leaf clusters
Air Force Outstanding Unit Award with "V" device and two silver oak leaf clusters
Air Force Organizational Excellence Award with two oak leaf clusters
Combat Readiness Medal with silver oak leaf cluster
Air Force Recognition Ribbon
National Defense Service Medal with one bronze service star
Southwest Asia Service Medal with three bronze campaign stars
Afghanistan Campaign Medal with two campaign stars
Iraq Campaign Medal with one campaign star
Global War on Terrorism Expeditionary Medal
Global War on Terrorism Service Medal
Korea Defense Service Medal
Humanitarian Service Medal
Air Force Overseas Short Tour Service Ribbon with three bronze oak leaf clusters
Air Force Overseas Long Tour Service Ribbon with four bronze oak leaf clusters
Air Force Expeditionary Service Ribbon with gold frame
Air Force Longevity Service Award with one silver and three bronze oak leaf clusters
Small Arms Expert Marksmanship Ribbon
Air Force Training Ribbon
Kuwait Liberation Medal (Saudi Arabia)
Kuwait Liberation Medal (Kuwait)

- 1993 Lance P. Sijan U.S. Air Force Leadership Award
- 2011 Order of the Sword

== Promotion Dates ==
- Second Lieutenant September 4, 1976
- First Lieutenant September 4, 1978
- Captain September 4, 1980
- Major March 1, 1987
- Lieutenant Colonel April 1, 1990
- Colonel February 1, 1995
- Brigadier General August 1, 2001
- Major General June 1, 2005
- Lieutenant General February 16, 2006
- General August 19, 2009
