= Charles B. Stone III =

United States Air Force general

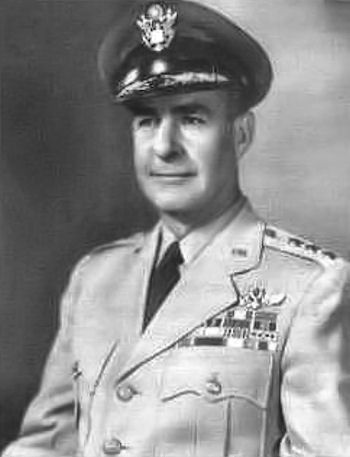
- Lieutenant General Charles B. Stone III.
- Born: March 28, 1904; Fort McPherson, Georgia
- Died: May 17, 1992 (aged 88); Tucson, Arizona
- Burial place: United States Air Force Academy, Colorado
- Military career
- Allegiance: United States
- Branch: United States Army Air Forces; United States Air Force
- Service years: 1927–1957
- Rank: Lieutenant General

- Conflicts: World War II

Lieutenant General Charles Bertody Stone III (March 28, 1904 – May 17, 1992) was an officer in the US Air Force. During World War II, he served as Chief of Staff, Headquarters Army Air Forces, China-Burma-India Theater. During the Cold War, he served as Commander, Continental Air Command, Mitchel Field, New York between 1955–1957.

== Biography ==
He was born in Fort McPherson, Georgia, on March 28, 1904.

=== Early career ===
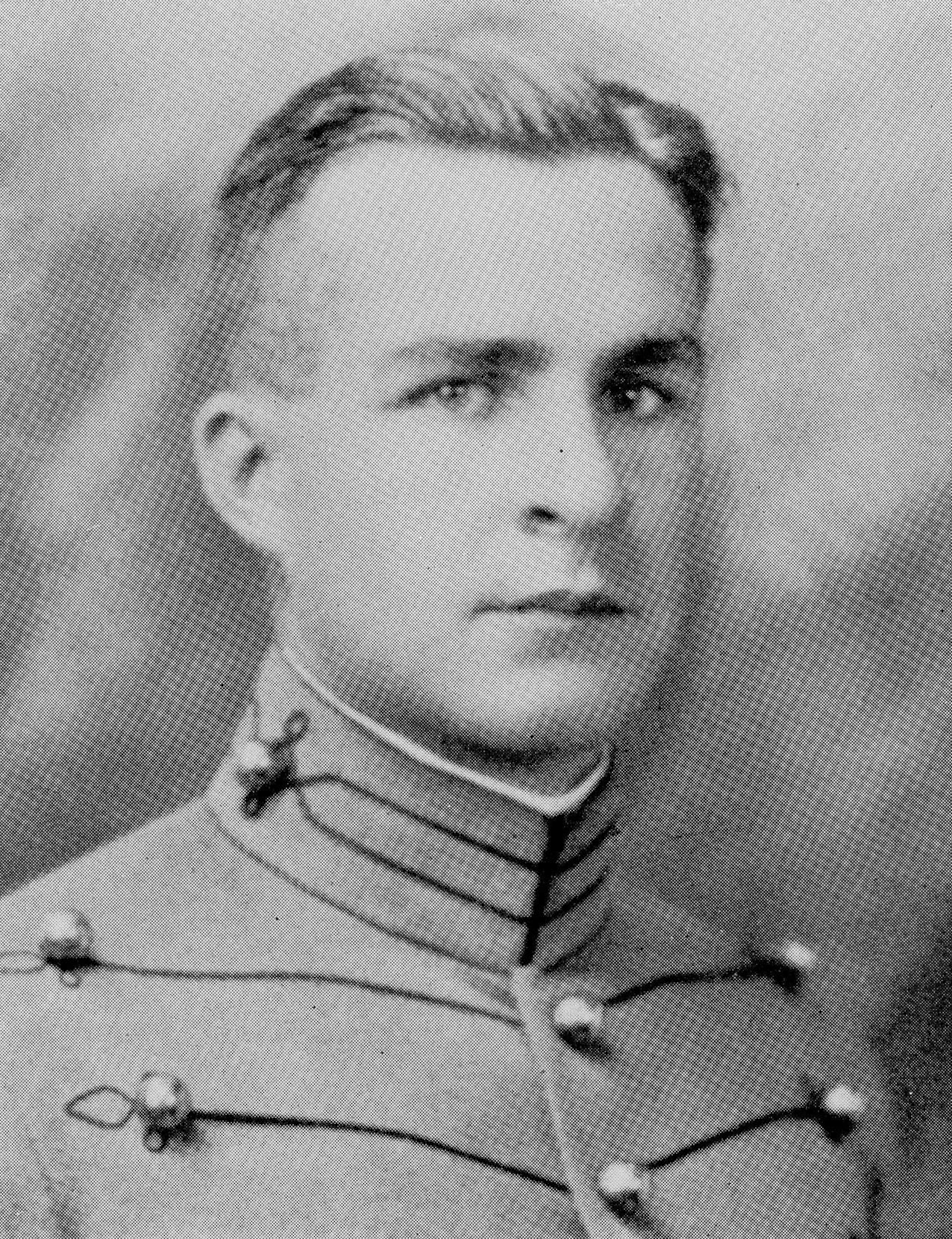
At West Point on 1927

General Stone was appointed to the U.S. Military Academy from Vermont, graduating on June 14, 1927, and was commissioned a second lieutenant of Infantry.

In September 1927, General Stone was assigned with the 9th Infantry at Fort Sam Houston, Texas. Entering the Primary Flying School at Brooks Field, Texas, in March 1929, he graduated from the Advanced Flying School at Kelly Field, Texas, a year later and was then assigned with the 11th Bomb Squadron at Rockwell Field, California. Entering the Air Corps Technical School at Chanute Field, Illinois, in September 1931, he graduated the following June and remained there as assistant to the director, Department of Mechanics.

Assigned with the 64th Service Squadron at March Field, California, in September 1932, and the following month, General Stone joined the 31st Bomb Squadron there. A year later, he became post operations and engineering officer at Hamilton Field, California. From February to May 1934, he was an air mail pilot at Oakland, California, and then joined the 70th Service Squadron at Hamilton Field, assuming command of it in July 1936. General Stone was named engineering officer of the 7th Bomb Group there in October 1936.

Going to Luke Field, Hawaii, in July 1937, General Stone was station and group engineering officer and later became post and group material officer. Transferred to Wright Field, Ohio, in July 1939, he became a unit chief in the Field Service Section.

Entering the Air Corps Tactical School at Field, Alabama, in April 1940, General Stone graduated the following June and returned to Wright Field as chief of the supply branch, Air Service Command, after which he was assigned with the Maintenance and Supply Division in the Office of the Assistant Chief of Air Staff at Air Corps headquarters, Washington, D.C.

=== World War II ===
Ordered to the China-Burma-India Theater in August 1943, General Stone was appointed chief of staff for the Eastern Air Command there the following January. In June 1945, he was sent to China to organize new headquarters for the 14th Air Force Flying Tigers, assuming command of it two months later. Upon its deactivation that December, General Stone was ordered back to Washington for temporary duty with the U.S. Strategic Bombing Survey.

=== Cold War ===
Joining the Air Defense Command in February 1946, General Stone assumed command of the 2nd Air Force at Colorado Springs, Colorado. The following month he was named deputy commander and chief of staff (relieved of latter duty on September 1, 1947) of the Air Defense Command at Wright-Patterson Air Force Base, Ohio, on October 6, 1947, he became director of maintenance, supply and services, and in December 1950 was appointed assistant to the commander.

The following month, General Stone moved to Air Force headquarters, Washington, D.C. as director of maintenance, supply & services in the Office of the Deputy Chief of Staff for Materiel. In April 1951, he was designated assistant for materiel program control to the Deputy Chief of Staff for Materiel. Named special assistant to the Deputy Chief of Staff, Comptroller in July 1951, later that month General Stone became deputy chief of staff, Comptroller, U.S. Air Force headquarters.

Moving to Continental Air Command, Mitchel Air Force Base, New York, on December 15, 1955, General Stone became commander and on April 1, 1956, was assigned additional duty as senior Air Force member, Military Staff Committee, United Nations. On July 2, 1956, he also became chairman, U.S. delegate, United Nations Military Staff Committee.

Stone retired on June 30, 1957, and died on May 17, 1992, in Tucson, Arizona. He was interred at the United States Air Force Academy Cemetery on May 22, 1992.

== Decorations and awards ==
His decorations include the Distinguished Service Medal with oak leaf cluster, Legion of Merit, Distinguished Flying Cross, Bronze Star with oak leaf cluster, British Order of the Bath (Companion), Chinese Tasheu Cloud Banner Medal and Lo Shu decoration. He is rated a command pilot and aircraft observer.

President of the Harvard Business School Club of Washington, D.C., in 1953 and 1954, and a member of the executive council of the Harvard Business School Association from July 1955 to July 1958, General Stone has been a director of the Air Force Aid Society, and appointed chairman of the board of the 14th Air Force Association from 1954 to 1957.

== Promotions ==
- 1942-01-05 Lieutenant-Colonel
- 1943-09-22 Colonel
- 1943-11-11 Brigadier-General
- 1945-03-20 Major-General

== Assignments ==
- 1941-12-13 – 1942-10-20 Chief of Supply Branch, Field Service Section, Air Corps Material Division
- 1942-10-21 – 1942-12-15 Executive for Supply, Field Service Section, Air Corps Material Division
- 1942-12-15 – 1943-02-XX Chief of Accessories Section, Maintenance Division, Air Service Command
- 1943-02-10 – 1943-08-09 Chief of Maintenance & Supply Division, Headquarters US Army Air Forces
- 1943-08-23 – 1945-08-09 Chief of Staff, Eastern Air Command, China-Burma-India Theater of Operations
- 1945-08-10 – 1945-11-29 Commanding General 14th Air Force [China]
- 1945-11-30 – 1946-01-14 Special duty with the Strategic Bombing Survey, US Army Air Forces in the China
- 1946-02-21 – 1946-03-18 Commanding General 2nd Air Force
- 1946-03-XX – 1947-10-XX Deputy Commanding General Air Defense Command
- 1946-03-XX – 1947-10-XX Chief of Staff, Air Defense Command
- 1947-10-14 – 1951-01-XX Director of Supply & Maintenance, Air Material Command
- 1951-01-18 – 1951-07-08 Director of Maintenance, Supply & Services, Office of the Deputy Chief of Staff for Material, Headquarters US Air Force
- 1951-07-09 – 1951-07-27 Special Assistant to Deputy Chief of Staff, Comptroller, Headquarters US Air Force
- 1951-07-28 – 1955-12-14 Deputy Chief of Staff, Comptroller, Headquarters US Air Force
- 1955-12-15 – 1957-06-30 Commanding General Continental Air Command
- 1956-04-01 – 1957-06-30 Senior Air Force Representative to the United Nations Military Staff Committee
- 1956-07-02 – 1957-06-30 Chairman of the US Delegation to the United Nations Military Staff Committee
- 1957-06-30 Retired

== Family ==
Stone was born into a military family. His maternal grandfather was Charles H. Bonesteel Sr. (USMA Class of 1876), his uncle was Charles H. Bonesteel Jr. (USMA Class of 1908) and one of his cousins was Charles H. Bonesteel III (USMA Class of 1931). His father Charles B. Stone Jr. (1879–1934), brother John N. Stone (USMA Class of 1929), brother David B. Stone (USMA Class of 1935) and son Charles B. Stone IV (USMA Class of 1957) were all colonels. His youngest brother Andrew H. Stone also served in the U.S. Army. John's son Thomas E. Stone (USNA Class of 1962) was a U.S. Navy rear admiral. His brother David was later elected to the Arizona House of Representatives, serving from 1967 to 1972.
