= Allied Commission =

Post-World War II group responsible for administering defeated Axis territories

Following the termination of hostilities in World War II, the Allies were in control of the defeated Axis countries. Anticipating the defeat of Germany, Italy and Japan, they had already set up the European Advisory Commission and a proposed Far Eastern Advisory Commission to make recommendations for the post-war period. Accordingly, they managed their control of the defeated countries through Allied Commissions, often referred to as Allied Control Commissions (ACC), consisting of representatives of the major Allies.

== Italy ==
Under the provisions of Article 37 in the Armistice with Italy Instrument of Surrender, September 29, 1943, the Control Commission for Italy was established on November 10, 1943, and was dismantled on December 14, 1947, following the conclusion of the Italian Peace Treaty at the Paris Peace Conference in 1947.

Chief Commissioners: General Noel Mason-MacFarlane, then Harold Macmillan

== Romania ==
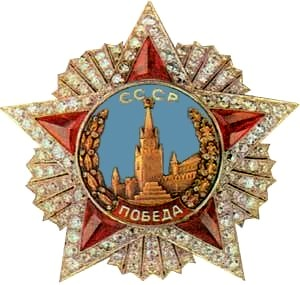
King Michael I of Romania was awarded the Order of Victory (the highest Soviet order) for overthrowing the pro-German Marshal Antonescu in the August 23 coup.

The Armistice Agreement with Rumania, signed on September 12, 1944, established, among others, the following:

- Article 1 "As from August 24, 1944, at four a.m., Rumania has entirely discontinued military operations against the Union of Soviet Socialist Republics on all theaters of war, has withdrawn from the war against the United Nations, has broken off relations with Germany and her satellites, has entered the war and will wage war on the side of the Allied Powers against Germany and Hungary for the purpose of restoring Rumanian independence and sovereignty, for which purpose she provides not less than twelve infantry divisions with corps troops."
- Article 4 "The state frontier between the Union of Soviet Socialist Republics and Rumania, established by the Soviet-Rumanian Agreement of June 28, 1940, is restored."
- Article 18 "An Allied Control Commission will be established which will undertake until the conclusion of peace the regulation of and control over the execution of the present terms under the general direction and orders of the Allied (Soviet) High Command, acting on behalf of the Allied Powers". In the Annex to Article 18, it was made clear that "The Romanian Government and their organs shall fulfill all instructions of the Allied Control Commission arising out of the Armistice Agreement." and that the Allied Control Commission would have its seat in Bucharest.
- Article 19 "The Allied Governments regard the decision of the Vienna award regarding Transylvania as null and void and are agreed that Transylvania (or the greater part thereof) should be returned to Rumania, subject to confirmation at the peace settlement, and the Soviet Government agrees that Soviet forces shall take part for this purpose in joint military operations with Rumania against Germany and Hungary."

In line with Article 14 of the Armistice Agreement two Romanian People's Tribunals were set up to try suspected war criminals. The Treaty of Peace with Romania was signed on February 10, 1947, and entered into force on September 15, 1947.

The commission, placed under the nominal leadership of Soviet general Rodion Malinovsky (represented by Vladislav Petrovich Vinogradov), was dominated by Red Army leaders.

The commission was one of the tools used by the Soviet Union to impose communist rule in Romania. Soviet occupation forces remained in Romania until 1958 and the country became a satellite state of the Soviet Union, joining the Warsaw Pact and COMECON.

== Finland ==
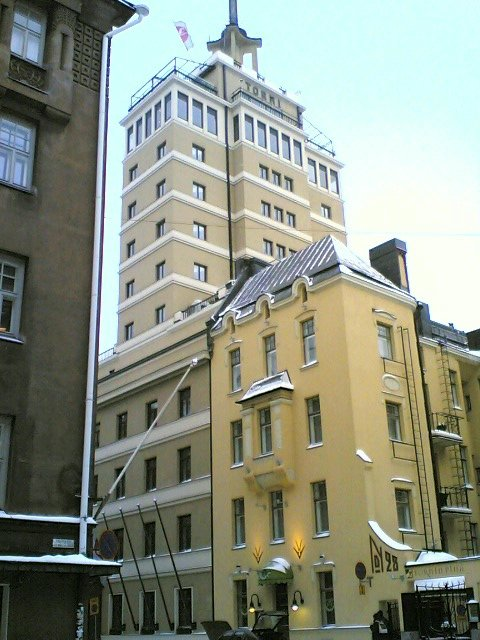
In Helsinki the Allied Control Commission occupied the Hotel Torni.

The Allied Control Commission (ACC) arrived in Finland on September 22, 1944, to observe Finnish compliance with the Moscow Armistice. It consisted of 200 Soviet and 15 British members and was led by Col. Gen. Andrei Zhdanov. As the commission was virtually entirely controlled by the Soviets, it was even officially referred to as the Allied (Soviet) Control Commission (Liittoutuneiden (Neuvostoliiton) valvontakomissio in Finnish). Immediately after its inception, the commission required Finland to take more vigorous action to intern the German forces in Northern Finland. Finland's compliance with the commission resulted in a campaign to force out the remaining German troops in the area. Simultaneously, the commission also required Finland to demobilize.

The ACC provided Finland with a list of political leaders against whom Finland had to start judicial proceedings. This required Finnish ex post facto legislation. The ACC interfered with the war-responsibility trials by requiring longer prison sentences than the preliminary verdict would have contained. The ACC and the Moscow Armistice also required bans on a number of fascist, far-right and anti-Soviet organizations, among them the Civil Guard and Lotta Svärd organizations. Furthermore, the ACC required the forced return of all Soviet citizens, including Ingrian Finns and Estonians, to the Soviet Union.

After the war, the Finnish military placed part of the weapons of the demobilized troops into several hundred caches distributed around the country. The caches would have been used to arm guerillas in case of a Soviet occupation. When the matter was leaked to the public, the commission required Finnish authorities to investigate and prosecute the officers and men responsible for the caching. The Weapons Cache Case was followed closely until the ACC determined that the case was purely a military operation. The Allied Control Commission left Finland September 26, 1947, when the Soviet Union finally ratified the Paris Peace Treaty.

== Bulgaria ==
The Armistice Agreement with Bulgaria was signed on October 28, 1944, and its provisions were:

- Article 1: "On the conclusion of hostilities against Germany the Bulgarian armed forces must be demobilized and put on a peace footing under: supervision of the Allied Control Commission."
- Article 11: property taken from United Nations territory must be returned to those territories under the supervision of the Control Commission.
- Article 13: property belonging to the Axis powers of Germany and Hungary must not be returned without permission of the Control Commission.
- Article 18: the commission would "regulate and supervise the execution of the armistice terms under the chairmanship of the representative of the Allied (Soviet) High Command. ... During the period between the coming into force of the armistice and the conclusion of hostilities against Germany, the Allied Control Commission will be under the general direction of the Allied (Soviet) High Command."

The United States representatives on the Commission for Bulgaria were Major General John A. Crane (October 28, 1944 – March 1, 1946) and Major General Walter M. Robertson (March 1, 1946 – September 10, 1947).

== Hungary ==
The Armistice Agreement with Hungary was concluded on January 20, 1945, and its provisions were:

- Article 1: "On the conclusion of hostilities against Germany, the Hungarian armed forces must be demobilized and put on a peace footing under the supervision of the Allied Control Commission.
- Article 2: Hungary has accepted the obligation to evacuate all Hungarian troops and officials from the territory of Czechoslovakia, Yugoslavia, and Rumania occupied by her within the limits of the frontiers of Hungary existing on December 31, 1937, and also to repeal all legislative and administrative provisions relating to the annexation or incorporation into Hungary of Czechoslovak, Yugoslav and Rumanian territory.
- Article 6: property taken from United Nations territory must be returned to those territories under the supervision of the Control Commission.
- Article 8: property belonging to the Axis power of Germany must not be returned without permission of the Control Commission.
- Article 11: Hungary should pay for the Allied Control Commission and that "The Government of Hungary will also assure, in case of need, the use and regulation of the work of industrial and transport enterprises, means of communication, power stations, enterprises and installations of public utility, stores of fuel and other material, in accordance with instructions issued during the armistice by the Allied (Soviet) High Command or the Allied Control Commission."
- Article 17: "Hungarian administrative bodies undertaking to carry out, in the interests of the reestablishment of peace and security, instructions and orders of the Allied (Soviet) High Command or Allied Control Commission issued by them for the purpose of securing the execution of these armistice terms."
- Article 18: "For the whole period of the armistice there will be established in Hungary an Allied Control Commission which will regulate and supervise the execution of the armistice terms under the chairmanship of the representative of the Allied ( Soviet ) High Command ... During the period between the coming into force of the armistice and the conclusion of hostilities against Germany, the Allied Control Commission will be under the general direction of the Allied (Soviet) High Command."

The United States representatives on the Commission for Hungary were Major General William S. Key (January 20, 1945 – July 4, 1946) and Brigadier General George H. Weems (July 5, 1946 – September 15, 1947).

== Germany ==
The Allied Control Council (ACC) for Germany oversaw the Allied Occupation Zones in Germany. The ACC was established by agreement of June 5, 1945, supplemented by agreement of September 20 of that same year, with its seat in Berlin. Its members were Great Britain, France, the Soviet Union, and the United States of America. Decisions could only be made by consensus. From the outset; proceedings were heavily compromised through systematic non-cooperation from the French representatives. The French had been excluded (at American insistence) from the Potsdam Conference and consequently refused to recognise any obligation for the ACC to be constrained by the Potsdam Agreement. In particular, they resisted all proposals to establish common policies and institutions across Germany as a whole, and anything that they feared might lead to the emergence of an eventual unified German government. Cooperation within the ACC finally broke down completely when the Soviet representative withdrew on March 20, 1948. Until 1971, the ACC did not meet again, and the stage was set for the partition of Germany into two states.

After the breakdown of the ACC, the British, French and United States of America occupation zones and the British, French and United States of America sectors in Berlin were governed by the Allied High Commission with membership from Britain, France, and the United States, whilst the Soviet Zone and Soviet sector of Berlin were governed by the Chairman of the Soviet Control Commission, later the Soviet High Commissioner. The role of the High Commissioners ceased when the three western zones (other than Berlin) and the Soviet Zone (other than in Berlin) acquired de facto sovereignty as respectively the Federal Republic of Germany ('West Germany') and the German Democratic Republic ('East Germany') (subject to certain restrictions).

The ACC convened again in 1971, leading to agreement on transit arrangements in Berlin. During the talks for unification of Germany in late 1989, it was decided to convene the ACC again as a forum for solving the issue of Allied rights and privileges in Germany. The disbanding of the ACC was officially announced by the Two Plus Four Agreement of September 12, 1990, effective as of March 15, 1991. The ACC last met on 2 October 1990, on the eve of German Reunification.

== Austria ==
The creation of an Allied Commission for Austria was envisaged by Allied leaders at the various sessions of the European Advisory Commission in 1944. The matter became more pressing following the Soviet takeover of Vienna from German control on April 13, 1945. The Soviet authorities in Vienna decided to establish a new Austrian government without prior consultation with the other Allied leaders, and on April 27, the Austrian socialist leader Karl Renner formed a government in Vienna. The British, US and French governments refused at first to recognize the Renner government, and in order to undermine the Soviet move decided to start right away with the proceedings to establish a joint commission for Austria. However, the Soviet government withheld permission for Allied representatives to enter Vienna during late April to early May, arguing that agreement on partition of Vienna into four occupation zones must be done prior to the arrival of any other troops thereto. As a result, it was only on June 4 that a delegation of US, British and French generals was able to arrive at Vienna to survey conditions in the area. However, not much progress was made throughout June, as the Soviet authorities restricted the movement of the western Allies in and around Vienna. Throughout June, negotiations for agreement on division of Austria into occupation zones were held in London within the European Advisory Commission, and the agreement was concluded on July 4, 1945, subject to further approval. The agreement was then approved by the four Allied governments. On July 12, it was approved by the British and French governments. On July 21, the Soviet government gave its approval, and the US government followed suit on July 24. On June 27, 1945, shortly prior to the formation of the Allied Commission for Austria, the US Joint Chiefs of Staff issued an ordinance authorizing General Mark W. Clark as Commander in Chief of US Forces of Occupation in Austria. Regarding the future commission for Austria, the directive stated:

As such you will serve as United States member of the Allied Council of the Allied Commission for Austria and will also be responsible for the administration of military government in the zone or zones assigned to the United States for purposes of occupation and administration.

The Allied Commission for Austria was established by the Agreement on Control Machinery in Austria, signed in the European Advisory Commission in London on July 4, 1945. It entered into force on July 24, 1945, on the day that the United States gave notification of approval, the last of the four powers to do so. It was supplemented by an agreement of June 28, 1946, which enabled the Austrian government to conduct foreign relations.

A separate agreement for the division of the city of Vienna into four occupation zones was concluded on July 9, 1945. This agreement was approved by the British government on July 12, the French government on July 16, the Soviet government on July 21 and the US government on July 24.

Austria was divided into four zones: American, British, French and Soviet. Vienna, being the capital, was similarly divided but at its centre was an International Zone, sovereignty of which alternated at regular intervals between the four powers. The commission had its seat in Vienna.

A problem faced by the commission was the issue of the provisional government under Karl Renner, which was established unilaterally by the Soviet government in early May 1945. The other Allied governments refused at first to recognize it, but on October 1, 1945, the commission made the following recommendation:

The Council examined the question of the Provisional Austrian Government and are making recommendations to their respective governments. The Council decided on the reestablishment of a free press in the whole of Austria subject only to conditions of military security. They also decided that effective December 1 the wearing of military uniforms unless dyed a color other than grey or khaki is forbidden to former personnel of the German Army and to Austrian civilians.

The commission recommended the recognition of Renner's government in exchange for the introduction of freedom of the press and the holding of free elections.

The commission for Austria was dismantled following the conclusion of the Austrian State Treaty on May 15, 1955.

== Japan ==
It was agreed at the Moscow Conference of Foreign Ministers, and made public in communique issued at the end of the conference on December 27, 1945, that the Far Eastern Advisory Commission (FEAC) would become the Far Eastern Commission (FEC), it would be based in Washington, and would oversee the Allied Council for Japan. This arrangement was similar to those that the Allies had set up for overseeing the defeated Axis powers in Europe. In a mirror image of those Axis countries, like Hungary, which fell to the Soviet Union and were occupied by the Red Army alone, Japan having fallen to the United States and occupied by the U.S. Army, the United States was given the dominant position on the Tokyo-based Allied Council for Japan. The change in name of the FEAC to FEC was significant because as the U.S. Secretary of State James F. Byrnes reported after the Conference "as early as August 9 we invited the Soviet Union, Great Britain, and China to join with us in carrying out the objectives of the Potsdam Declaration and the Terms of Surrender for Japan. The Far Eastern Advisory Commission was established in October, but Great Britain had reservations regarding its advisory character, and the Soviet Union requested a decision regarding control machinery in Tokyo before joining the work of the commission". As agreed in the communique the FEC and the Allied Council were dismantled following the Treaty of San Francisco on September 8, 1951.

== See also ==
- Petersberg agreement
- Allied Military Government of Occupied Territories
- Potsdam Agreement (1945)
- Moscow Conference of Foreign Ministers (1945)
- Paris Peace Treaties, 1947
