= Leven Cooper Allen =

American army officer (1894–1979)

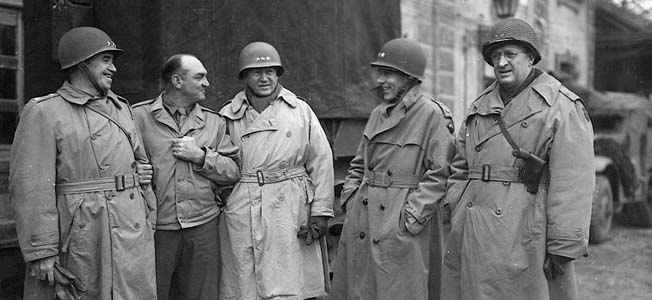
- From left to right: Lieutenant General Omar Bradley, Major General John S. Wood, Lieutenant General George S. Patton, Major General Leven C. Allen and Major General Manton S. Eddy.
- Born: March 29, 1894; Fort Douglas, Utah, U.S.
- Died: September 27, 1979 (aged 85); Washington, D.C., U.S.
- Burial place: West Point Cemetery, West Point, New York, United States
- Military career
- Allegiance: United States
- Branch: United States Army
- Service years: 1916–1951
- Rank: Major General
- Service number: 0-4760
- Unit: Infantry Branch
- Commands: United States Army Infantry School
- Conflicts: World War I World War II; Korean War
- Awards: Distinguished Service Medal (3); Legion of Merit (2); Bronze Star Medal; Purple Heart; Air Medal

Major General Leven Cooper Allen (March 29, 1894 – September 27, 1979) was an officer in the United States Army during World War II.

== Early life ==
Leven Cooper Allen was born on March 29, 1894, in Fort Douglas, Utah. Before his military service, he attended the University of San Francisco from 1912 to 1916.

== Military career ==
Allen was commissioned in 1916 and was stationed in France. He graduated from the Command and General Staff School in 1931 and the Army War College in 1935. Allen served in the General Staff of the War Department from May, 1941 to February, 1942. Following serving in the General Staff, he held the position of commandant at the Infantry School until October, 1943. During 1942, Allen served as brigadier general and major general. From 1943 to 1945, he served as chief of staff of the 12th Army Group (formerly the First Army Group). For his actions during World War II, Allen was given two Army Distinguished Service Medals.

His wartime promotion to major general was made permanent on January 23, 1948. His last assignment before his December 31, 1951 retirement was as chief of staff of the 8th Army in Korea.

== Later life ==
Allen lived in Washington, D.C. after retirement and died at Walter Reed Army Hospital on September 27, 1979. He is buried at the United States Military Academy Post Cemetery.

== Honors and awards ==
Allen was the recipient of the Distinguished Service Medal with two Bronze Oak Leaf Clusters, the Legion of Merit with one Bronze Oak Leaf Cluster, the Bronze Star Medal, the Purple Heart and the Air Medal.

== Family ==
Allen married Helen Townsley, the daughter of General Clarence P. Townsley, on April 11, 1928 in Washington, D.C. His older brother Lt. Col. Gilbert M. Allen was the best man and Helen's older sister Marian was the maid of honor. They had a daughter and two grandchildren.

Military offices
Preceded by Omar Bradley	Commandant of the United States Army Infantry School; 1942–1943	Succeeded by Charles H. Bonesteel
