= Attorney General Stone (disambiguation) =

Harlan F. Stone (1872–1946) was an attorney general of the United States.

Attorney General Stone may also refer to:

- George Frederick Stone (1812–1875), Attorney General of Western Australia
- Shane Stone (born 1950), Attorney-General of the Northern Territory
- William Stone (attorney) (1842–1897), Attorney General of South Carolina
