= Charles H. Bonesteel III =

United States Army general (1909–1977)

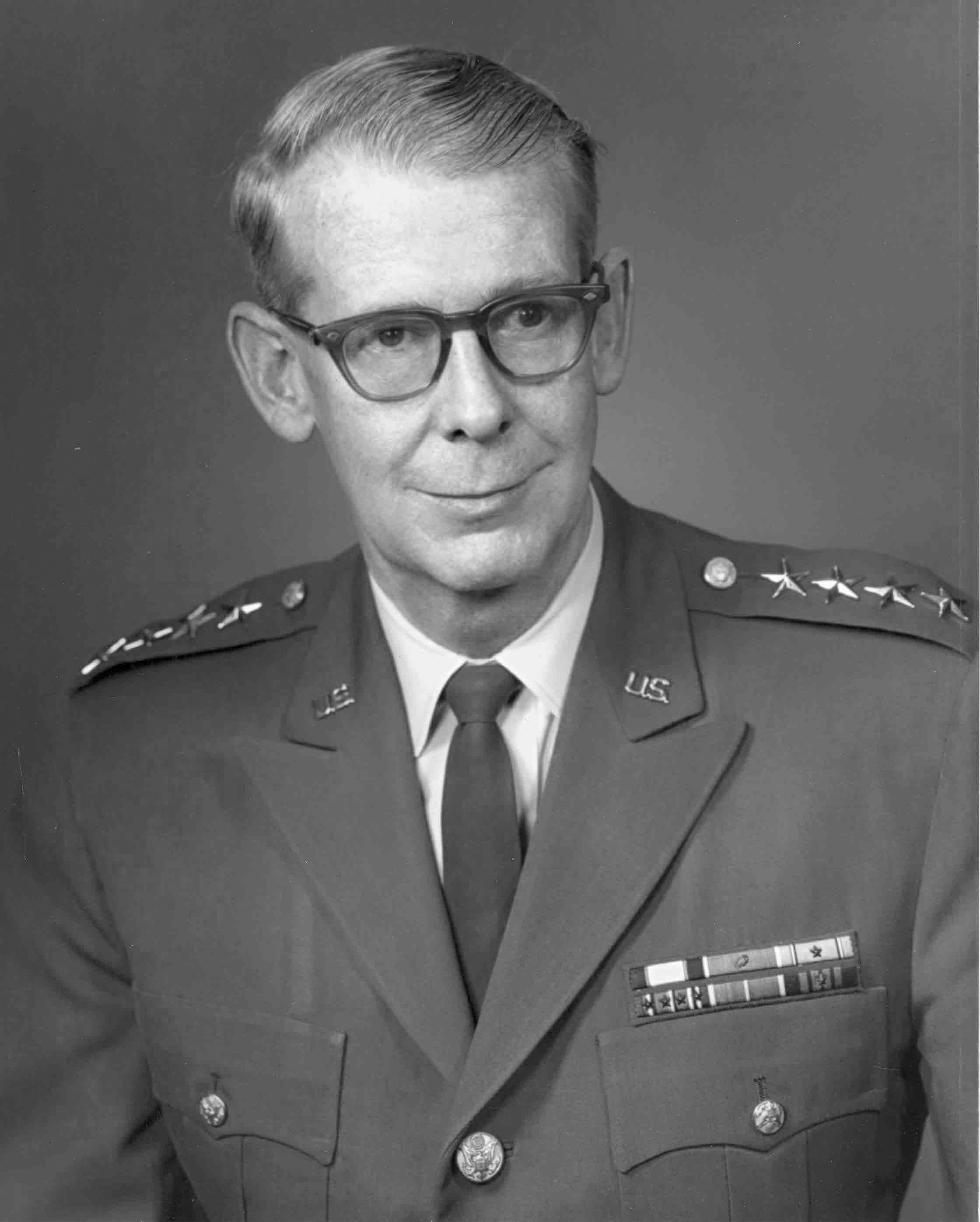
- Born: Charles Hartwell Bonesteel III; 26 September 1909; Plattsburgh, New York, United States
- Died: 13 October 1977 (aged 68); Alexandria, Virginia, United States
- Burial place: Arlington National Cemetery
- Relatives: Major General Charles Hartwell Bonesteel Jr. (father)
- Military career
- Allegiance: United States
- Branch: United States Army
- Service years: 1931–1969
- Rank: General
- Nickname: "Tick"
- Commands: 24th Infantry Division; VII Corps; Eighth United States Army; United States Forces Korea; United Nations Command Korea (CINC USFK/UNC)
- Conflicts: World War II; Korean DMZ Conflict
- Awards: Distinguished Service Medal (2); Legion of Merit (2)

Charles Hartwell Bonesteel III (Note: Pronounced /ˌbɒnəˈstɛl/ BON-ə-STEL.) (26 September 1909 – 13 October 1977) was an American military commander, the son of Major General Charles Hartwell Bonesteel Jr. and grandson of Major Charles H. Bonesteel Sr. (1851–1902). He served in the United States Army during World War II and the Korean War and the Vietnam War. In the 1960s, he served as commander, United States Forces Korea during the Korean DMZ Conflict (1966–69).

== Early life and education ==
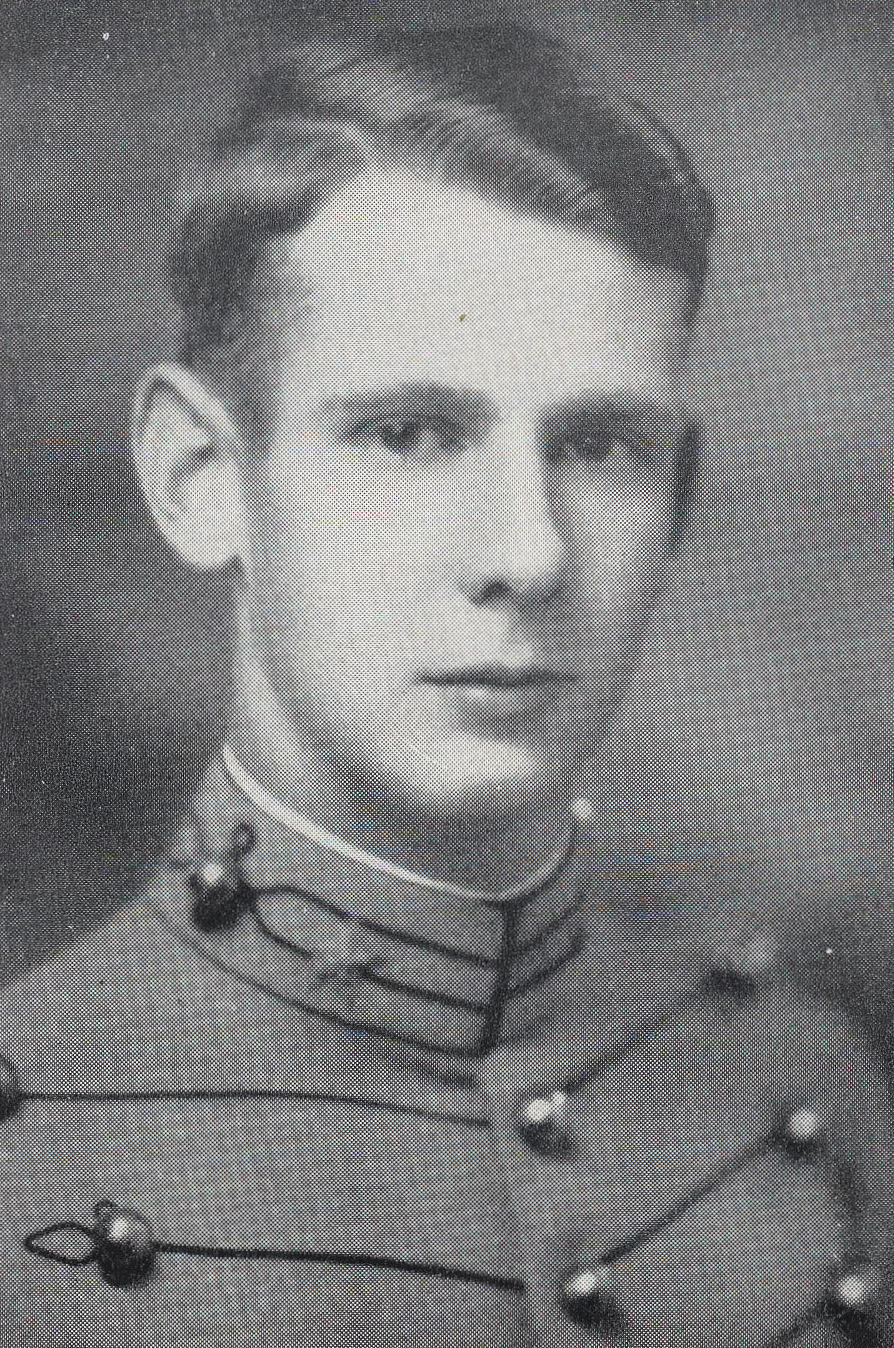
Bonesteel as a United States Military Academy cadet c. 1931

Bonesteel was born on 26 September 1909, in Plattsburgh, New York. As a teenager, he was an Eagle Scout and was awarded the Distinguished Eagle Scout Award by the Boy Scouts of America.

== Career ==
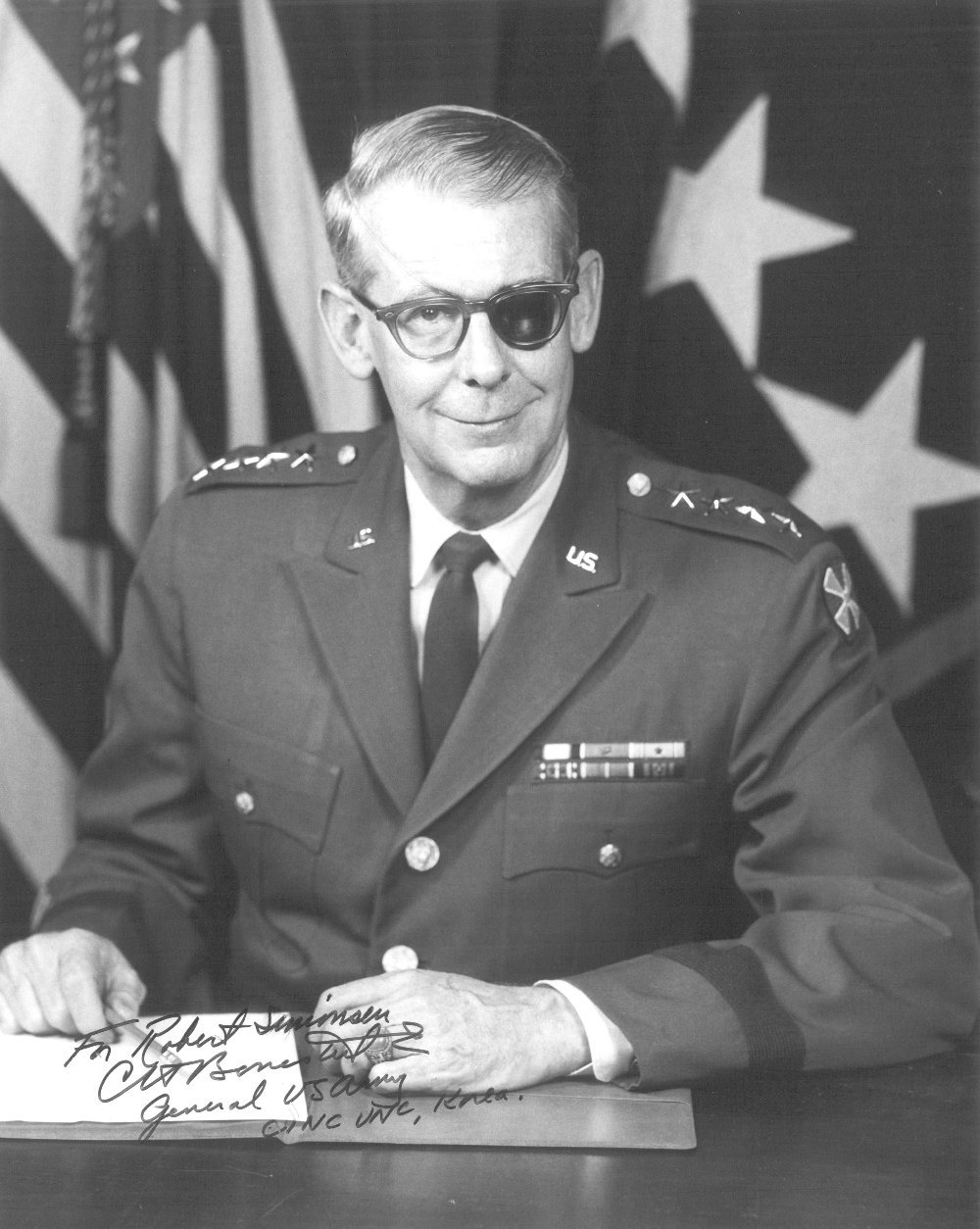
Bonesteel with his "eyepatch", an opaque lens behind his eyeglasses which was required after surgery for a detached retina.

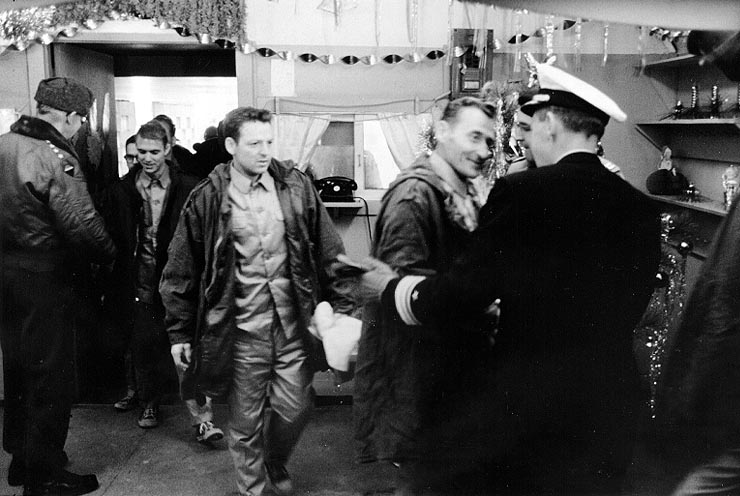
Bonesteel, welcoming the crew of USS Pueblo following the Pueblo incident.

A 1931 graduate of the United States Military Academy at West Point, his classmates who also became general officers included John P. Daley. While at West Point, Bonesteel received from his classmates the lifelong nickname of "Tick." After graduation, he was a Rhodes Scholar at the University of Oxford.

After carrying out a series of command and staff assignments, he served in the United States and Europe during World War II in a number of senior positions. With the surrender of Japan imminent, Bonesteel, General George A. Lincoln, and Colonel Dean Rusk of the Strategy Policy Committee at the Pentagon were tasked with drawing up General Order No. 1 to define the areas of responsibility for American, Soviet and Chinese forces. On 10 August 1945, with Soviet forces already moving through Manchuria into northern Korea, Bonesteel proposed the 38th parallel as the Division of Korea. The draft General Order was cabled to the Soviets on 15 August and accepted by them the following day.

In the postwar era, Bonesteel served as special assistant to the Secretary of State. In November 1958, in an official capacity, he visited Saigon, South Vietnam. He also served as commanding general of the 24th Infantry Division (1961–1962), and commanding general of the VII Corps (1962–1963).

Bonesteel served as the Commander of U.S. Forces Korea (and Commander-in-Chief, U.N. Command Korea; Commanding General, Eighth U.S. Army) from 1966 to 1969. During this period he defended against North Korean infiltration during the Korean DMZ Conflict (1966–1969) and dealt with tensions arising from the January 1968 Pueblo incident.

== Later life, death and funeral ==
Bonesteel retired from the U.S. Army in 1969, died on 13 October 1977, and is buried in Arlington National Cemetery near his father and grandfather.

== Awards and decorations ==
- Distinguished Service Medal, twice (General Staff War Department, 1944–45; retirement, 1969)
- Legion of Merit, twice (Sicily, 1943; European Theater, 1943–44)
- Honorary Officer of the Order of the British Empire (United Kingdom)
- Croix de Guerre (France)
- Distinguished Eagle Scout Award
