= Thomas Sheppard (cricketer) =

English cricketer

Personal information
- Full name: Thomas Winter Sheppard
- Born: 4 March 1873; Emsworth, Hampshire, England
- Died: 7 June 1954 (aged 81); Callander, Perthshire, Scotland
- Batting: Right-handed
- Relatives: David Sheppard (great-nephew)

Domestic team information
- Years: Team
- 1905: Hampshire
- 1909: Worcestershire

Career statistics
| Competition | First-class |
|---|---|
| Matches | 2 |
| Runs scored | 53 |
| Batting average | 17.66 |
| 100s/50s | –/– |
| Top score | 22 |
| Catches/stumpings | –/– |
- Source: Cricinfo, 9 September 2007

Thomas Winter Sheppard DL JP (4 March 1873 — 7 June 1954) was an English first-class cricketer and British Army officer.

The son of Major Thomas Winter Sheppard, he was born at Emsworth in March 1873. His father died before his birth, with his grandfather who was reverend at Emsworth helping to raise him. He was educated at Wellington College, before attending the Royal Military College, Sandhurst. He graduated from there into the Liverpool Regiment as a second lieutenant in February 1893, with promotion to lieutenant following in September 1895. Sheppard served in the Second Boer War with the Mounted Infantry. He was promoted to captain during the war in March 1900, He returned home following the conclusion of the war in June 1902. He was back in a regular commission in his regiment from September 1902.

In 1905, Sheppard made a single appearance in first-class cricket for Hampshire against Yorkshire at Hull in the County Championship; he was dismissed by George Hirst for 17 runs in the match, in which play was only possible on one of the three scheduled days. He played in minor matches for the British Army cricket team, prior to making a second appearance in first-class cricket for Worcestershire against Oxford University at Oxford in 1909. He batted twice in this match, being dismissed for 22 runs in Worcestershire's first innings by Roy Robinson, while in their second innings he was dismissed for 14 runs by Frederick Turner.

In the army, he was made an adjutant in November 1911 and seconded for duty with a Territorial Infantry. He served in the First World War, during which he was promoted to major in October 1914. In September 1915, he was seconded to the General Staff as a staff captain. Following the end of the war, Sheppard was awarded the Croce al Merito di Guerra by the Kingdom of Italy in May 1919. Following the death of his uncle, The Reverend Henry Alexander Graham Sheppard in September 1919, Sheppard inherited from him the Duchray and Rednock Estates in Scotland. Upon assuming his inheritance, he changed his name to Thomas Winter Sheppard-Graham. His military career came to an end when he exceeded the age of recall in March 1928, at which point he held the rank of lieutenant colonel.

Sheppard was later appointed deputy lieutenant of Stirlingshire in April 1937, and was a justice of the peace. Sheppard died in June 1954 at Callander, Stirlingshire. He was survived by wife, Margaret, whom he had married in 1905; the couple had three children. He was also the great-uncle of the England Test cricketer and Church of England bishop David Sheppard.
