= Relief of Douglas MacArthur =

Dismissal of a general by Harry S. Truman

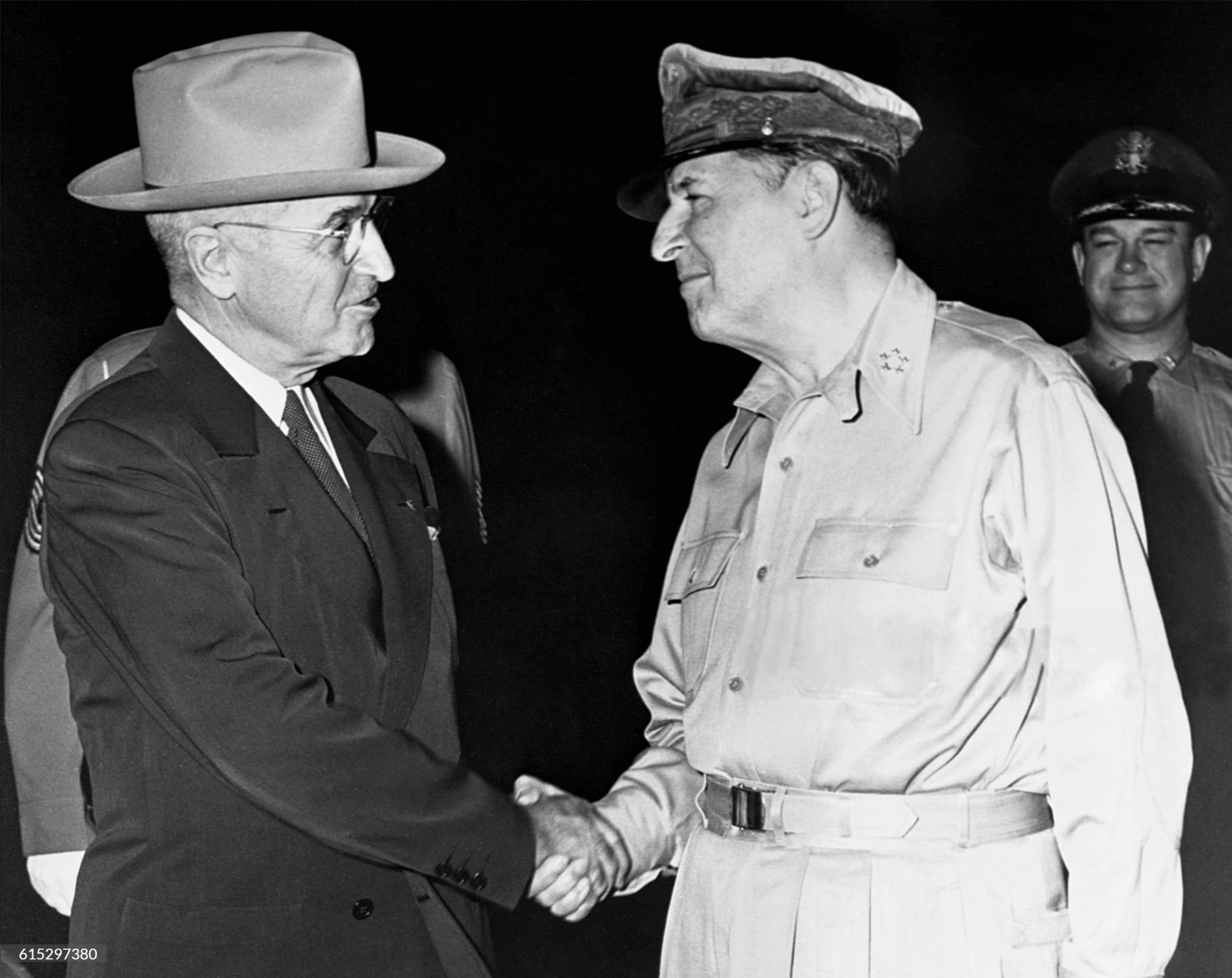
Douglas MacArthur shakes hands with US president Harry Truman at the Wake Island Conference, seven months before being relieved from command.

On 11 April 1951, U.S. president Harry S. Truman relieved General of the Army Douglas MacArthur of his commands after MacArthur made public statements that contradicted the administration's policies. MacArthur was a popular hero of World War II who then was commander of United Nations Command forces fighting in the Korean War, and his relief remains a controversial topic in the field of civil–military relations.

MacArthur led the Allied forces in the Southwest Pacific during World War II, and after the war was in charge of the occupation of Japan. In the latter role, MacArthur was able to accumulate considerable power over the civil administration of Japan.

After North Korea invaded South Korea in June 1950, starting the Korean War, MacArthur was designated commander of the United Nations forces defending South Korea. He conceived and executed the amphibious assault at Inchon on 15 September 1950, but when he followed up his victory with a full-scale invasion of North Korea, China inflicted a series of defeats, compelling him to withdraw from North Korea. By April 1951, the military situation had stabilized, but MacArthur publicly criticized the administration's policies, leading Truman to have MacArthur relieved of his command.

An apolitical military was an American tradition. The principle of civilian control of the military was also ingrained. Civilian control was an issue considering the constitutional division of powers between the president as commander-in-chief, and Congress with its power to raise armies, maintain a navy, and declare war. This was also an era when the rising complexity of military technology led to the creation of a professional military force, and American troops were employed overseas in large numbers.

The Armed Services Committee and the Foreign Relations Committee of the U.S. Senate held a joint inquiry into the military situation and the circumstances surrounding MacArthur's relief, and concluded that "the removal of General MacArthur was within the constitutional powers of the President but the circumstances were a shock to national pride". In having MacArthur relieved for failing to "respect the authority of the President" by privately communicating with Congress, Truman upheld the president's role as preeminent.

== Background ==
=== Harry Truman ===
Harry S. Truman, then the vice president of the United States, became president of the United States on the death of Franklin D. Roosevelt in 1945, and won an unexpected victory to a full term in the 1948 presidential election. He is the only president who has served after 1897 without a college degree. Although not highly educated, Truman was well read. When his high school friends went off to the state university in 1901, he enrolled in a local business school, but only lasted a semester. He later took night courses at the Kansas City Law School, but dropped out. Truman attempted to gain admission to the United States Military Academy at West Point, but was rejected for his poor eyesight. He was proud of his military service in the artillery during World War I, and continued to hold a reserve commission, eventually achieving the rank of colonel.

Instead of professional soldiers, Truman selected two National Guardsmen, Harry H. Vaughan and Louis H. Renfrow, as his military aides. Truman once remarked that he did not understand how the US Army could "produce men such as Robert E. Lee, John J. Pershing, Eisenhower, and Bradley and at the same time produce Custers, Pattons, and MacArthur".

During the 1949 Revolt of the Admirals, several naval officers publicly disagreed with the administration's policy over cuts to naval aviation and amphibious warfare capability, resulting in the relief of the Chief of Naval Operations, Admiral Louis Denfeld, and his replacement by Admiral Forrest Sherman. In testimony before the House Armed Services Committee investigation into the affair in October 1949, the chairman of the Joint Chiefs of Staff, General Omar Bradley, doubted that there would ever be another large-scale amphibious operation.

=== Douglas MacArthur ===
In stature and seniority, General of the Army Douglas MacArthur was the Army's foremost general. The son of Lieutenant General Arthur MacArthur Jr., a recipient of the Medal of Honor for action during the American Civil War, he had graduated at the top of his West Point class of 1903, but never attended an advanced service school except for the engineer course in 1908. He had a distinguished combat record in World War I, and had served as Chief of Staff of the United States Army from 1930 to 1935, working closely with Presidents Herbert Hoover and Franklin Roosevelt, despite occasional clashes over the military budget. He later compared Roosevelt's "extraordinary self-control" with Truman's "violent temper and paroxysms of ungovernable rage".

Apart from his World War I–era service in Mexico and Europe, his overseas postings were in Asia and the Pacific. During World War II, he became a national hero and was awarded the Medal of Honor for the unsuccessful defense of the Philippines in the Battle of Bataan. He commanded the Allied armies in the New Guinea Campaign and Philippines Campaign, fulfilling his famous promise to return to the Philippines. In 1944 and 1948, he was considered a possible Republican candidate for president. After the war, as the Supreme Commander of the Allied Powers, he oversaw the occupation of Japan and played an important part in the post-war political and social transformation of that country.

By 1950, the occupation of Japan was winding down, but MacArthur remained in the country as Commander-in-Chief Far East, a post to which he had been appointed by Truman in 1945. MacArthur had to deal with deep cuts in the defense budget that saw his troop numbers decline from 300,000 in 1947 to 142,000 in 1948. Despite his protests, further reductions followed and, by June 1950, there were only 108,000 troops in his Far East Command. Cuts in funds and personnel produced shortages of serviceable equipment. Of the Far East Command's 18,000 jeeps, 10,000 were unserviceable; of its 13,780 2 1/2-ton 6x6 trucks, only 4,441 were serviceable. On the positive side, Far East Command initiated a program of reclaiming and refurbishing war materiel from abandoned stocks throughout the Pacific. This had not only recovered a great deal of valuable stores and equipment, it had also generated a useful repair and rebuilding industry in Japan. Meanwhile, the shift away from occupation duties had permitted a greater focus on training for combat.

== Events leading up to the relief ==
=== Korean War ===
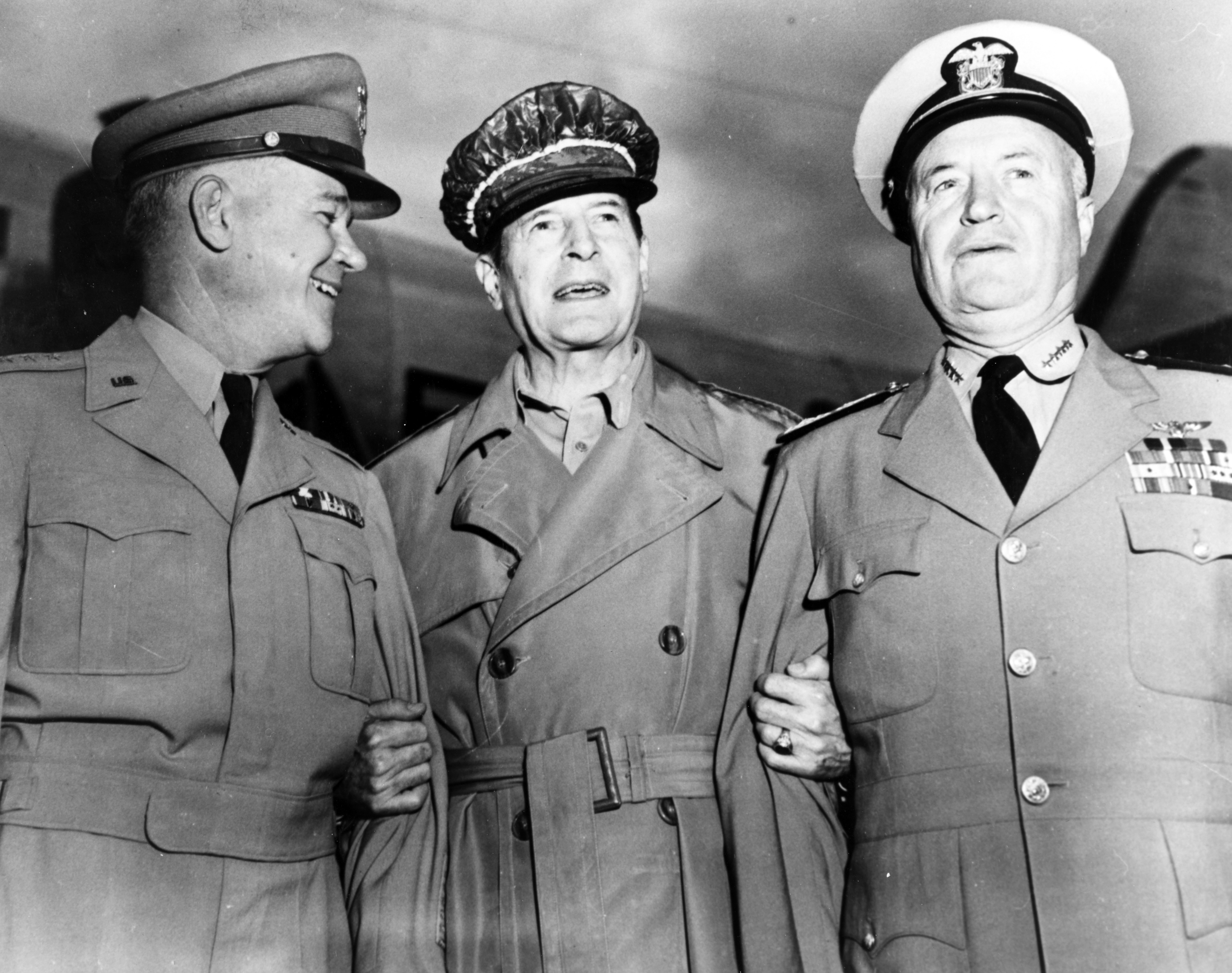
MacArthur (center) with Army Chief of Staff General J. Lawton Collins (left) and Chief of Naval Operations Admiral Forrest Sherman (right)

North Korea invaded South Korea on 25 June 1950, starting the Korean War. In response to an urgent request from the Korean Military Advisory Group for more ammunition, MacArthur, on his own initiative, ordered the transport ship MSTS Sgt. George D Keathley, then in harbor in Yokohama, to be loaded with ammunition and to sail for Pusan. President Truman met with the Joint Chiefs of Staff and other advisors that day at Blair House, his temporary residence during the White House Reconstruction, and approved the actions already taken by MacArthur and Secretary of State Dean Acheson. At another meeting at Blair House held on the evening of 26 June, amid reports of a rapidly deteriorating situation in South Korea, Truman approved the use of air and naval forces against military targets south of the 38th parallel north.

Subsequently, on 27 June, the United Nations Security Council passed Resolution 83, which recommended that "members of the United Nations furnish such assistance to the Republic of Korea as may be necessary to repel the armed attack and to restore international peace and security in the area". The South Korean capital of Seoul fell on 28 June. The next day, Truman authorized air and naval operations north of the 38th parallel, which MacArthur had already ordered. However it was not until 30 June, following a sobering report on the military situation from MacArthur, that Truman finally authorized the use of ground forces.

On 8 July, on the advice of the Joint Chiefs of Staff, Truman appointed MacArthur commander of United Nations Command in South Korea. He remained Commander-in-Chief Far East and Supreme Commander of the Allied Powers. MacArthur was forced to commit his forces in Japan to what he later described as a "desperate rearguard action". In July, Truman sent the Chief of Staff of the Army, General J. Lawton Collins, and the Chief of Staff of the Air Force, General Hoyt S. Vandenberg, to report on the situation. They met with MacArthur and his chief of staff, Major General Edward Almond, in Tokyo on 13 July. MacArthur impressed on them the danger of underestimating the North Koreans, whom he characterized as "well-equipped, well-led, and battle-trained, and which have at times out-numbered our troops by as much as twenty to one". He proposed to first halt the North Korean advance and then counterattack, enveloping the North Koreans with an amphibious operation, but the timing was dependent on the arrival of reinforcements from the United States.

Bradley raised the possibility of using nuclear weapons in Korea at a Joint Chiefs of Staff meeting on 9 July 1950 at Eisenhower's instigation, but there was no support for the idea. The Army staff sent a cable to Collins in Tokyo suggesting that he seek out MacArthur's opinion. In a teleconference on 13 July, Major General Charles L. Bolte proposed sending nuclear weapons. MacArthur had already turned down Air Force proposals to firebomb North Korean cities, and suggested that atomic bombs could be used to isolate North Korea by taking out bridges and tunnels. The Army staff considered this impractical. On 28 July, the Joint Chiefs decided to send ten nuclear-capable B-29 bombers of the 9th Bombardment Wing to Guam as a deterrent to Chinese action against Taiwan. Truman publicly denied that he was considering the use of nuclear weapons in Korea, but authorized the transfer to Guam of atomic bombs without their fissile cores. The deployment did not go well; one of the bombers crashed on takeoff from Fairfield-Suisun Air Force Base in California on 5 August, killing the mission commander, Brigadier General Robert F. Travis, and 18 others. The remaining nine bombers remained in Guam until 13 September, when they returned to the United States. The bomb assemblies stayed behind.

At a press conference on 13 July, Truman was asked if United States forces would cross the 38th parallel into North Korea, and he replied that he would "make that decision when it becomes necessary to do it". Some of his advisors, including the Assistant Secretary of State for Far Eastern Affairs, Dean Rusk, and the director of the Office of Northeast Asian Affairs, John M. Allison, argued that Security Council Resolution 83 provided a legal basis for the invasion of North Korea. Others, such as George F. Kennan and Paul Nitze, disagreed. Along with the legality, the administration also had to consider the danger of intervention by the Soviet Union or the People's Republic of China if United Nations forces approached their borders.

=== Battle of Inchon ===
MacArthur's early ambitions for an amphibious operation against North Korea had to be shelved due to the deteriorating situation in the south, which compelled him to commit the formation earmarked for the assault, the 1st Cavalry Division, to the defense of the Pusan Perimeter, to which the Eighth Army retreated in August. MacArthur then resumed his planning for an amphibious operation, which he tentatively scheduled for 15 September 1950. Navy and Marine Corps officers including Rear Admiral James H. Doyle, the commander of Amphibious Group One, and Major General Oliver P. Smith, the commander of the 1st Marine Division, were appalled by the proposed landing beaches at Inchon, which featured huge tides, broad mudflats, narrow and treacherous channels, and high seawalls. Omar Bradley called it "the worst possible place ever selected for an amphibious landing". Although the Inchon-Seoul area was a key communications center, the risks of the landing were daunting. Collins and Sherman flew to Tokyo to be briefed on the plans by MacArthur, who declared: "We shall land at Inchon, and I shall crush them."

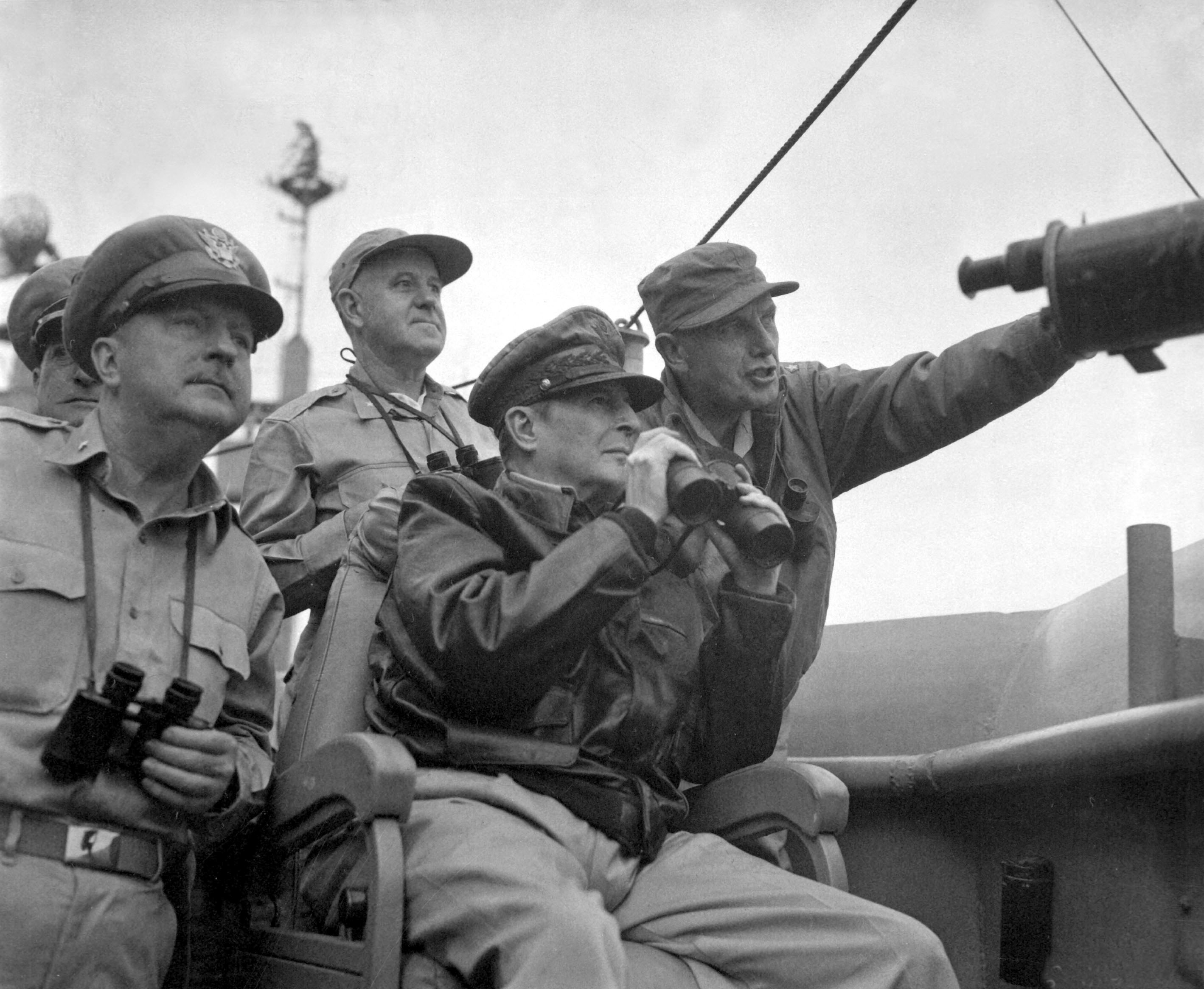
Brigadier General Courtney Whitney (left), General of the Army Douglas MacArthur (seated) and Major General Edward Almond (right) observe the shelling of Inchon from the USS Mount McKinley.

MacArthur was invited to speak at the 51st National Encampment of the Veterans of Foreign Wars in Chicago on 26 August 1950. He declined the invitation, but instead sent a statement to be read aloud, in which he contradicted Truman's policy towards the island of Formosa, saying: "Nothing could be more fallacious than the threadbare argument by those who advocate appeasement and defeatism in the Pacific that if we defend Formosa we alienate continental Asia." Truman was infuriated by the word "appeasement", and discussed the possibility of relieving MacArthur with Secretary of Defense Louis A. Johnson. Johnson responded that MacArthur was "one of the greatest, if not the greatest generals of our generation". Truman told Johnson to send MacArthur an order withdrawing his statement, which he did; but it had already been read into the Congressional Record. As it turned out, it was not MacArthur who was relieved, but Johnson. Truman had become irritated with Johnson's conflict with Secretary of State Acheson, and although he had said that Johnson would remain his Secretary of Defense for "as long as I am President," he asked Johnson for his resignation. Publicly, Johnson received much of the blame for the defense cuts that had led to the lack of preparedness and consequent early defeats in Korea. He was replaced by General of the Army George Marshall.

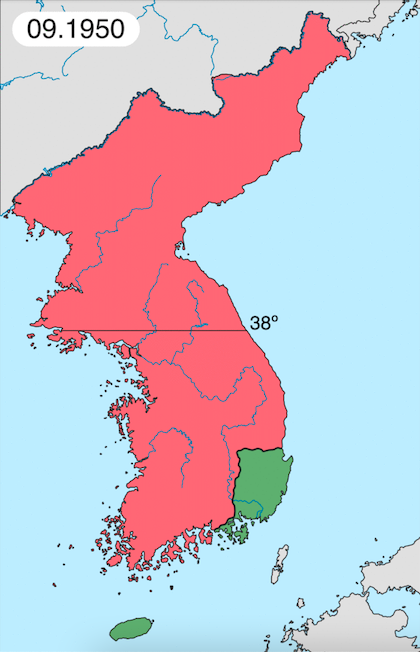
Korean War in September 1950 before the Battle of Inchon

MacArthur held that his military objective was the destruction of the North Korean Army. That being the case, operations would be necessary north of the 38th parallel, although his Assistant Chief of Staff, G-2, Major General Charles A. Willoughby, warned on 31 August that 37 Chinese divisions were grouping on the border between China and North Korea. The Joint Chiefs agreed with MacArthur on this issue. A National Security Council paper endorsed the legality of action north of the 38th parallel. The paper recommended that only South Korean troops be employed in the border regions with China and the Soviet Union. Should the Soviet Union intervene, MacArthur was to immediately retreat to the 38th parallel; but in the case of Chinese intervention, he was to keep fighting "as long as action by UN military forces offers a reasonable chance of successful resistance". Truman endorsed the report on 11 September, but MacArthur remained in the dark because of the changeover of Secretaries of Defense, and was not informed until 22 September. When Truman was asked at a press conference on 21 September whether he had concluded to conduct operations in North Korea, he replied that he had not.

In the meantime, MacArthur's amphibious assault at Inchon went ahead on 15 September. "The success of Inchon was so great and the subsequent prestige of General MacArthur was so overpowering," Collins later recalled, "that the Chiefs hesitated thereafter to question later plans and decisions of the general, which should have been challenged." In response to a rumor that the Eighth Army planned to halt at the 38th parallel and await United Nations authorization to cross, Marshall sent a message to MacArthur informing him that: "We want you to feel unhampered tactically and strategically to proceed north of 38th parallel. Announcement above referred to may precipitate embarrassment in the UN where evident desire is not to be confronted with necessity of a vote on passage, rather to find you have found it militarily necessary to do so." A few days later, MacArthur was instructed not to issue an announcement that his forces had crossed the 38th parallel. On 7 October a United Nations General Assembly Resolution was passed that could be broadly construed as permitting the invasion of North Korea.

=== Wake Island Conference ===
With the 1950 mid-term elections drawing near, and Truman abstaining from overt campaigning while the troops were fighting in Korea, members of Truman's staff, most notably George Elsey, came up with another way to garner votes for the Democratic Party. In July 1944, President Franklin Roosevelt had traveled to Hawaii to meet with MacArthur and Admiral Chester Nimitz. At this meeting, Roosevelt made the decision to attack the Philippines in the final year of the Pacific war. It was a political triumph in an election year, refuting Republican claims that Roosevelt fixated on Europe at the expense of the Pacific.

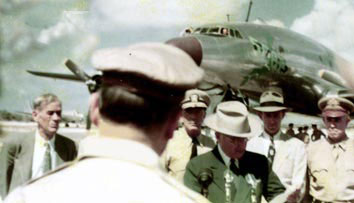
President Truman reads the citation for the award of a fourth oak leaf cluster to MacArthur's Distinguished Service Medal on Wake Island. In the background are from left: Press Secretary Charles Ross, Commander in Chief Pacific Admiral Arthur Radford, Secretary of the Army Frank Pace, and Chairman of the Joint Chiefs General Omar Bradley.

Truman emulated this by flying to the Pacific to meet MacArthur. Initially, Truman was unenthusiastic about the idea, as he disliked publicity stunts, but in October 1950, in the wake of the victories at Pusan and Inchon, Truman felt he could emphasize his own part in the victories by meeting with MacArthur. A message was sent to MacArthur suggesting a meeting on Hawaii or Wake Island, and he replied that he "would be delighted to meet the President on the morning of the 15th at Wake Island". When MacArthur discovered that the president would be bringing the news media with him, he asked if he could bring correspondents from Tokyo. His request was denied.

Truman arrived at Wake Island on 15 October, where he was greeted on the tarmac by MacArthur, who had arrived the day before. MacArthur shook hands with the president rather than salute, and declined an offer to stay for lunch with the president, which Bradley considered "insulting". This did not bother Truman; what did annoy the president, a former haberdasher, was MacArthur's "greasy ham and eggs cap that evidently had been in use for twenty years". The meeting, which had no agenda and no structure, took the form of a free-wheeling discussion between the president and his advisors on one hand, and MacArthur and the Commander in Chief, Pacific Fleet, Admiral Arthur Radford, on the other. Topics discussed included Formosa, the Philippines and the wars in Vietnam and Korea. MacArthur noted that "No new policies, no new strategy of war or international politics, were proposed or discussed." Robert Sherrod, who was present as a correspondent, felt that he "had witnessed nothing but a political grandstand play".

MacArthur did say things that would later be used against him. When asked by the president about the odds of Soviet or Chinese intervention in Korea, MacArthur replied:

Very little. Had they interfered in the first or second months it would have been decisive. We are no longer fearful of their intervention. We no longer stand hat in hand. The Chinese have 300,000 men in Manchuria. Of these probably not more than 100–115,000 are distributed along the Yalu River. Only 50–60,000 could be gotten across the Yalu River. They have no Air Force. Now that we have bases for our Air Force in Korea if the Chinese tried to get down to Pyongyang there would be the greatest slaughter.

MacArthur expressed the hope that the Eighth Army could withdraw to Japan by the end of the year. When Bradley asked if a division could be sent to Europe, MacArthur replied that he could make one available in January. In fact, Chinese troops had already begun crossing the Yalu into North Korea, and by November 180,000 had done so.

=== Chinese intervention ===
When he returned from Wake Island, MacArthur faced the challenge of turning his promises into reality. On 24 October, he ordered his principal subordinates, Lieutenant General Walton Walker, the commander of the Eighth Army, and Major General Edward Almond of X Corps, to "drive forward with all speed and full utilization of all their force". He also lifted the prohibition on troops other than South Koreans operating along the borders with China and the Soviet Union. Collins considered this a violation of the orders that the Joint Chiefs had issued on 27 September, but MacArthur pointed out that it was only, in the words of the original directive, "a matter of policy". He added that the matter had been raised at Wake Island, but no one else recalled this, particularly not Truman, who, unaware of these discussions, told reporters on 26 October that Koreans and not Americans would occupy the border areas. Within days, MacArthur's forces had encountered the Chinese in the Battle of Onjong and the Battle of Unsan.

Truman did not relieve MacArthur for the military reverses in Korea in November and December 1950. Truman later stated that he felt that MacArthur was no more to blame than General of the Army Dwight Eisenhower was for the military reverses he had suffered during the Battle of the Bulge but this did not mean that it did not factor into his decision. "I considered him a great strategist," Truman later recalled, "until he made the march into North Korea without the knowledge that he should have had of the Chinese coming in."

In an attempt to slow the Chinese advance, MacArthur ordered the bridges across the Yalu to be bombed. After due consultation with his advisers, Truman declared that he would not approve of such an action, and the Joint Chiefs canceled the order. When MacArthur protested, the president and the Joint Chiefs authorized the bombings, subject to the caveat that Chinese air space not be violated. Major General Emmett O'Donnell would later cite this to the Congressional inquiry into MacArthur's relief as an example of undue political interference in military operations. The Yalu River had many bends, and in some cases there were very restricted lines of approach without overflying the Yalu. This made life easier for the Communist antiaircraft gunners, but correspondingly less so for the aircrew. Within weeks, MacArthur was forced to retreat, and both Truman and MacArthur were forced to contemplate the prospect of abandoning Korea entirely.

=== Nuclear weapons ===
At a press conference on 30 November 1950, Truman was asked about the use of nuclear weapons:

Q. Mr. President, I wonder if we could retrace that reference to the atom bomb? Did we understand you clearly that the use of the atomic bomb is under active consideration?
Truman: Always has been. It is one of our weapons.
Q. Does that mean, Mr. President, use against military objectives, or civilian—
Truman: It's a matter that the military people will have to decide. I'm not a military authority that passes on those things.
Q. Mr. President, perhaps it would be better if we are allowed to quote your remarks on that directly?
Truman: I don't think—I don't think that is necessary.
Q. Mr. President, you said this depends on United Nations action. Does that mean that we wouldn't use the atomic bomb except on a United Nations authorization?
Truman: No, it doesn't mean that at all. The action against Communist China depends on the action of the United Nations. The military commander in the field will have charge of the use of the weapons, as he always has.

The implication was that the authority to use atomic weapons now rested in the hands of MacArthur. Truman's White House issued a clarification, noting that "only the President can authorize the use of the atom bomb, and no such authorization has been given," yet the comment still caused a domestic and international stir. Truman had touched upon one of the most sensitive issues in civil–military relations in the post–World War II period: civilian control of nuclear weapons, which was enshrined in the Atomic Energy Act of 1946.

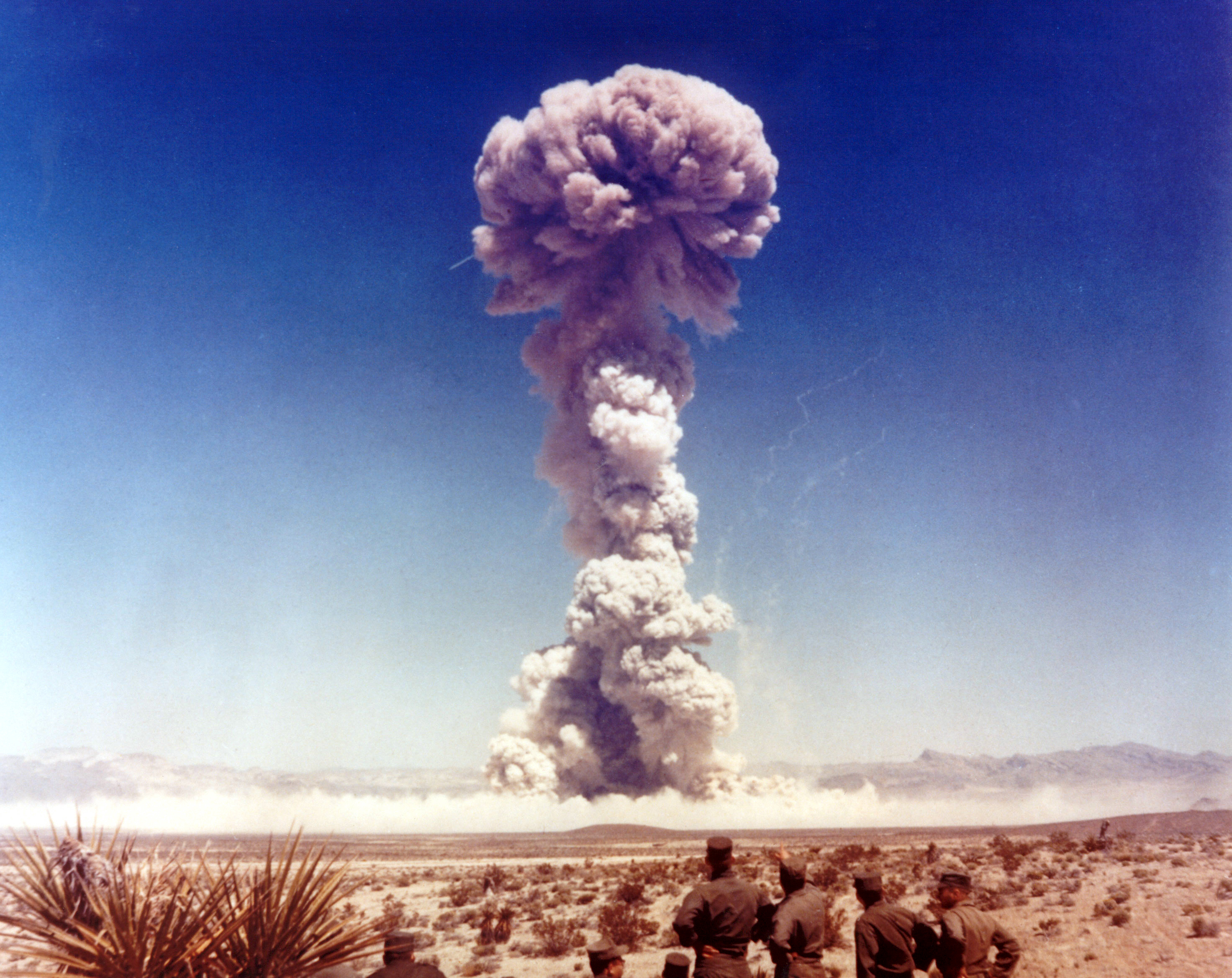
Military personnel observe Operation Buster-Jangle in November 1951.

On 9 December 1950, MacArthur requested field commander's discretion to employ nuclear weapons; he testified that such an employment would only be used to prevent an ultimate fallback, not to recover the situation in Korea. On 24 December 1950, while responding to a formal request from the Pentagon, MacArthur submitted a list of "retardation targets" in Korea, Manchuria and other parts of China, for which 34 atomic bombs would be required.

In June 1950, Louis Johnson released a study on the potential uses of radioactive agents. According to Major General Courtney Whitney, MacArthur considered the possibility of using radioactive wastes to seal off North Korea in December 1950, but he never submitted this to the Joint Chiefs. After his dismissal, Congressman Albert Gore put a similar proposal to Truman. In January 1951, MacArthur refused to entertain proposals for the forward deployment of nuclear weapons.

In early April 1951, the Joint Chiefs became alarmed by the buildup of Soviet forces in the Far East, particularly bombers and submarines. On 5 April 1951, they drafted orders for MacArthur authorizing attacks on Manchuria and the Shantung Peninsula if the Chinese launched airstrikes against his forces originating from there. The next day Truman met with the chairman of the United States Atomic Energy Commission, Gordon Dean, and arranged for the transfer of nine Mark 4 nuclear bombs to military control. Dean was apprehensive about delegating the decision on how they should be used to MacArthur, who lacked expert technical knowledge of the weapons and their effects. The Joint Chiefs were not entirely comfortable about giving them to MacArthur either, for fear that he might prematurely carry out his orders. Instead, they decided that the nuclear strike force would report to the Strategic Air Command (SAC). This time the bombers deployed with the fissile cores. SAC did not intend to attack air bases and depots; the bombers would target industrial cities in North Korea and China. Deployments of SAC bombers to Guam continued until the end of the war.

There has been debate whether MacArthur advocated the employment of nuclear weapons, including over whether his submission to the Joint Chiefs of Staff was tantamount to a recommendation. In his testimony before the Senate Inquiry, he stated that he had not recommended their use. In 1960, MacArthur challenged a statement by Truman that he had wanted to use nuclear weapons, saying that "atomic bombing in the Korean War was never discussed either by my headquarters or in any communication to or from Washington"; Truman, admitting that he did not have documentation of any such claim, said that he was merely providing his personal opinion. In interview with Jim G. Lucas and Bob Considine on 25 January 1954, posthumously published in 1964, MacArthur said:

Of all the campaigns of my life, 20 major ones to be exact, [Korea was] the one I felt most sure of was the one I was deprived of waging. I could have won the war in Korea in a maximum of 10 days.... I would have dropped between 30 and 50 atomic bombs on his air bases and other depots strung across the neck of Manchuria.... It was my plan as our amphibious forces moved south to spread behind us—from the Sea of Japan to the Yellow Sea—a belt of radioactive cobalt. It could have been spread from wagons, carts, trucks and planes.... For at least 60 years there could have been no land invasion of Korea from the north. The enemy could not have marched across that radiated belt.

In 1985 Richard Nixon recalled discussing the atomic bombings of Hiroshima and Nagasaki with MacArthur:

MacArthur once spoke to me very eloquently about it, pacing the floor of his apartment in the Waldorf. He thought it a tragedy the bomb was ever exploded. MacArthur believed that the same restrictions ought to apply to atomic weapons as to conventional weapons, that the military objective should always be limited damage to noncombatants... MacArthur, you see, was a soldier. He believed in using force only against military targets, and that is why the nuclear thing turned him off, which I think speaks well of him.

MacArthur's advice to President John F. Kennedy during the Cuban Missile Crisis in 1962 divulged his viewpoints on nuclear warfare while acting as Kennedy's personal military advisor. In a very long meeting in the White House between MacArthur and Kennedy in August 1962 after Kennedy received intelligence that the Soviet Union transported nuclear weapons to Cuba, MacArthur told Kennedy to not invade or bomb Cuba and also to not use nuclear weapons on Cuba, which would have led to the deaths of thousands of Soviet and Cuban soldiers. He advised Kennedy to simply do a naval blockade, which was exactly what Kennedy did two months later when the crisis reached its zenith. "The greatest weapon of war is the blockade," he told Kennedy. "If war comes, that is the weapon we should use." In contrast to MacArthur, all members of the Joint Chiefs of Staff and the majority of EXCOMM urged Kennedy to first bomb and then invade Cuba, claiming that a blockade would show weakness and entice the Soviets to become more aggressive. They also argued for nuclear weapons to be used on Cuba if the Soviets responded militarily to a first-strike attack by the United States.

=== Foreign pressure ===
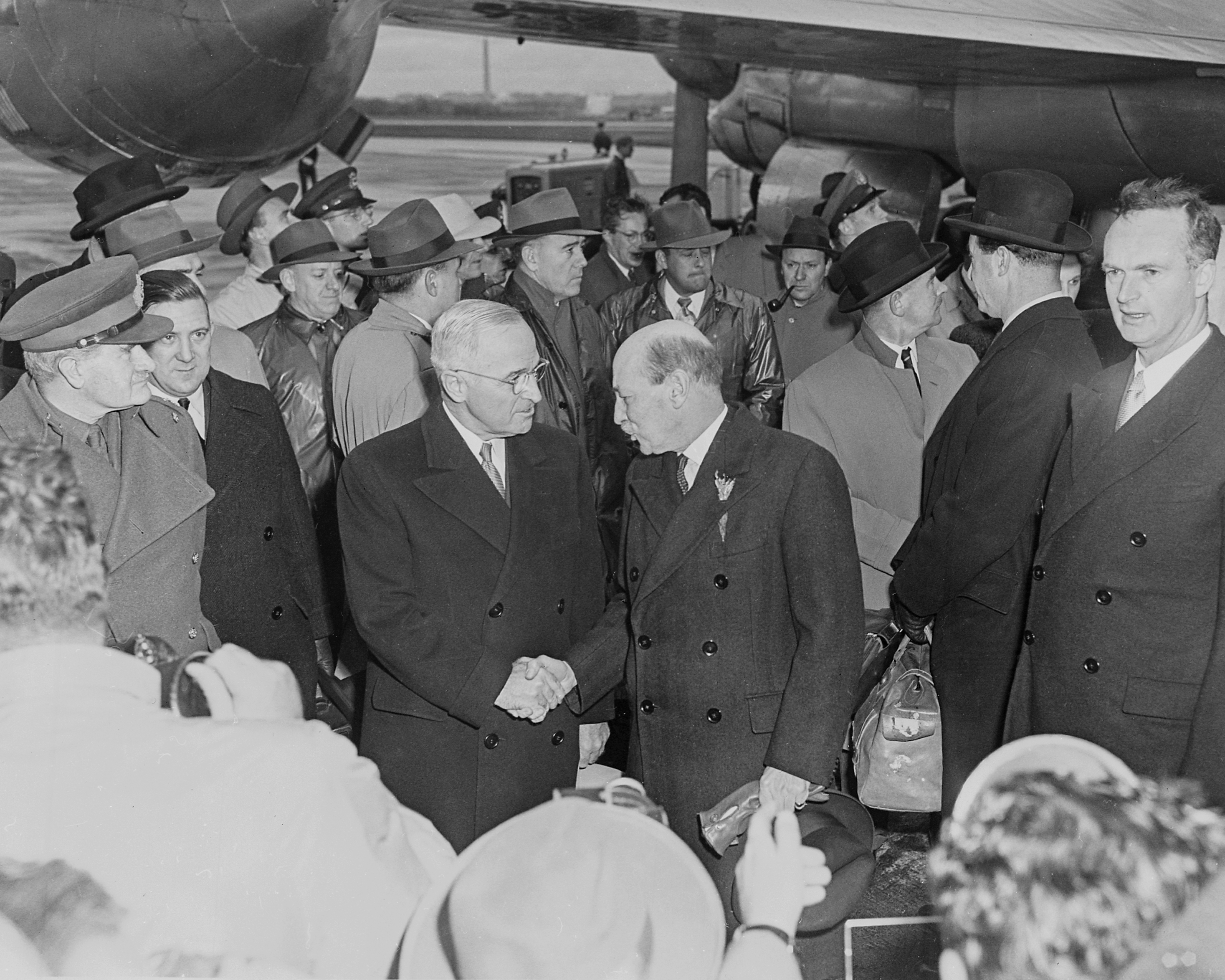
Truman (foreground, left) greets British prime minister Clement Attlee (foreground, right) at Washington National Airport, on Attlee's arrival for talks on the Korean crisis. Also present is Sir Oliver Franks, British Ambassador to the United States (right), and Field Marshal Sir William Slim (left), the Chief of the Imperial General Staff.

The British prime minister, Clement Attlee, was particularly disturbed by Truman's gaffe about nuclear weapons, and sought to revive the wartime Quebec Agreement, under which the United States would not use nuclear weapons without Britain's consent. The British were concerned that the United States was drifting into a war with China. In a visit to the United States in December 1950, Attlee raised the fears of the British and other European governments that "General MacArthur was running the show". As MacArthur's views about the importance of Asia in world affairs were well known, it was feared that the United States would shift its focus away from Europe. In this instance, MacArthur was defended by Bradley, whose anglophobia dated back to World War II.

The British became alarmed in January 1951 when the Americans began talking of evacuating Korea. The British argued that to maintain European faith and unity it was vital to maintain some presence in Korea, even if it was nothing more than a toehold in the Pusan area. Once again, Bradley defended MacArthur, but it was clear that he had become an irritant in the relationship between the two countries.

=== Public statements ===
On 1 December 1950, MacArthur was asked by a reporter if the restrictions on operations against Chinese forces on the far side of the Yalu River were "a handicap to effective military operations". He replied that they were indeed "an enormous handicap, unprecedented in military history". On 6 December, Truman issued a directive requiring all military officers and diplomatic officials to clear with the State Department all but routine statements before making them public, "and...refrain from direct communications on military or foreign policy with newspapers, magazines, and other publicity media". Major General Courtney Whitney gave MacArthur a legal opinion that this applied "solely to formal public statements and not to communiqués, correspondence or personal conversations". However, MacArthur went on to make similar remarks in press statements on 13 February and 7 March 1951.

In February and March 1951, the tide of war began to turn again, and MacArthur's forces drove north. Seoul, which had fallen on 4 January, was recaptured on 17 March. This raised hopes in Washington that the Chinese and North Koreans might be amenable to a ceasefire agreement, and Truman prepared a statement to this effect. MacArthur was informed of it by the Joint Chiefs on 20 March, and he warned the new commander of the Eighth Army, Lieutenant General Matthew B. Ridgway, that political constraints might soon impose limits on his proposed operations. On 23 March, MacArthur issued a communiqué about offering a ceasefire to the Chinese:

Of even greater significance than our tactical successes has been the clear revelation that this new enemy, Red China, of such exaggerated and vaunted military power, lacks the industrial capability to provide adequately many critical items necessary to the conduct of modern war. He lacks the manufacturing base and those raw materials needed to produce, maintain and operate even moderate air and naval power, and he cannot provide the essentials for successful ground operations, such as tanks, heavy artillery and other refinements science has introduced into the conduct of military campaigns. Formerly his great numerical potential might well have filled this gap but with the development of existing methods of mass destruction numbers alone do not offset the vulnerability inherent in such deficiencies. Control of the seas and the air, which in turn means control over supplies, communications and transportation, are no less essential and decisive now than in the past. When this control exists, as in our case, and is coupled with an inferiority of ground firepower in the enemy's case, the resulting disparity is such that it cannot be overcome by bravery, however fanatical, or the most gross indifference to human loss.

These military weaknesses have been clearly and definitely revealed since Red China entered upon its undeclared war in Korea. Even under the inhibitions which now restrict the activity of the United Nations forces and the corresponding military advantages which accrue to Red China, it has been shown its complete inability to accomplish by force of arms the conquest of Korea. The enemy, therefore must by now be painfully aware that a decision of the United Nations to depart from its tolerant effort to contain the war to the area of Korea, through an expansion of our military operations to its coastal areas and interior bases, would doom Red China to the risk of imminent military collapse. These basic facts being established, there should be no insuperable difficulty in arriving at decisions on the Korean problem if the issues are resolved on their own merits, without being burdened by extraneous matters not directly related to Korea, such as Formosa or China's seat in the United Nations.

The next day, MacArthur authorized Ridgway to advance up to 20 miles (32 km) north of the 38th Parallel. Truman would later report that "I was ready to kick him into the North China Sea...I was never so put out in my life." Truman felt that MacArthur's communiqué, which had not been cleared in accordance with the December directive, had pre-empted his own proposal. He later wrote:

This was a most extraordinary statement for a military commander of the United Nations to issue on his own responsibility. It was an act totally disregarding all directives to abstain from any declarations on foreign policy. It was in open defiance of my orders as President and as Commander-in-Chief. This was a challenge to the authority of the President under the Constitution. It also flouted the policy of the United Nations. By this act MacArthur left me no choice—I could no longer tolerate his insubordination.

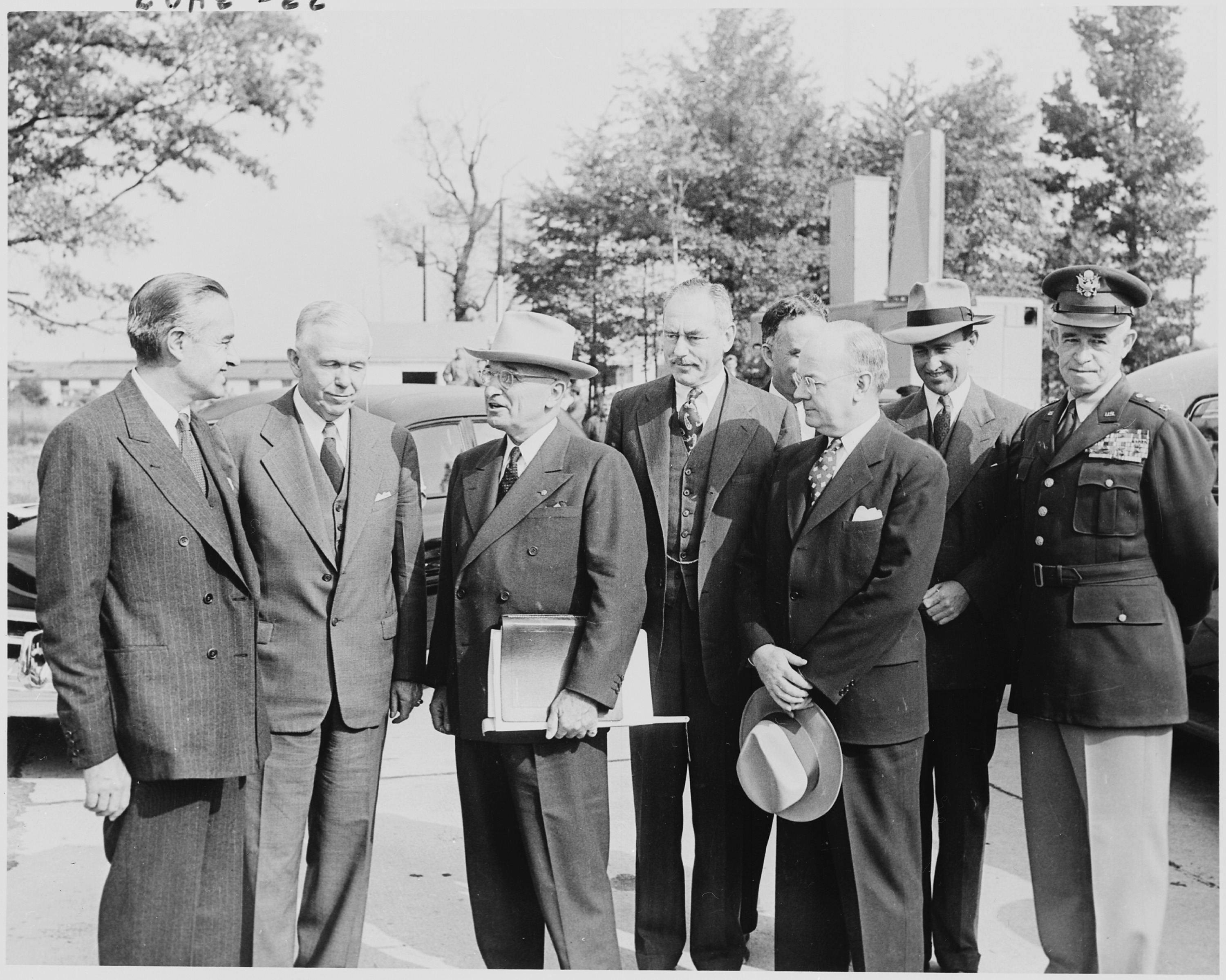
Harry Truman returns from the Wake Island Conference with General MacArthur and Admiral Radford. Left to right: presidential advisor Averell Harriman; Secretary of Defense George Marshall; President Harry Truman; Secretary of State Dean Acheson; Ambassador at Large Philip Jessup; Secretary of the Treasury John W. Snyder; Secretary of the Army Frank Pace; Chairman of the Joint Chiefs of Staff Omar Bradley.

For the moment, however, he did. There had been dramatic confrontations over policy before, the most notable of which was between President Abraham Lincoln and Major General George McClellan, in 1862. Another example was President James Polk's recall of Major General Winfield Scott after the Mexican–American War. Before relieving MacArthur, Truman consulted history books on how Lincoln and Polk dealt with their generals. Truman later said that Polk was his favorite president because "he had the courage to tell Congress to go to Hell on foreign policy matters".

There were genuine differences of opinion over policy between MacArthur and the Truman administration. One was MacArthur's deep-seated belief that it was not possible to separate the struggle against communism in Europe from that going on in Asia. This was seen as the result of being stationed for too many years in East Asia, and of his perspective as a theater commander responsible only for part of the Far East. Another important policy difference was MacArthur's belief that China was not, as Acheson maintained, "the Soviet Union's largest and most important satellite," but an independent state with its own agenda that, in MacArthur's words, "for its own purposes is [just temporarily] allied with Soviet Russia". If MacArthur's thesis was accepted, then it followed that expanding the war with China would not provoke a conflict with the Soviet Union. The Joint Chiefs emphatically disagreed, although this contradicted their position that it was Europe and not Asia that was the prime concern of the Soviet Union. Even among Republicans, there was little support for MacArthur's position.

On 5 April, House of Representatives minority leader Joseph W. Martin Jr. read the text of a letter he had received from MacArthur, dated 20 March, criticizing the Truman administration's priorities on the floor of the House. In it, MacArthur had written:

It seems strangely difficult for some to realize that here in Asia is where the Communist conspirators have elected to make their play for global conquest, and that we have joined the issue thus raised on the battlefield; that here we fight Europe's war with arms while the diplomatic there still fight it with words; that if we lose the war to communism in Asia the fall of Europe is inevitable; win it and Europe most probably would avoid war and yet preserve freedom. As you pointed out, we must win. There is no substitute for victory.

MacArthur later wrote that Martin had released the letter "for some unexplained reason and without consulting me", but it had not been marked as being confidential or off the record.

MacArthur had said in 1951: "The war in Korea has almost destroyed that nation. I have never seen such devastation.... If you go on indefinitely, you are perpetuating a slaughter such as I have never heard of in the history of mankind."

=== Diplomatic dispatch intercepts ===
The practice of intercepting and decrypting diplomatic messages of friend and foe alike was a closely held secret in the 1950s. In mid-March 1951, Truman learned through such intercepts that MacArthur had conversations with diplomats in Spain's and Portugal's Tokyo embassies. In these talks, MacArthur had expressed confidence that he would succeed in expanding the Korean War into a major conflict resulting in the permanent disposal of the "Chinese Communist question" and MacArthur did not want either country to be alarmed if this happened. The content of this particular intercept was known by only a very few of Truman's closest advisers, two being Paul Nitze, Director of the Policy Planning Staff of the State Department, and his associate, Charles Burton Marshall. Truman considered MacArthur's conversations outright treachery and concluded that MacArthur had to be relieved but was unable to act immediately because of MacArthur's political support and to avoid broader knowledge of the existence of the electronic intercepts of diplomatic messages. Several weeks earlier, MacArthur had recommended to the Joint Chiefs of Staff that he be authorized to retaliate immediately against targets on mainland China in the event of Chinese Communist air or sea attacks against Formosa (now Taiwan) or United States forces outside Korea. The Joint Chiefs responded by granting qualified approval.

=== Provoking China ===
Ridgway had prepared an offensive known as Operation Rugged, and pressed MacArthur for permission to launch it. On 15 March 1951, the day after Seoul had been recaptured a second time, Truman had responded to a reporter's question about whether UN forces would again be allowed to move north of the 38th parallel by saying that it would be "a tactical matter for the field commander". MacArthur thereupon gave Ridgway permission to launch his attack, setting an objective line north of the 38th parallel that would secure Seoul's water supply. He did so without consulting with Washington until after the attack began on 5 April 1951. It was making steady progress when MacArthur was relieved on 11 April.

Following the completion of flight operations the evening of 7 April 1951, Task Force 77, the Seventh Fleet's fast carrier task force, with the carriers USS Boxer and USS Philippine Sea, departed Korean waters in the Sea of Japan bound for the Straits of Formosa. At 11:00 on 11 April, Task Force 77 operating near the west coast of Taiwan, commenced an "aerial parade" along the east coast of mainland China. Concurrently, the destroyer USS John A. Bole arrived at its assigned station 3 miles (4.8 km) offshore from the Chinese seaport of Swatow (Shantou), provoking the Chinese to surround it with an armada of over 40 armed powered junks. Although Task Force 77 was conducting its aerial parade over the horizon to the west, nearly two hours passed before aircraft from the task force appeared over Swatow and made threatening passes at the Chinese vessels and the port city. MacArthur officially received notification of his dismissal shortly after 15:00 Tokyo time (14:00 on the China coast), although he had found out about it half an hour before. Two hours later, the Bole retired from its station without hostile action being initiated by either side. Author James Edwin Alexander expressed the opinion that the Bole and its crew were made "sitting ducks" by MacArthur trying to provoke the Chinese into attacking a U.S. warship in an attempt to expand the conflict.

Rear Admiral Samuel J. Cox, director of the Naval History and Heritage Command, stated that although some historians like Alexander had circumstantial evidence that this was a provocation plot by MacArthur, there is no direct evidence to prove that claim. Cox said it was also possible that the ship was on an intelligence mission to directly observe the junk ships. For over a month, the U.S. military had worried about a Chinese invasion of Taiwan after witnessing an unusually large armada of junk boats – potentially an invasion fleet – gathering together on the Chinese coast opposite of Taiwan.

MacArthur was determined to expand the war into China, which other officials believed would needlessly escalate a limited war and consume too many already overstretched resources. Despite MacArthur's claims that he was restricted to fighting a limited war when China was fighting all-out, congressional testimony revealed China was using restraint as much as the U.S. was. The Chinese were not using air power against front-line troops, communication lines, ports, naval air forces, or staging bases in Japan, which had been crucial to the survival of UN forces in Korea. Simply fighting on the peninsula had already tied down significant portions of U.S. airpower; as Air Force chief of staff Hoyt Vandenberg said, 80–85% of the tactical capacity, one-fourth of the strategic portion, and 20% of air defense forces of the USAF were engaged in a single country. There was also fear that crossing into China would provoke the Soviet Union into entering the war. General Omar Bradley testified that there were 35 Russian divisions totaling some 500,000 troops in the Far East. Additionally, there were approximately 85 Russian submarines in the vicinity of Korea. If sent into action, these forces could overwhelm U.S. forces and cut supply lines, as well as potentially assist China in conquering territory in Southeast Asia.

== Relief ==
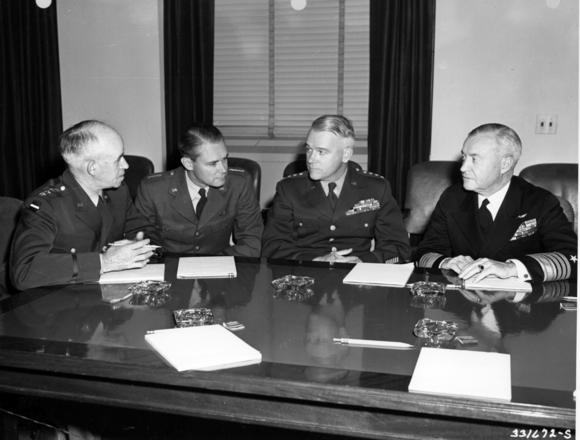
Members of the Joint Chiefs of Staff meet in their conference room at the Pentagon in 1949. Left to right: General Omar Bradley, Chairman of the Joint Chiefs of Staff; General Hoyt Vandenberg (Air Force); General J. Lawton Collins (Army); and Admiral Forrest Sherman (Navy).

On the morning of 6 April 1951, Truman held a meeting in his office with Marshall, Bradley, Acheson, and Harriman to discuss what would be done about MacArthur. Harriman was emphatically in favor of MacArthur's relief, but Bradley opposed it. George Marshall asked for more time to consider the matter. Acheson was personally in favor of relieving MacArthur but did not disclose this. Instead, he warned Truman that it would be "the biggest fight of your administration".

At a second meeting the next day, Marshall and Bradley continued to oppose relief. On 8 April, the Joint Chiefs met with Marshall in his office. Each of the chiefs in turn expressed the opinion that MacArthur's relief was desirable from a "military point of view," but they recognized that military considerations were not paramount. They were concerned that "if MacArthur were not relieved, a large segment of our people would charge that civil authorities no longer controlled the military". The four advisers met with Truman in his office again on 9 April. Bradley informed the president of the views of the Joint Chiefs, and Marshall added that he agreed with them. Truman wrote in his diary that "it is of unanimous opinion of all that MacArthur be relieved. All four so advise." Later, before Congress, the Joint Chiefs would insist that they had only "concurred" with the relief, not "recommended" it. On 11 April 1951, President Truman drafted an order to MacArthur, which was issued under Bradley's signature:

I deeply regret that it becomes my duty as President and Commander-in-Chief of the United States military forces to replace you as Supreme Commander, Allied Powers; Commander-in-Chief, United Nations Command; Commander-in-Chief, Far East; and Commanding General, U.S. Army, Far East.

You will turn over your commands, effective at once, to Lt. Gen. Matthew B. Ridgway. You are authorized to have issued such orders as are necessary to complete desired travel to such place as you select.

My reasons for your replacement, will be made public concurrently with the delivery to you of the foregoing order, and are contained in the next following message.

In a 1973 article in Time magazine, Truman was quoted as saying in the early 1960s:

I fired him because he wouldn't respect the authority of the President. I didn't fire him because he was a dumb son of a bitch, although he was, but that's not against the law for generals. If it was, half to three-quarters of them would be in jail.

Although Truman and Acheson accused MacArthur of insubordination, the Joint Chiefs avoided any suggestion of this. MacArthur was not, in fact, relieved for insubordination. Insubordination was a military offense, and MacArthur could have requested a public court-martial similar to that of Billy Mitchell in the 1920s. The outcome of such a trial was uncertain, and it might well have found him not guilty and ordered his reinstatement. The Joint Chiefs agreed that there was "little evidence that General MacArthur had ever failed to carry out a direct order of the Joint Chiefs, or acted in opposition to an order". "In point of fact," Bradley insisted, "MacArthur had stretched but not legally violated any JCS directives. He had violated the President's 6 December directive, relayed to him by the JCS, but this did not constitute violation of a JCS order."

Truman only publicly claimed that MacArthur committed insubordination starting in 1956 when his memoirs were released. Truman's official reason for the relief was MacArthur's numerous public statements that disagreed with Truman, not insubordination. MacArthur responded to Truman's accusation of insubordination in 1956 by saying that Truman, now a private citizen, only accused him of insubordination years afterwards so MacArthur was unable to sue him for a court-martial hearing to clear his name. MacArthur retorted to Truman's delayed accusations of insubordination that he was probably fired because he called for an investigation in January 1951 of allegations that the Cambridge Five spy ring that had infiltrated the British government's Foreign Office had transferred to Moscow and Beijing all of MacArthur and Walton Walker's war plans as well as Truman's rules of engagement. Aerial reconnaissance over Manchuria and bombing China with conventional bombs by UN forces were not allowed by Truman before and after China's entrance to the war.

The intention was that MacArthur would be personally notified of his relief by Secretary of the Army Frank Pace, who was touring the front in Korea, at 20:00 on 11 April Washington, D.C. time, which was 10:00 on 12 April Tokyo time. However, Pace did not receive the message due to a signals failure in Korea. Meanwhile, reporters began asking if rumors of MacArthur's relief were true. Truman then "decided that we could not afford the courtesy of Secretary Pace's personal delivery of the order," and called a press conference at which he issued his statement to the press:

With deep regret I have concluded that General of the Army Douglas MacArthur is unable to give his wholehearted support to the policies of the United States Government and of the United Nations in matters pertaining to his official duties. In view of the specific responsibilities imposed upon me by the Constitution of the United States and the added responsibility which has been entrusted to me by the United Nations, I have decided that I must make a change of command in the Far East. I have, therefore, relieved General MacArthur of his commands and have designated Lt. Gen. Matthew B. Ridgway as his successor.

Full and vigorous debate on matters of national policy is a vital element in the constitutional system of our free democracy. It is fundamental, however, that military commanders must be governed by the policies and directives issued to them in the manner provided by our laws and Constitution. In time of crisis, this consideration is particularly compelling.

General MacArthur's place in history as one of our greatest commanders is fully established. The Nation owes him a debt of gratitude for the distinguished and exceptional service which he has rendered his country in posts of great responsibility. For that reason I repeat my regret at the necessity for the action I feel compelled to take in his case.

In Tokyo, MacArthur and his wife were at a luncheon at the American embassy for Senator Warren Magnuson and William Stern, executive vice president of Northwest Airlines, when Colonel Sidney Huff, MacArthur's aide and one of the "Bataan gang" who had escaped from the Philippines with the general in 1942, heard about the relief from commercial radio broadcast. Huff promptly informed Mrs. MacArthur, who in turn told the general. Japanese radio stations soon picked up the story, but the official notice would not arrive for another half hour.

== Issues ==
=== Civilian control of the military ===
Civilian control of the military is an American tradition dating back to the founding of the republic. In his 1965 memoirs, Truman wrote:

If there is one basic element in our Constitution, it is civilian control of the military. Policies are to be made by the elected political officials, not by generals or admirals. Yet time and again General MacArthur had shown that he was unwilling to accept the policies of the administration. By his repeated public statements he was not only confusing our allies as to the true course of our policies but, in fact, was also setting his policy against the President's... If I allowed him to defy the civil authorities in this manner, I myself would be violating my oath to uphold and defend the Constitution.

According to Samuel P. Huntington, "The United States Constitution... despite widespread belief to the contrary, does not provide for civilian control." He asserted that it draws no distinction between civil and military responsibilities, and provides for no subordination of the one to the other. By dividing responsibility for the military between the executive and the legislature, it makes control more difficult. Any attempt by one branch to assert control would likely involve a clash with the other. Debates nominally about civilian control were usually, in practice, about which branch would exercise control rather than how control would be exercised.

The framers of the Constitution did not consider the issue of the management of a distinct and technically sophisticated military profession because no such thing existed at the time. It appeared in the 19th century as a result of social changes brought about by the French Revolution, and technological changes wrought by the Industrial Revolution. Nonetheless, the value of a regular military was still recognized. Although they acknowledged that the militia was essential to intercept escaped slaves and put down slave rebellions, they were aware that the American Revolutionary War had demonstrated the ineffectiveness of the militia as a military force.

=== Apolitical military ===
Another American tradition is that of an apolitical military. This custom was of more recent origin, dating back only to the period after the American Civil War. Few officers voted in the 19th century, but not so much from a lack of interest in politics as because frequently moving from state to state and living on Federal land effectively disenfranchised them under the laws of many states and/or made it impractical for them to vote at a time when casting a ballot in person on Election Day was the only way to vote. It was only under General of the Army William T. Sherman, the Commanding General of the United States Army from 1869 to 1883, who hated politics, that the custom of an apolitical military became firmly established.

Nor, unlike their European counterparts, did American generals and admirals have influence on or involvement in foreign policy; but mainly because in the frontier Army of MacArthur's youth, there was no requirement to do so. This began to change after the Spanish–American War, when American military forces started to be deployed overseas in the Pacific, Asia and the Caribbean for extended periods of time.

The concept of the theater of war developed during World War II. At such a senior level of command, military and political issues tended to merge. As theater commander in the Southwest Pacific, MacArthur had been accountable to the Australian government as well as his own, making him, in President Roosevelt's words to him, "an ambassador as well as Supreme Commander". MacArthur was known for less than wholehearted support for the "Europe first" strategy and was criticized in Washington for bypassing usual communication channels through the prime minister of Australia, John Curtin.

General Marshall expressed this conflict in his testimony before the Senate:

It arises from the inherent difference between the position of a commander whose mission is limited to a particular area and a particular antagonist, and the position of the Joint Chiefs of Staff, the Secretary of Defense and the President, who are responsible for the total security of the United States...and must weigh the interests and objectives in one part of the world with those in others to attain balance...There is nothing new in this divergence, in our military history... What is new and what brought about the necessity for General MacArthur's removal is the wholly unprecedented situation of a local Theater Commander publicly expressing his displeasure at, and his disagreement with, the foreign policy of the United States. [He]... had grown so far out of sympathy with the established policies of the United States that there is grave doubt as to whether he could any longer be permitted to exercise the authority in making decisions that normal command functions would assign to a Theater Commander.

=== Powers of the President ===
In The Federalist Papers, Alexander Hamilton argued that:

The President is to be commander-in-chief of the army and navy of the United States. In this respect his authority would be nominally the same with that of the king of Great Britain, but in substance much inferior to it. It would amount to nothing more than the supreme command and direction of the military and naval forces, as first General and admiral of the Confederacy; while that of the British king extends to the declaring of war and to the raising and regulating of fleets and armies, all which, by the Constitution under consideration, would appertain to the legislature.

But on 26 June 1950, Truman sent the armed forces into Korea without any such Congressional mandate. The subsequent United Nations Security Council resolution authorized military assistance to South Korea, but the United Nations Participation Act laid down that:

The President shall not be deemed to require the authorization of the Congress to make available to the Security Council on its call in order to take action under article 42 of said Charter and pursuant to such special agreement or agreements the armed forces, facilities, or assistance provided for therein: Provided, That ... nothing herein contained shall be construed as an authorization to the President by the Congress to make available to the Security Council for such purpose armed forces, facilities, or assistance in addition to the forces, facilities, and assistance provided for in such special agreement or agreements.

The Congressional inquiry triggered by MacArthur's relief ruled that Truman's actions violated both constitutional and statutory requirements. Although presidents had in the past used extra-legal military force, this was in "fights with pirates, landings of small naval contingents on barbarous or semi-barbarous coasts, the dispatch of small bodies of troops to chase bandits or cattle rustlers across the Mexican border, and the like". Congressman Vito Marcantonio, who opposed the war in Korea, argued that "when we agreed to the United Nations Charter we never agreed to supplant our Constitution with the United Nations Charter. The power to declare and make war is vested in the representatives of the people, in the Congress of the United States."

Senator William F. Knowland noted that:

Article I of the Constitution gives the power to declare war to the Congress and not to the Executive. We are apparently now drifting into a twilight constitutional zone where the executive can put us into war, the fourth largest in our history, without a Congressional declaration or a Congressional resolution recognizing that a state of war started by others already exists. When Congress acts under its constitutional power, every statement for or against the resolution is part of the Congressional Record, and the press and the public are fully informed. The roll-call vote shows how each Member voted. This is responsible and accountable government.

If five or seven men can meet in a closed session in the Blair House or the White House, and put this nation into the fourth largest war from a casualty standpoint, in our history without their statements and recommendations being recorded or available, and without their positions on this matter being known, we have the war-making power transferred from the Congress, operating in the open, to the Executive, operating en camera. That is not, I submit, either responsible or accountable government.

== Aftermath ==
=== Responses to the relief ===
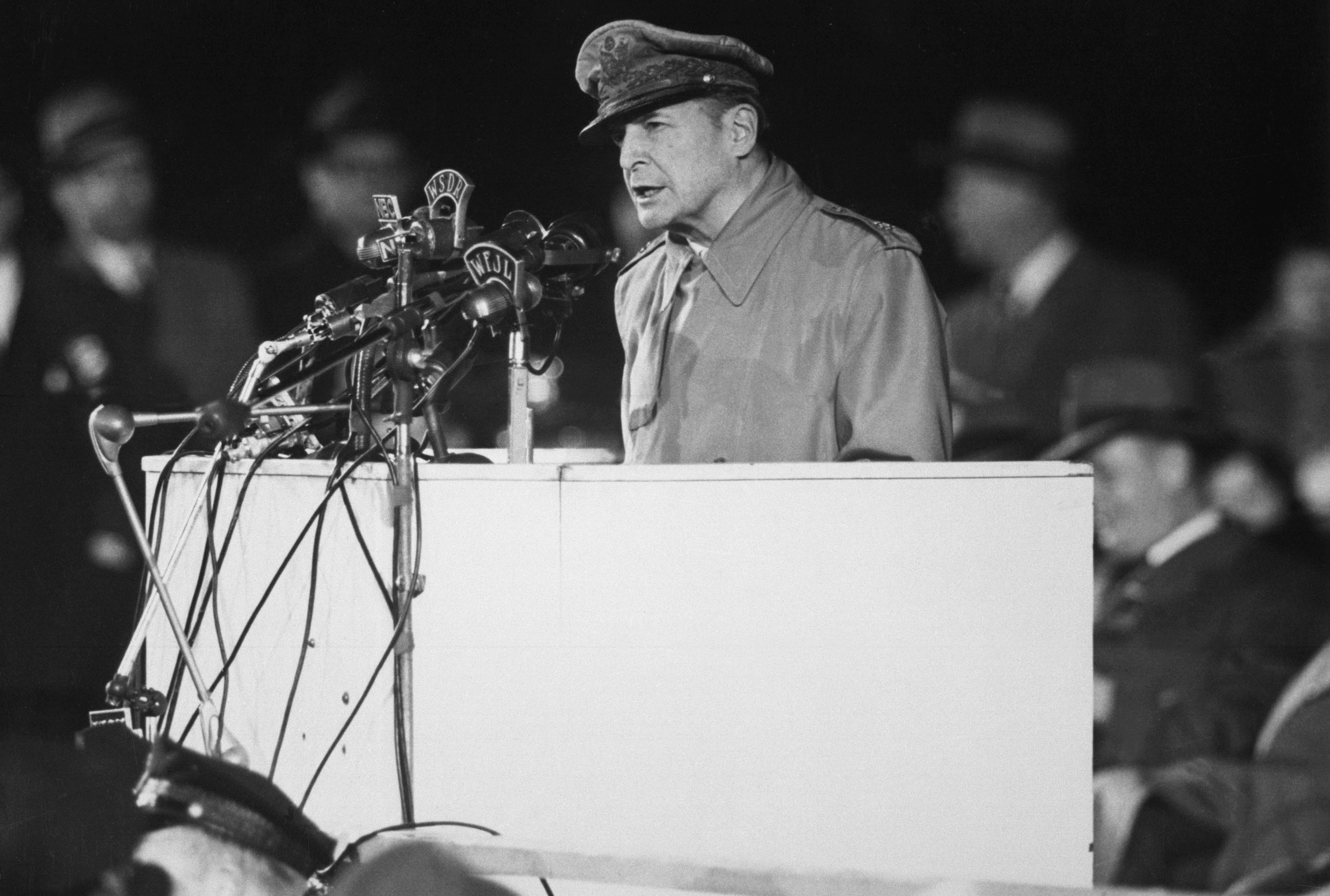
MacArthur addresses an audience of 50,000 at Soldier Field, Chicago on 25 April 1951.

The news of MacArthur's relief was greeted with shock in Japan. The Diet of Japan passed a resolution of gratitude for MacArthur, and the Emperor Hirohito visited him at the embassy in person, the first time a Japanese Emperor had ever visited a foreigner with no standing. The Mainichi Shimbun said:

MacArthur's dismissal is the greatest shock since the end of the war. He dealt with the Japanese people not as a conqueror but a great reformer. He was a noble political missionary. What he gave us was not material aid and democratic reform alone, but a new way of life, the freedom and dignity of the individual... We shall continue to love and trust him as one of the Americans who best understood Japan's position.

In the Chicago Tribune, Senator Robert A. Taft called for immediate impeachment proceedings against Truman:

President Truman must be impeached and convicted. His hasty and vindictive removal of General MacArthur is the culmination of series of acts which have shown that he is unfit, morally and mentally, for his high office. The American nation has never been in greater danger. It is led by a fool who is surrounded by knaves.

Newspapers like the Chicago Tribune and the Los Angeles Times opined that MacArthur's "hasty and vindictive" relief was due to foreign pressure, particularly from the United Kingdom and the British socialists in Attlee's Labour government. The Republican Party whip, Senator Kenneth S. Wherry, charged that the relief was the result of pressure from "the Socialist Government of Great Britain".

On 17 April 1951, MacArthur flew back to the United States, a country he had not seen since 1937. When he reached San Francisco he was greeted by the commander of the Sixth United States Army, Lieutenant General Albert C. Wedemeyer. MacArthur received a parade there that was attended by 500,000 people. He was greeted on arrival at Washington National Airport on 19 April by the Joint Chiefs of Staff and General Jonathan Wainwright. Truman sent Vaughan as his representative, which was seen as a slight, as Vaughan was despised by the public and professional soldiers alike as a corrupt crony. "It was a shameful thing to fire MacArthur, and even more shameful to send Vaughan," one member of the public wrote to Truman.

MacArthur addressed a joint meeting of Congress where he delivered his famous "Old Soldiers Never Die" speech, in which he declared:

Efforts have been made to distort my position. It has been said in effect that I was a warmonger. Nothing could be further from the truth. I know war as few other men now living know it, and nothing to me—and nothing to me is more revolting. I have long advocated its complete abolition, as its very destructiveness on both friend and foe has rendered it useless as a means of settling international disputes... But once war is forced upon us, there is no other alternative than to apply every available means to bring it to a swift end. War's very object is victory, not prolonged indecision. In war there can be no substitute for victory.

In response, the Pentagon issued a press release noting that "the action taken by the President in relieving General MacArthur was based upon the unanimous recommendations of the President's principal civilian and military advisers including the Joint Chiefs of Staff". Afterwards, MacArthur flew to New York City where he received the largest ticker-tape parade in history up to that time. He also visited Chicago and Milwaukee, where he addressed large rallies. Following the relief, most of the avalanche of mail and messages sent to the White House by the public supported MacArthur. On issues like character, integrity, honor and service, they rated MacArthur as the better man. What support Truman garnered was largely based on the principle of civilian control.

=== Congressional inquiry ===
In May and June 1951, the Senate Armed Services Committee and the Senate Foreign Relations Committee held "an inquiry into the military situation in the Far East and the facts surrounding the relief of General of the Army Douglas MacArthur". The Senate thereby attempted to avoid a constitutional crisis. Because of the sensitive political and military topics being discussed, the inquiry was held in closed session, and only a heavily censored transcript was made public until 1973. The two committees were jointly chaired by Senator Richard Russell Jr. Fourteen witnesses were called: MacArthur, Marshall, Bradley, Collins, Vandenberg, Sherman, Adrian S. Fisher, Acheson, Wedemeyer, Johnson, Oscar C. Badger II, Patrick J. Hurley, and David G. Barr and O'Donnell.

The testimony of Marshall and the Joint Chiefs rebutted many of MacArthur's arguments. Marshall emphatically declared that there had been no disagreement between himself, the president, and the Joint Chiefs. However, it also exposed their own timidity in dealing with MacArthur, and that they had not always kept him fully informed. Vandenberg questioned whether the Air Force could be effective against targets in Manchuria, and Bradley noted that the Communists were also waging limited war in Korea, having not attacked UN airbases or ports, or their own "privileged sanctuary" in Japan. Their judgment was that it was not worth it to expand the war, although they conceded that they were prepared to do so if the Communists escalated the conflict, or if no willingness to negotiate was forthcoming. They also disagreed with MacArthur's assessment of the effectiveness of the South Korean and Chinese Nationalist forces. Bradley said:

Red China is not the powerful nation seeking to dominate the world. Frankly, in the opinion of the Joint Chiefs of Staff, this strategy would involve us in the wrong war, at the wrong place, at the wrong time, and with the wrong enemy.

The committees concluded that "the removal of General MacArthur was within the constitutional powers of the President but the circumstances were a shock to national pride". They also found that "there was no serious disagreement between General MacArthur and the Joint Chiefs of Staff as to military strategy." They recommended that "the United States should never again become involved in war without the consent of the Congress".

During the hearings, "MacArthur expressed his feelings of horror at the devastation that the war was inflicting on Koreans, the worst he had ever seen, he said, in his long career as a soldier. At the meeting, he "presented his suggestions to escalate the war in Korea in order to bring it to a speedy conclusion as the most humane solution to the terrible situation."

=== Fallout ===
Polls showed that the majority of the public still disapproved of Truman's decision to relieve MacArthur, and were more inclined to agree with MacArthur than with Bradley or Marshall. Truman's approval rating fell to 23 percent in mid-1951, which was lower than Richard Nixon's low of 25 percent during the Watergate Scandal in 1974, and Lyndon Johnson's of 28 percent at the height of the Vietnam War in 1968. As of 2020, it is the lowest Gallup Poll approval rating recorded by any serving president.

The increasingly unpopular war in Korea dragged on, and the Truman administration was beset with a series of corruption scandals. He eventually decided not to run for re-election. Adlai Stevenson, the Democratic nominee in the 1952 presidential election, attempted to distance himself from the president as much as possible. The election was won by the Republican nominee, General of the Army Dwight D. Eisenhower, whose administration ramped up the pressure on the Chinese in Korea with conventional bombing and renewed threats of using nuclear weapons. Coupled with a more favorable international political climate in the wake of the death of Joseph Stalin in 1953, this led the Chinese and North Koreans to agree to terms. The belief that the threat of nuclear weapons played an important part in the outcome would lead to their threatened use against China several times during the 1950s.

As a result of their support of Truman, the Joint Chiefs became viewed as politically tainted. Senator Taft regarded Bradley in particular with suspicion, due to Bradley's focus on Europe at the expense of Asia. Taft urged Eisenhower to replace the chiefs as soon as possible. First to go was Vandenberg, who had terminal cancer and had already announced plans to retire. On 7 May 1953, Eisenhower announced that he would be replaced by General Nathan Twining. Soon after it was announced that Bradley would be replaced by Admiral Arthur W. Radford, the Commander-in-Chief of the United States Pacific Command, Collins would be succeeded by Ridgway, and Admiral William Fechteler, who had become CNO on the death of Sherman in July 1951, by Admiral Robert B. Carney.

== Legacy ==
The relief of MacArthur cast a long shadow over American civil-military relations. When Lyndon Johnson met with General William Westmoreland in Honolulu in 1966, he told him: "General, I have a lot riding on you. I hope you don't pull a MacArthur on me." For his part, Westmoreland and his senior colleagues were eager to avoid any hint of dissent or challenge to presidential authority. This came at a high price. In his 1998 book Dereliction of Duty: Lyndon Johnson, Robert McNamara, the Joint Chiefs of Staff, and the Lies That Led to Vietnam, then-Lieutenant Colonel H. R. McMaster argued that the Joint Chiefs failed in their duty to provide the president, Secretary of Defense Robert McNamara or Congress with frank and fearless professional advice. This book was an influential one; the chairman of the Joint Chiefs of Staff at the time, General Hugh Shelton, gave copies to every four-star officer in the military.

On the one hand, the relief of MacArthur established a precedent that generals and admirals could be fired for any public or private disagreement with government policy. In 1977, Major General John K. Singlaub publicly criticized proposed cuts in the size of American forces in South Korea, and was summarily relieved by President Jimmy Carter for making statements "inconsistent with announced national security policy". During the Gulf War in 1990, Secretary of Defense Dick Cheney relieved the Chief of Staff of the Air Force, General Michael Dugan, for showing "poor judgment at a very sensitive time" in making a series of statements to the media during a visit to Saudi Arabia. In 2010, President Barack Obama fired General Stanley A. McChrystal after McChrystal and his staff made disparaging remarks about senior civilian government officials in an article published in Rolling Stone magazine. This elicited comparisons with MacArthur, as the war in Afghanistan was not going well. On the other hand, Major General James N. Post III was relieved and issued a letter of reprimand in 2015 for discouraging personnel under his command from communicating with the Congress, which he described as "treason".

MacArthur's relief "left a lasting current of popular sentiment that in matters of war and peace, the military really knows best," a philosophy that became known as "MacArthurism". In February 2012, Lieutenant Colonel Daniel L. Davis published a report entitled "Dereliction of Duty II" in which he criticized senior military commanders for misleading Congress about the war in Afghanistan, especially General David Petraeus, noting that:

A message had been learned by the leading politicians of our country, by the vast majority of our uniformed Service Members, and the population at large: David Petraeus is a real war hero—maybe even on the same plane as Patton, MacArthur, and Eisenhower. But the most important lesson everyone learned: never, ever question General Petraeus or you'll be made to look a fool. In the years following, the "Legend of Petraeus" spread and expanded, as these things often do, and he was given increasing credit for the success.

During the 1992 presidential election, Bill Clinton used endorsements from the former chairman of the Joint Chiefs of Staff, Admiral William J. Crowe, and 21 other retired generals and flag officers to counter doubts about his ability to serve as Commander in Chief. This became a feature of later presidential election campaigns. During the 2004 presidential election, twelve retired generals and admirals endorsed Senator John Kerry, including Crowe and the former chief of staff of the Air Force, General Merrill "Tony" McPeak, who also appeared in television advertisements defending Kerry against the Swift Boat Veterans for Truth. During this election campaign, one retired four-star General, Tommy Franks, spoke at the Republican National Convention and another, John Shalikashvili, addressed the Democratic National Convention.

In early 2006, in what was called the "Generals Revolt", six retired generals, Major General John Batiste, Major General Paul D. Eaton, Lieutenant General Gregory Newbold, Major General John M. Riggs, Major General Charles H. Swannack Jr. and General Anthony C. Zinni, called for the resignation of Secretary of Defense Donald Rumsfeld, accusing him of "abysmal" military planning and lack of strategic competence. The ethics of a system under which serving generals felt compelled to publicly support policies that they privately believed were potentially ruinous for the country and cost the lives of military personnel, did not escape critical public comment, and was mocked by political satirist Stephen Colbert at a dinner attended by President George W. Bush and the chairman of the Joint Chiefs of Staff, General Peter Pace. Rumsfeld resigned in November 2006. By 2008, the chairman of the Joint Chiefs of Staff, Admiral Mike Mullen, felt obliged to pen an open letter in which he reminded all servicemen that "The U.S. military must remain apolitical at all times."

== See also ==
- Service summary of Douglas MacArthur
