= Service summary of Douglas MacArthur =

US Army general's service

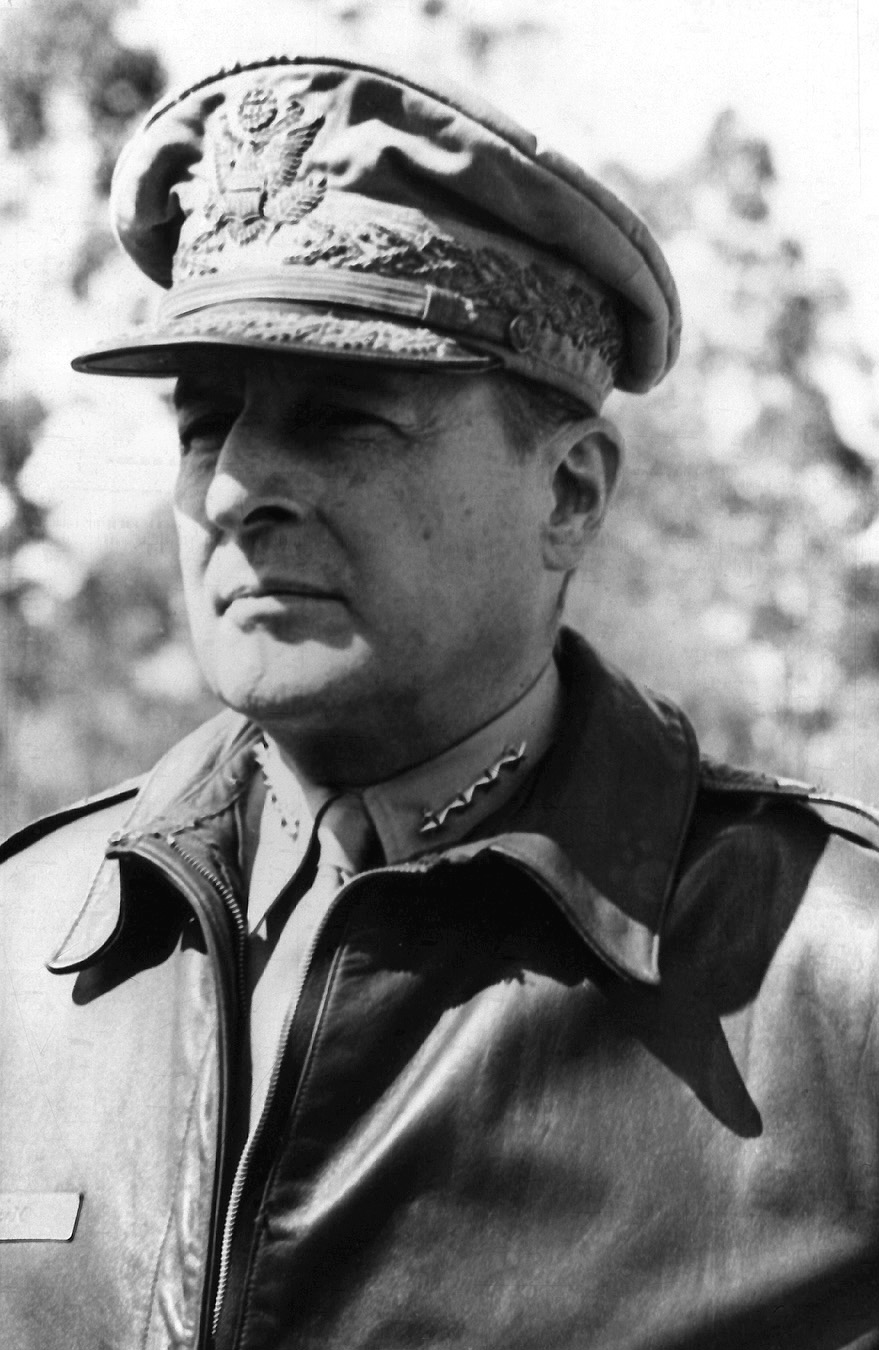
General Douglas MacArthur in 1943 or 1944

Douglas MacArthur (1880–1964) was a General in the United States Army, who began his career in 1903 as a second lieutenant and served in three major military conflicts, going on to hold the highest military offices of both the United States and the Philippines.

== Chronology and summary of military service ==
=== West Point ===
- 13 June 1899 – appointed as a cadet at the United States Military Academy, West Point, New York.
- 1900: Is the victim of hazing and becomes involved in a serious scandal where one cadet is left dead by upperclassman abuse. During the investigation he implicates only cadets who were already expelled from West Point or had previously confessed.
- 11 June 1903 – Graduates first in his class, commissioned as a second lieutenant in the Corps of Engineers

=== Early career ===
- October 1903: Serves with Company I, 3rd Battalion of Engineers in the Philippine Islands.
- November 1903: Ambushed by two Filipino brigands or guerrillas while constructing a wharf in Guimaras. He shot and killed both of them.
- April 1904: Promoted to First Lieutenant.
- November 1904: Becomes assistant to Chief Engineering Officer for the Army Pacific Division in San Francisco, California.
- January 1905: Assigned to the California Debris Commission until October 1905.
- Acting Chief Engineer Officer, Pacific Division, July 1905 to October 1905.
- November 1905: Reports to Tokyo, Japan to serve as an aide to his father (Major General Arthur MacArthur, Jr.) in the Far East. Sees service in numerous locations in the Far East.
- August 1906: Takes three month furlough. Returns to United States.
- November 1906: Assigned to 2nd Engineer Battalion at Washington Barracks.
- December 1906: Serves as aide-de-camp to President Theodore Roosevelt
- August 1907: Attends the Engineering School of Application in Washington, D.C. Graduates 28 February 1908.
- March 1908: Assigned as the Officer-in-Charge (OIC), Improvements Commission, Milwaukee, Wisconsin
- April 1908: Appointed as commanding officer, Company K, 3rd Battalion of Engineers. Later that year becomes an instructor at the Mounted Service School, Fort Riley, Kansas
- April 1909: Becomes Quartermaster for the 3rd Battalion of Engineers.
- 27 February 1911: Promoted to captain and serves as the Officer-in-Charge of the Engineering Depot at Fort Leavenworth, Kansas.
- April 1913: Appointed as superintendent of the State, War, and Navy Building in Washington, D.C.
- 25 September 1913: Assigned to the General Staff Corps, for duty as a member and recorder of the Board of Engineering Troops.
- April 1914: Becomes the assistant engineering officer of the military expedition to Veracruz, Mexico. Conducts an unauthorized reconnaissance mission during which he engages in three gun fights in which he kills a total of seven Mexicans.
- 11 December 1915: Promoted to major, serves as an engineering officer on the Army General Staff.

=== World War I ===
- 10 August 1917: Becomes chief of staff of the 42nd Division and is credited with naming it the "Rainbow Division".
- 11 August 1917: Promoted to the temporary rank of colonel in the National Army. Reports to Camp Mills, Long Island, New York to begin forming the 42nd Division.
- November 1917: Departs U.S. for France and joins the American Expeditionary Force.
- 26 June 1918: Appointed a brigadier general in the National Army and in August is appointed as commander of the 84th Infantry Brigade, which is part of the 42nd Division. Briefly commands the 42nd Division from 10 to 22 November 1918.
- 1918 – 1919: Receives two Distinguished Service Crosses and seven Silver Star Citations (later converted to Silver Stars) for battlefield leadership and bravery and also is wounded in action and gassed by the enemy. Was known for personally leading troops into battle, often without a weapon of his own. Begins to develop a negative relationship with General of the Armies John Pershing, after feeling that Pershing is wasting the lives of his troops with bad military tactics.
- May 1919: Returns to the United States as a hero, but is distraught over the lack of recognition his Rainbow Division receives for actions in France.

=== Inter-war years ===
- 12 June 1919: Becomes the Superintendent of the United States Military Academy, West Point.
- 20 January 1920: Appointed as a brigadier general in the Regular Army. Is one of the few officers who retain their wartime rank. Receives a negative evaluation report from Pershing, now Chief of Staff, who ranks MacArthur 38 out of 45 generals and states that MacArthur has an "exalted view of himself and should remain in his present grade for several years".
- February 1922: Married socialite Louise Cromwell Brooks in Palm Beach, Florida.
- 1 November 1922: Becomes Commanding General, District of Manila, in the Philippines.
- 29 June 1923: While still serving as District of Manila Commander, also becomes commander of the 23rd Infantry Brigade.
- 18 November 1924: Assigned as commander of the Philippine Division.
- 17 January 1925: Promoted to major general, becoming the youngest two-star general in the U.S. Army.
- 1 February 1925: Returns to the United States to become a corps commander.
- 1 May 1925: Assigned as 4th Corps Area Commander, encompassing the southeastern states with headquarters in Atlanta. Quickly reassigned as local residents did not welcome MacArthur because his father was a Union officer during the Civil War.
- 25 July 1925: Relieved of assignment as 4th Corps Area Commander.
- 1 August 1925 – 3 September 1928: Serves as 3rd Corps Area Commander, with headquarters in Baltimore, Maryland.
- November to December 1925: Serves as a member of the court martial of Brigadier General Billy Mitchell.
- 16 September 1927 to 1928: Serves as president of the American Olympic Committee. Leads the United States Olympic Team to Amsterdam in August 1928.
- 1 October 1928: Assigned as the Commanding General of the Philippine Department, with headquarters in Manila.
- 1929: Divorces his wife Louise due to mutual incompatibility.
- 2 October 1930: Becomes the commander of the Ninth Corps Area with headquarters at the Presidio of San Francisco, California.
- 21 November 1930: Appointed by President Hoover as Chief of Staff of the United States Army and promoted to the rank of general on the same date.
- 1931: Proposes the Army General Staff Badge but it is not approved by the War Department until 1933.
- 22 February 1932: Re-establishes the Purple Heart on the 200th anniversary of the birth of George Washington. Previously, wound chevrons were worn on the right sleeve of the uniform.
- 27 February 1932: Installed as the Supreme Paramount Carabao of the Military Order of the Carabao in Washington, D.C.
- June 1932: Presides over the dispersal of the "Bonus Army", deemed a low point of his tenure as Army Chief of Staff.
- 16 July 1932: Establishes the Silver Star decoration for valor in combat to replace the Silver Citation Star which was worn on the appropriate campaign medal.
- 1 October 1935: Completes his tour as chief of staff and declines retirement from the army. Per Army regulations, reverts to his permanent rank of major general.
- October 1935: Meets heiress Jean Faircloth on his voyage to the Philippines.
- 26 October 1935: Arrives in the Philippines and becomes the Chief Military Advisor to the Commonwealth Government of the Philippines. Makes his residence at the Manila Hotel.
- 3 December 1935: Mary Pinkney "Pinkie" Hardy MacArthur (b. 1852) dies in Manila.
- 14 January 1936: Made a Master Mason at Sight by Samuel R. Hawthorne, Grand Master of the Philippines. Becomes a 32nd Degree Mason later that year.
- 24 August 1936: Commissioned as a field marshal in the Philippine Army. Only person to ever hold that rank in the Philippine Army. Begins wearing the "scrambled eggs" cap often associated with his image.
- 30 April 1937: Marries Jean Faircloth in New York City.
- 31 December 1937: Retires from the U.S. Army at his own request. Placed on the retired list as a four-star general.
- 1 January 1938 – 25 July 1941: Civilian adviser to the Philippine Government on military matters.
- 21 February 1938: Son Arthur MacArthur IV is born in Manila.

=== World War II ===
==== 1941-1942 ====
- 26 July 1941: Recalled to active service in the United States Army with the rank of major general and appointed as commanding general of United States Army Forces in the Far East (USAFFE).
- 27 July 1941: Commissioned as a temporary lieutenant general in the Army of the United States.
- 8 December 1941: Japanese invade the Philippines.
- 18 December 1941: Promoted to four star general in the Army of the United States.
- 24 December 1941: Moves headquarters from Manila to Corregidor. Declares Manila an open city.
- December 1941–May 1942; Allied forces retreat to Bataan and Corregidor
- 15 January 1942: $500,000 from the Philippine treasury is deposited by wire into MacArthur's personal bank account. It is a gratuity to MacArthur from Philippine President Manuel Quezon for his services to the Philippines.
- 22 February 1942: Ordered by President Roosevelt to leave the Philippines and go to Australia.
- 12 March 1942: Departs the Philippines by PT boat and later takes a plane from Mindanao to Australia.
- 17 March 1942: Arrives at Batchellor Field in Darwin, Australia.
- 20 March 1942: In Terowie, South Australia, MacArthur promises, "I came out of Bataan and I shall return."
- 21 March 1942: Establishes headquarters of USAFFE in Melbourne, Australia.
- 1 April 1942: Awarded the Medal of Honor by War Department General Order No. 16 for his efforts to defend the Philippines.
- 9 April 1942: Major General Edward P. King surrenders the last American and Filipino forces on the Bataan peninsula.
- 18 April 1942: Appointed Supreme Allied Commander, South West Pacific Area (SWPA) with headquarters in Melbourne. Australian Prime Minister John Curtin gives MacArthur control of the Australian military, which commences the New Guinea campaign. MacArthur also commands American, Dutch and New Zealand forces.
- 6 May 1942: Fall of Corregidor island. Lieutenant General Jonathan Wainwright IV surrenders remaining American and Filipino forces in the Philippines.
- 18 June 1942: Appointed Supreme Allied Commander, South West Pacific Area.
- 21 July 1942: Moves headquarters to the Australian Mutual Provident (AMP) Building in Brisbane, Australia.
- 5 September 1942: I Corps, commanded by Lieutenant General Robert Eichelberger, arrives in Australia and is assigned the 32nd and 41st Infantry Divisions. I Corps serves as the headquarters for US ground forces assigned to SWPA and is initially subordinate to the Australian First Army.
- 15 September 1942: The 126th Infantry Regiment of the 32nd Infantry Division arrives in New Guinea. This marks the beginning of the New Guinea campaign.
- 19 September 1942: Awarded Distinguished Service Medal by the American Legion.
- 6 November 1942: Moves tactical headquarters of SWPA to Port Moresby, New Guinea. Main headquarters remains in Brisbane.
- 16 November 1942 until 22 January 1943: Battle of Buna–Gona. American and Australian forces under MacArthur engaged in a hard-fought campaign eliminated a Japanese stronghold in southwestern New Guinea. Allied casualties were high and much was learned about conducting jungle warfare.

==== 1943 ====
- 16 February 1943: The Sixth United States Army is formed under the command of Lieutenant General Walter Kruger. The Sixth Army serves as the headquarters for all US ground forces in the South West Pacific Area.
- 2-4 March 1943: Battle of the Bismarck Sea. Allied air forces under MacArthur's command sink 8 transports, 4 destroyers and destroy 20 fighter planes with light casualties. The victory greatly reduces Japan's ability to reinforce its forces on New Guinea.
- 30 June 1943 to March 1944: MacArthur implements Operation Cartwheel, consisting of 10 individual operations with the goal of isolating the major Japanese base at Rabaul. The operation is based on the principles of avoiding strongly held areas and using "island hopping" to gain positional advantages.
- 1943 – 1944: Argues with the Joint Chiefs of Staff regarding reconquest of the Philippine Islands. Chiefs propose bypass; MacArthur has a conference with President Roosevelt and Admiral Chester Nimitz in July 1944 to argue for invading the Philippines. Due to logistics issues the Joint Chiefs decided to invade only the southern the Philippine Islands. MacArthur again must fight to convince his superiors to invade the entire Philippine Islands. The Joint Chiefs eventually agree that MacArthur is to lead the invasion the Philippine Islands at Leyte Gulf and strike toward Manila.

==== 1944 ====
- Early 1944: After being approached by Republican Party leaders, considers running for the Republican nomination for the 1944 presidential election.
- 29 March 1944: Invested as a Knight Grand Cross of the Order of the Bath by The Rt Hon The Lord Gowrie VC, GCMG etc., Governor General of Australia.
- 30 April 1944: Issues a statement asking that no action be taken to nominate him for president. He states, "I do not covet it nor would I accept it."
- June 1944: Receives one vote for the presidential nomination at the 1944 Republican National Convention.
- 28 July 1944: Meets with President Roosevelt, Admiral William Leahy and Admiral Chester Nimitz in Honolulu, Hawaii to discuss the alternatives of invading the Philippines or Taiwan prior to an invasion of Japan. MacArthur is successful in convincing Roosevelt to have him lead the invasion of the Philippines.
- 20 October 1944: MacArthur fulfills his promise to return to the Philippines. U.S. forces landed at Leyte and began reconquest of Philippines.
- 18 December 1944: Promoted to the newly created rank of General of the Army becoming second highest ranking active duty officer of the U.S. Army after Army Chief of Staff George Marshall.

==== 1945 ====
- 5 February 1945: Forces under MacArthur's command liberate Manila. Moves headquarters to Manila.
- 7 March 1945: Returns to Corregidor after its recapture.
- 11 March 1945: Awarded the Medal of Valor by the Commonwealth of the Philippines.
- Summer 1945: Begins planning the invasion of Japan (codenamed Operation Downfall) with a tentative starting date of 1 November 1945.
- 26 July 1945: Briefed by Brigadier General Thomas F. Farrell about the atomic bomb.
- 6 August 1945: MacArthur stunned by the news of the use of the atomic bomb to destroy Hiroshima. He is quoted as saying that "this apparatus will make men like me obsolete".
- 14 August 1945: Japan surrenders. MacArthur is appointed Supreme Commander for the Allied Powers (SCAP) and given command of all Allied Forces in Japan.
- 15 August 1945: The Philippine Congress bestows on him honorary citizenship and decrees that his name will be carried in perpetuity on the rolls of the Philippine Army.
- 27 August 1945: Elected as a Compatriot of the Empire State Society of the Sons of the American Revolution.
- 30 August 1945: Arrives in Japan and assumes command of the occupation of Japan and is appointed military governor of Japanese home islands.
- 2 September 1945: Presides over the Japanese surrender ceremony in Tokyo Bay on board the battleship USS Missouri. Threatens the Soviet Union with armed conflict should Red Army soldiers attempt to occupy any part of Japan.
- 2 October 1945: Establishes his headquarters at the Dai Ichi Building in Tokyo.

=== Occupation of Japan ===
- 15 December 1945: Orders the end of Shinto as the state religion of Japan.
- 1945 – 1948: Begins sweeping reforms, drafts a new constitution for Japan granting women the right to vote, and puts an end to centuries of Emperor god-worship.
- 1946: Coroneted as a 33rd Degree Mason at the United States Embassy in Tokyo.
- January 1946: Decides not to prosecute Emperor Hirohito for war crimes because the Emperor was invaluable to MacArthur's efforts to reform Japan.
- 19 January 1946: The International Military Tribunal sits in Tokyo to conduct war crimes trials. MacArthur is given final authority to approve convictions and to carry out sentences.
- 23 March 1946: Permanently promoted to General of the Army.
- 10 April 1946: First free elections in Japan's history. Japanese women vote for the first time.
- 10 May 1946: Visited in Tokyo by Army Chief of Staff Dwight D. Eisenhower. Its the first time the men have met since December 1939.
- 4 July 1946: The Philippines become an independent nation. MacArthur, representing the United States Army, attends the celebration in Manila.
- 14 December 1946: Invested with the Grand Cross of the French Legion of Honor.
- 1 January 1947: Far East Command established with headquarters in Tokyo.
- 3 May 1947: Japan's new constitution, greatly influenced by MacArthur, goes into effect.
- June 1948: Receives 11 votes for the presidential nomination at the 1948 Republican National Convention.
- 9 July 1948: Returned to the active list of the Regular Army. He had officially been a retired officer on active duty since 26 July 1941.

=== Korean War ===
- 1950: Elected an honorary member of the New York Society of the Cincinnati.
- 21 June 1950: Meets with future Secretary of State John Foster Dulles in Tokyo.
- 25 June 1950: Invasion by North Korea into South Korea.
- 8 July 1950: Named Commander-in-Chief of United Nations Command and takes command of all United Nations forces in Korea.
- 31 July 1950: Travels to Taiwan and conducts diplomacy with Generalissimo Chiang Kai-shek.
- 15 September 1950: Leads UN forces at the invasion at Inchon, which is seen as one of the greatest military operations in history.
- 1 October 1950: Calls on North Korean forces to lay down their arms.
- 15 October 1950: Meets with President Truman on Wake Island after heavy disagreements develop regarding the conduct of the Korean War. When meeting Truman, it is very noticeable that MacArthur does not salute his Commander-in-Chief but rather offers a handshake. Truman awards MacArthur a fourth oak leaf cluster on his Distinguished Service Medal.
- 19 October 1950: China intervenes in North Korea with 200,000 troops.
- November – December 1950: With China committed to all-out war against the US on the Korean peninsula, MacArthur advocates for the same in return against China but is prohibited. He is outraged when military leaders in Washington restrict the war to only the Korean theater, meaning that he cannot bomb even the bridges of the Yalu river over which Chinese troops, supplies, and material are streaming across. He is further restricted from bombing their bases in Manchuria. MacArthur expressed his outrage later, saying that "The order not to bomb the Yalu bridges was the most indefensible and ill-conceived decision ever forced on a field commander in our nation's history."
- 25 March 1951: MacArthur is directed to clear his press releases with Washington prior to making them public.
- 5 April 1951: Republican Congressman Joseph Martin reads a letter written to him by MacArthur on 20 March 1951 to the House of Representatives. In the letter MacArthur supports Martin's view that Chinese Nationalist forces should be employed in the Korean War. This position is in conflict with the policies of the Truman administration.
- 10 April 1951: President Truman meets with senior officials regarding, in Truman's opinion, MacArthur's insubordination. It is decided that MacArthur should be relieved of command of United Nations forces in Korea.
- 11 April 1951: After several public criticisms of White House policy in Korea, which were seen as undercutting the Commander-in-Chief's position, President Truman removes MacArthur from command and orders him to return to the United States. Some suggest Truman may have exchanged MacArthur for a sound nuclear policy in Korea since he did not trust "Brass Hat MacArthur" with nuclear weapons. Some disagree with this, however, since MacArthur later came out against Truman's use of the bomb against Japan and there seems to be no concrete evidence of a major change in his views. MacArthur's commands are turned over to Lieutenant General Matthew B. Ridgway.
- 8 September 1951: Peace treaty with Japan signed. Position of Supreme Commander for the Allied Powers (SCAP) abolished.

=== Later life ===
- 19 April 1951: At a farewell address before the United States Congress, MacArthur gives his famous "Old Soldiers Never Die" speech.
- April 1951: Awarded Gold Commemorative Medal by New York City.
- 20 April 1951: Honored with a ticker tape parade in New York City.
- 25 April 1951: Addresses a crowd of 50,000 at Soldier Field in Chicago.
- 27 April 1951: Visits Milwaukee, Wisconsin and accepts honorary degree from Marquette University.
- 28 April 1951: Awarded Distinguished Service Citizens Medal by the Veterans of Foreign Wars.
- 1 May 1951: Awarded Gold Good Citizenship Medal by the Sons of the American Revolution.
- 3-5 May 1951: Appears before the Senate committees on Foreign Relations and Armed Services. MacArthur answers questions about the conduct of the Korean War and his relief from command. The hearings continue until 27 June 1951.
- May 1951: Retires a second time from the U.S. Army, but is listed as permanently on active duty due to the regulations regarding those who hold the rank of General of the Army. For administrative reasons, he is assigned in absentee to the office of the Army Chief of Staff and has an office at the federal office building at 90 Church Street in Manhattan. Makes his residence at the Waldorf Astoria Hotel.
- 13 June 1951: Addresses the Texas State Legislature in Austin. Warns against a policy of appeasement.
- 25 July 1951: Addresses the Massachusetts State Legislature in Boston. He states that it is a dangerous concept for members of the military to owe their primary allegiance to those in temporary authority in the executive branch of government rather than to their country and its Constitution.
- 17 October 1951: Addresses the National Convention of the American Legion in Miami, Florida.
- 1952: Allows name to be placed on primary ballots for Republican nomination, but does not campaign or announce as a candidate.
- July 1952: Delivers the keynote address at the 1952 Republican National Convention. Senator Robert Taft promises supporters to name MacArthur as candidate for vice president, but Taft loses to nomination to Eisenhower on the 1st ballot. MacArthur received 10 votes on the 1st ballot before shifts and only 4 votes after shifts.
- 1952: Nominated for president, without his consent, by both the Constitution Party and the America First Party, with Senator Harry F. Byrd as the nominee for vice president. Receives 17,205 votes nationwide.
- 1952: Accepts position as chairman of the board of directors of Remington Rand Corporation.
- 17 December 1952: At the request of President-elect Eisenhower, MacArthur meets with him and Secretary of State designate John Foster Dulles at the Waldorf Astoria to discuss MacArthur's suggestions for ending the Korean War. This is the first meeting between the two in six years.
- 18 March 1954: Meets with President Eisenhower at the White House.
- 1955: Is considered for promotion to the rank of General of the Armies. The promotion does not take place, various difficulties having arisen.
- 30 July 1957: Addresses stockholders meeting of the Sperry Rand Corporation. Comments on the negative economic impact of taxation.
- 1959: The MacArthur Bowl trophy is established. It is a trophy awarded annually by the National Football Foundation (NFF) (owners and operators of the College Football Hall of Fame) to the NCAA Division I Football Bowl Subdivision college football team(s) that are recognized by the NFF as the National Champions for that season.
- 1 December 1959: Addresses Football Hall of Fame dinner in New York City.
- 1960: Active in U.S. Olympic affairs.
- 21 June 1960: Invested with the Grand Cordon with Paulownia Flowers of the Japanese Order of the Rising Sun.(Became Order of the Paulownia Flowers in 2003.) This makes MacArthur one of the few generals in history to be honored by a country he fought against.
- 10 January 1961: Invested as Chief Commander of the Philippine Legion of Honor.
- 28 April 1961: Meets with President John F. Kennedy at the Waldorf Astoria hotel.
- 6 June 1961: Arthur MacArthur IV graduates from Columbia University. He lives a reclusive adult life in New York City under an assumed name.
- 4 July 1961: Visits the Philippines on the fifteenth anniversary of its independence. This is his last public appearance in uniform.
- 20 July 1961: Meets with President Kennedy at the White House.
- 1961: Awarded an honorary Combat Infantryman Badge by Army Chief of Staff General George H. Decker. During World War II, Decker served as chief of staff of the Sixth United States Army, which was a major element under MacArthur's command.
- 12 May 1962: Gives famous Duty, Honor, Country speech at West Point upon accepting the Sylvanus Thayer Award granted by the West Point Association of Graduates.
- 25 May 1962: Awarded Silver Buffalo Award from the Boy Scouts of America.
- 20 July 1962: Awarded the Thanks of Congress by unanimous vote.
- 16 August 1962: Meets with President Kennedy at the White House.
- 9 October 1962: Awarded Congressional Gold Medal.
- 30 September 1963: Awarded the Grand Lodge of the State of New York Distinguished Achievement Award by Freemasonry.

=== Illness and death ===
- 2 March 1964: Goes to Walter Reed Army Hospital for a checkup due to stomach pains.
- 6 March 1964: Has surgery for removal of his gallbladder and of gallstones, which had been causing obstructive jaundice.
- March 1964: Visited by President Lyndon Johnson while recovering from surgery.
- 5 April 1964: General of the Army Douglas MacArthur dies of liver and kidney failure following gallbladder surgery at Walter Reed Army Hospital in Washington, D.C. President Johnson orders all US flags be flown at half staff until after MacArthur's burial.
- 7 April 1964: Lies in honor at the Seventh Regiment Armory in New York City.
- 8-9 April 1964: Lies in state at the United States Capitol rotunda in Washington, D.C. Eulogies are given by the chaplains of the House and Senate and President Johnson lays a wreath on MacArthur's casket. Admiral of the Navy George Dewey and General of the Armies John Pershing are the only other military officers who were not presidents or senators to have lain in state at the Capitol.
- 11 April 1964: Interred at the MacArthur Memorial in Norfolk, Virginia.
- 26 January 1971: US Postal Service issues a 6 cent stamp in honor of MacArthur.
- 22 January 2000: Jean MacArthur dies in New York City and is buried next to her husband.
- 23 September 2017: Posthumously receives the George Washington Distinguished Medal of Service from the Grand Master of Masons in Virginia.

== Assignments ==
=== Early career ===
- Cadet, United States Military Academy, 13 June 1899 to 11 June 1903
- Graduated and commissioned as a Second Lieutenant, Corps of Engineers, 11 June 1903
- At Guimaras Island, P. I., with Company I, 3d Battalion of Engineers, October 1903 to November 1904
- Assistant to the Engineer Officer, Department of the Visayas, Iloilo, P. I., October 1903 to March, 1904
- Disbursing Officer and Assistant to the Chief Engineer Officer, Philippines Division, Manila, P. I., 27 February 1904 to October, 1904
- Assistant to Lieutenant Colonel T. H. Handbury, Corps of Engineers, San Francisco, California, November 1904 to April 1905
- California Debris Commission, January 1905 to October 1905
- Assistant to Colonel W. H. Heuer, Corps of Engineers, San Francisco, Cal., April 1905 to October 1905
- Acting Chief Engineer Officer, Pacific Division, July 1905 to October 1905
- Aide-de‑Camp to Commanding General, Pacific Division, October 1905 to September 1906
- Confidential duty in Japan, China, Siam, Java, Malay States, Burma, India and Ceylon, November 1905 to August 1906
- 2d Battalion of Engineers, Washington Barracks, D. C., November 1906 to August 1907
- Aide-de‑Camp to President Theodore Roosevelt, December 1906 to August 1907
- Assistant to Major W. V. Judson, Corps of Engineers, Milwaukee, Wisconsin, August 1907 to April 1908
- In charge of improvements to the harbors of Manitowoc, Two‑Rivers and Sheboygan, Wisconsin, November 1907 to April, 1908
- Graduate of Engineer School of Application, 28 February 1908
- Commanding Company K, 3d Battalion of Engineers, Fort Leavenworth, Kansas, April, 1908 to circa 1910
- Fort Leavenworth, Kansas, commanding Battalion, and Battalion Adjutant and Instructor, Army Service Schools, April, 1908 to November, 1912
- Participated in mobilization of Maneuver Division at San Antonio, Texas, March to July 1911
- At Washington, D. C., member and recorder of Board of Engineer Troops, November 1912, to May 1913
- Assigned to General Staff Corps, May to September, 1913
- Superintendent of State, War and Navy Building and member of General Staff, 25 September 1913 to 11 December 1915
- Participated in Vera Cruz Expedition, April to September 1914
- Attached to U.S. Army General Staff, 11 December 1915 to 7 April 1916
- Member of U.S. Army General Staff, 7 April 1916 to 10 August 1917

=== Mid career ===
- Chief of Staff, 42nd Division - 10 August 1917 to 26 June 1918
- Commander, 84th Infantry Brigade, 42d Division - 26 June 1918 to 12 April 1919
- Acting Commander, 42nd Division - 10 November 1918 to 22 November 1918
- Superintendent, United States Military Academy - 12 June 1919 to 30 June 1922
- Commander, District of Manila - 1 November 1922 to 29 June 1923
- Commander, 23rd Infantry Brigade, Philippine Division - 29 June 1923 to 17 January 1925
- Commander, Philippine Division - 18 November 1924 to 30 January 1925
- Commander, Fourth Corps Area, Atlanta, Georgia - 1 May 1925 to 26 July 1925
- Commander, Third Corps Area, Baltimore, Maryland - 1 August 1925 to 3 September 1928
- Commander, Philippine Department - 1 October 1928 to September 1930
- Commander, Ninth Corps Area, San Francisco, California - 2 October 1930 to 20 November 1930
- Chief of Staff, United States Army - 21 November 1930 to 1 October 1935
- Chief Military Advisor to the Philippines - 26 October 1935 to 26 July 1941 (Held position as a retired officer from 1 January 1938.)

=== Late career (World War II and Korea) ===
- Commanding General, United States Army Forces in the Far East (USAFFE) - 26 July 1941 to 4 July 1945
- Commander, Philippine Department - 1 November 1941 to 21 March 1942
- Supreme Allied Commander, South West Pacific Area (SWPA) - 18 April 1942 to 2 September 1945
- Commander in Chief, United States Army Forces in the Pacific (AFPAC) - 6 April 1945 to 31 December 1946
- Supreme Commander for the Allied Powers (SCAP), Japan - 14 August 1945 to 11 April 1951
- Commander in Chief, Far East Command - 1 January 1947 to 11 April 1951
- Commander in Chief, United Nations Command, Korea - 8 July 1950 to 11 April 1951

== Dates of rank ==
Insignia	Rank	Component	Date
None	Cadet	United States Military Academy	13 June 1899
No pin insignia in 1903	Second Lieutenant, Engineers	Regular Army	11 June 1903
	First Lieutenant, Engineers	Regular Army	23 April 1904
	Captain, Engineers	Regular Army	27 February 1911
	Major, Engineers	Regular Army	11 December 1915
	Colonel, Infantry	National Army	11 August 1917 (Date of rank: 5 August 1917.)
	Brigadier General	National Army	11 July 1918 (Date of rank: 26 June 1918.)
	Brigadier General	Regular Army	28 February 1920 (Date of rank: 20 January 1920.)
	Major General	Regular Army	17 January 1925
	General	Temporary	21 November 1930
	Major General	Regular Army	1 October 1935 (Reverted to permanent rank.)
	General	Retired list	1 January 1938
	Major General	Regular Army	26 July 1941 (Recalled to active duty.)
	Lieutenant General	Army of the United States	27 July 1941
	General	Army of the United States	22 December 1941 (Date of rank: 16 September 1936.)
	General of the Army	Army of the United States	18 December 1944
	General of the Army	Regular Army	23 March 1946

In 1955, legislation was in the early stages of consideration by the United States Congress which would have authorized the President of the United States to promote Douglas MacArthur to the rank of General of the Armies. A similar measure had also been proposed unsuccessfully by Stuart Symington in 1945. However, because of several complications which would arise if such a promotion were to take place, the bill was withdrawn.

== Orders, decorations and medals ==
Throughout his career, Douglas MacArthur earned nearly 100 military awards and national honors including:

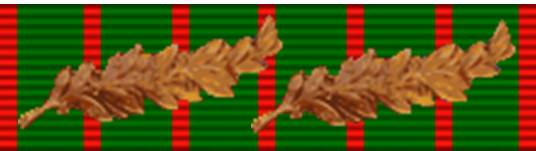

Combat Infantryman Badge (honorary)
Medal of Honor	Distinguished Service Cross with two bronze oak leaf clusters	Army Distinguished Service Medal with four oak leaf clusters

Navy Distinguished Service Medal	Silver Star with six oak leaf clusters	Distinguished Flying Cross	Bronze Star with "V" device
Air Medal	Purple Heart with oak leaf cluster	Philippine Campaign Medal	Mexican Service Medal
World War I Victory Medal with five battle clasps	Army of Occupation of Germany Medal	American Defense Service Medal with "Foreign Service" clasp	Asiatic-Pacific Campaign Medal with arrowhead device and two silver campaign stars
World War II Victory Medal	Army of Occupation Medal with "Japan" clasp	National Defense Service Medal with bronze oak leaf cluster	Korean Service Medal with arrowhead device and three bronze campaign stars
Knight Grand Cross; Order of the Bath (Military Division) (United Kingdom)	Grand Cross; Legion of Honour (France)	Grand Cross; Order of the Crown (Belgium)	Chief Commander; Philippine Legion of Honor
Grand Cordon; Order of the Crown of Italy	Grand Cross; Military Order of the White Lion (Czechoslovakia)	Grand Cross; Order of Polonia Restituta (Poland)	Grand Cross with Swords; Order of Orange Nassau (Netherlands)
Grand Cross with swords Order of the White Eagle (Yugoslavia)	Order of the Rising Sun with Paulownia Flowers (Japan)	Knight Grand Cross; Military Order of Italy	Special Grand Cordon; Order of Pao Ting (Precious Tripod) (Nationalist China)
Knight Grand Cross; Hungarian Order of Merit (Military Division)	Grand Cross; National Order of Faithful Service (Romania)	Taegeuk Cordon of the Order of Military Merit (Republic of Korea)	Grand Cross; Order of Carlos Manuel de Céspedes (Cuba)
Star of Abdon Calderon, First Class (Ecuador)	Commander, Order of Sikatuna (Philippines)	Military Cross, 1st class (Belgium)	Philippine Medal for Valor
Médaille militaire (France)	Croix de Guerre (1914–1918) with two bronze palms and gilt star (France)	Croix de Guerre (1939–1945) with bronze palm (France)	Croix de Guerre (1914–1918) with bronze palm (Belgium)
Distinguished Conduct Star (Philippines)	War Merit Cross (Italy)	Virtuti Militari, V Class (Poland)	War Cross, 3rd class (Greece)
Mexican Medal of Military Merit (1st class)	Cross of Military Merit, First Class (Guatemala)	Philippine Defense Medal with one bronze campaign star	Philippine Liberation Medal with two bronze campaign stars
Philippine Independence Medal	United Nations Korea Medal	Pacific Star (United Kingdom)	Korean War Service Medal (Republic of Korea) (posthumous)

U.S. Army Presidential Unit Citation with three oak leaf clusters	Philippine Presidential Unit Citation	Republic of Korea Presidential Unit Citation

Note 1 - General MacArthur received every U.S. Army decoration and service medal which he was potentially eligible for except for the Legion of Merit.

Note 2 - General MacArthur was awarded a total of 14 overseas service insignias - 3 gold chevrons for World War I, 9 overseas service bars for World War II and 2 for the Korean War.

== Civil awards ==
In addition to the military awards and national honors listed above, General MacArthur received numerous other honors and awards. Below is a partial listing.

- Army and Navy Club Gold Medal (1935)
- American Legion Distinguished Service Medal (1942)
- Boy Scouts of America Silver Buffalo Award (1946)
- Theodore Roosevelt Memorial Roosevelt Medal (1946)
- Gallup's Most Admired Person/Man (1946, 1947, 1951)
- Sons of the American Revolution Gold Good Citizenship Medal (1951)
- Veterans of Foreign Wars Citizens Distinguished Service Medal (1951)
- National Institute of Social Sciences Gold Medal (1951)
- National Football Foundation Gold Medal (1959)
- Order of Lafayette Freedom Medal (1961)
- United States Military Academy Sylvanus Thayer Award (1962)
- Thanks of Congress (1962)
- Congressional Gold Medal (1962)
- Freemasons Distinguished Achievement Medal (1963)
- South Korea - Order of Merit for National Foundation (1964)

General MacArthur appeared on the cover of Time magazine a total of eight times. He was also featured on the cover of Life magazine six times. In addition, his trademark "scrambled eggs" hat appeared on the cover of Life magazine following his death in 1964.

== Memberships ==
General MacArthur belonged to several military and hereditary societies including the Society of the Cincinnati (elected an honorary member of the New York Society in 1950), Military Order of the Loyal Legion of the United States (insignia number 15,317), Sons of Union Veterans of the Civil War, Sons of the American Revolution (accepted by the Empire State Society on 27 August 1945, and assigned national membership number 65,843 and state membership number 7,723), Military Order of Foreign Wars, Military Order of the World Wars (of which he served as national commander in 1928), Order of Lafayette, Veterans of Foreign Wars, and the American Legion (member of Post 23 in Milwaukee, Wisconsin). MacArthur was installed as the Supreme Paramount Carabao of the Military Order of the Carabao at its annual meeting in Washington, D.C., on 27 February 1932.

In 1942 he received the American Legion's Distinguished Service Medal. On 13 October 1951, he was elected an honorary national president of the Society of American Legion Founders.

MacArthur was also eligible for membership in Sons of the Revolution, Society of Colonial Wars and the Order of the Indian Wars of the United States, however, his membership in these organizations has not been confirmed.

On 17 January 1936, MacArthur was made a Freemason at sight by Samuel Hawthorne, Grand Master of Masons in the Philippines in a two-hour ceremony. After being raised to the degree of Master Mason, MacArthur joined Manila Lodge No.1. On 19 October 1937, he was elected Knight Commander Court of Honor, and on 8 December 1947, he was coroneted to the honorary 33rd Degree at the American Embassy in Tokyo. He was also a life member of the Nile Shrine in Seattle, Washington.

== See also ==
- Douglas MacArthur
- Relief of Douglas MacArthur
- Douglas MacArthur's escape from the Philippines
