= War Merit Cross (Italy) =

War Merit Cross Croce al Merito di Guerra
- War Merit Cross
- Awarded for: One year of service in combat operations Being wounded in combat
- Presented by: Italy
- Eligibility: Members of the Italian armed forces
- Established: 19 January 1918
- Ribbon bar of the cross Ribbon bar of the cross for two awards

Precedence
- Next (higher): War Cross of Military Valor
- Next (lower): Army Merit Cross

The War Merit Cross (Italian: Croce al Merito di Guerra) is an Italian military decoration. It was instituted by King Victor Emmanuel III during World War I on 19 January 1918. The award received major changes during World War II and currently is issued by the Italian Republic as well.

== Eligibility ==
The Italian War Merit Cross was awarded to members of the armed forces with a minimum of one year's service in contact with an enemy, or who received the Medal of the Wounded, or to those who, when mentioned for war merit, received a promotion. Also, if an act of valour was deemed insufficient for the Medal of Military Valor, the War Merit Cross could be awarded instead; from 1922 onwards a bronze sword on the ribbon showed this class of award.

From its institution until 30 May 1927, 1,034,924 Crosses were issued.

== Design ==
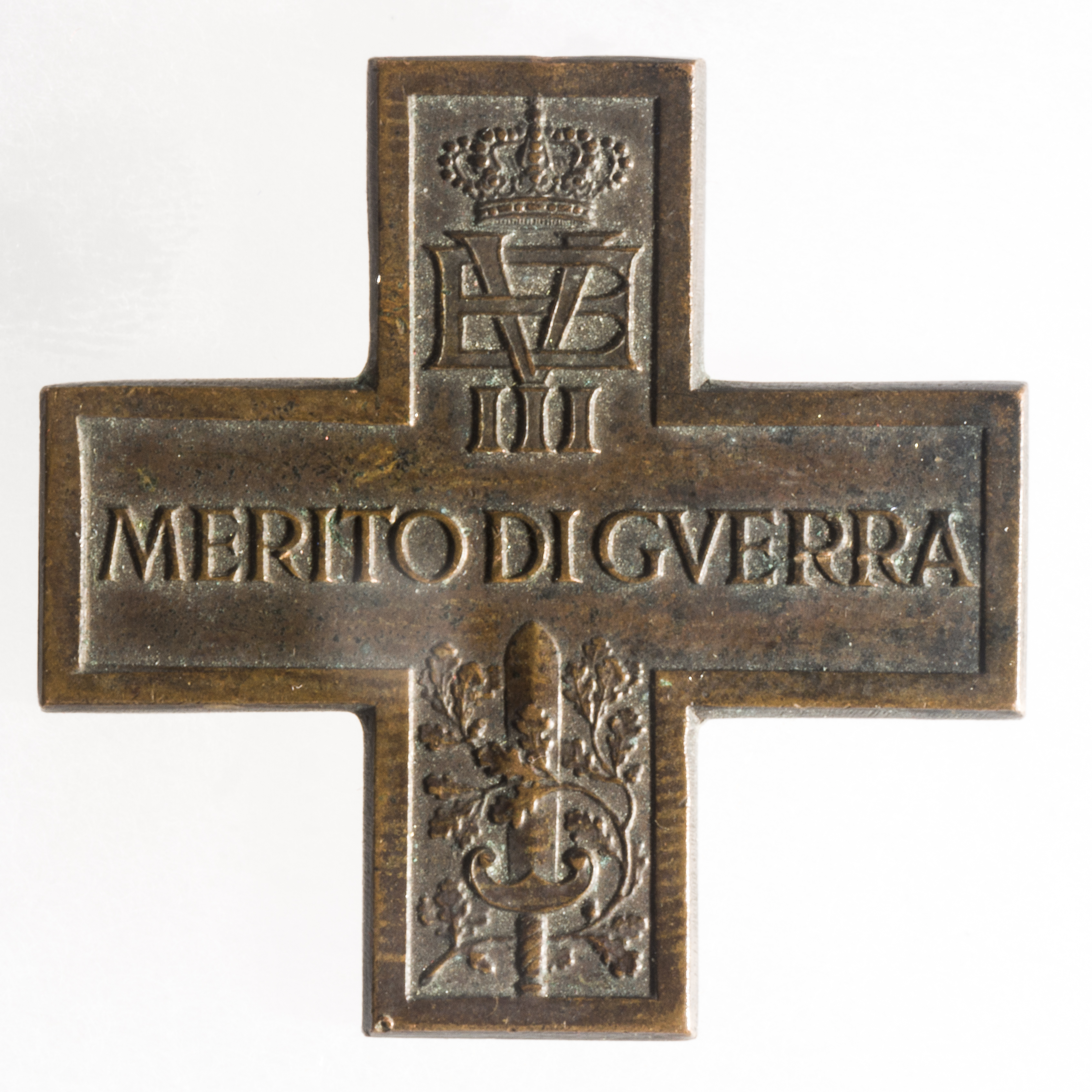
War Merit Cross version awarded in the Kingdom of Italy

The War Merit Cross was in bronze, 38mm wide (1-1/2 inches). The reverse side bears a 5-pointed star on a background of rays. The obverse has the royal cypher ("VE III" under a crown) in the upper arm, "MERITO DI GVERRA" (War Merit) on the horizontal arms and a Roman sword point upwards, on oak leaves, in the lower arm. The ribbon is blue with white stripes. While the latter originally were five, within months they were reduced to two white stripes. Successive awards, three awardings per person being the maximum, were indicated by one or two bronze royal crowns. During World War II, the War Merit Cross underwent a number of significant changes. The number of awards was limited to ten, indicated by a combination of bronze, silver and gold crowns. The medal received another change under the Italian Republic in 1947, the royal cypher being replaced by the intertwined letters "RI" for Repubblica Italiana. Limited to three awardings once again, with one cross or bar for every war allowed, multiple awards were shown by bronze stars. In the current form multiple awards are shown by silver stars.

== Notable recipients ==
- Robert L. Blackwell, Private, US Army, MoH
- Tasker H. Bliss, General, US Army
- Inigo Campioni. Lieutenant Commander (later Admiral), Italian Navy
- Evans Carlson, Brigadier General, US Marines, leader of Carlson's Raiders
- Giuseppe Cirrincione, Maresciallo Dell'aeronautica
- William Alexander Cunningham, Captain 321st Battalion US Army, Awarded January 19, 1918, n205
- William J. Donovan, Major General, US Army, MoH
- Gino De Giorgi (twice), Admiral, Italian Navy
- Ernest Hemingway
- Richmond H. Hilton, Sergeant, US Army, MoH
- Edouard Izac, Lieutenant, US Navy, MoH, Representative from California
- Clayton P. Kerr, United States Army Major General and member of Allied Mission to Italian Army in World War II
- Frank Luke, Jr., Second Lieutenant, US Army Air Service, MoH
- Douglas MacArthur, General, US Army, MoH
- Richard W. O'Neill, 2nd Lieutenant, US Army, MoH
- Carioti Quinto, Private, Italian Army
- Thomas Sheppard, British Army officer
- Milan Rastislav Štefánik, Czechoslovak general
- Sebastiano Visconti Prasca, General, Italian Army
- George H. Weems, United States Army Brigadier General, DSC
- Alvin York, Sergeant, US Army, MoH
- Mohammad Reza Shah Pahlavi
