= Wake Island Conference =

1950 Korean War conference

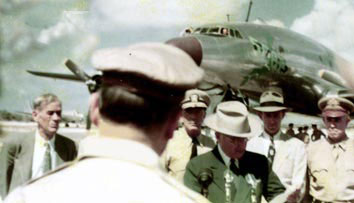
President Truman reads an award citation to General Douglas MacArthur following their meeting at Wake Island. From left to right: Press Secretary Charles Ross, General Douglas MacArthur (foreground with back to camera), Commander in Chief Pacific Admiral Arthur Radford, President Truman, Secretary of the Army Frank Pace, and Chairman of the Joint Chiefs General Omar Bradley. October 15, 1950.

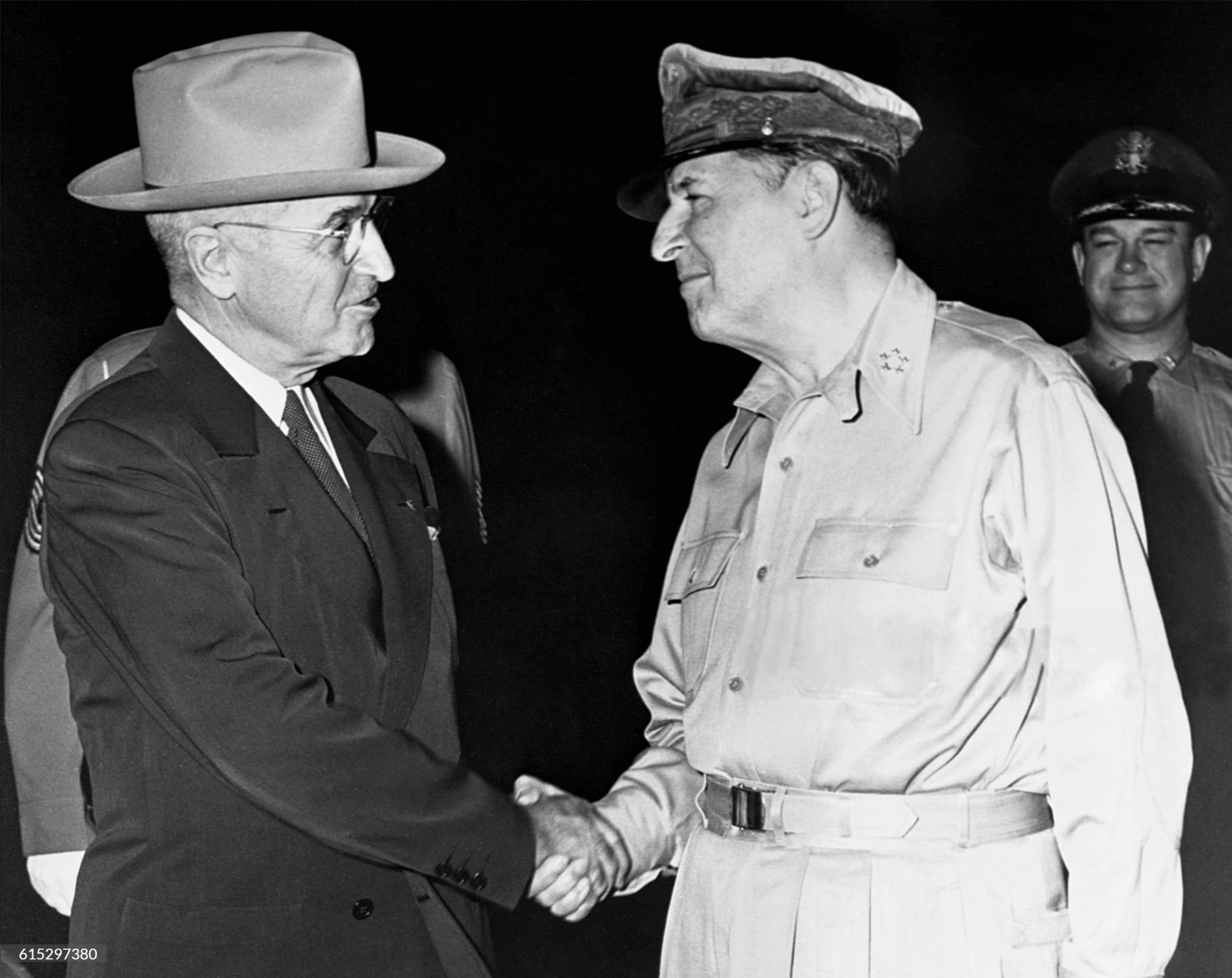
General of the Army MacArthur greets President Truman at the conference.

On October 15, 1950, U.S. President Harry S. Truman and General Douglas MacArthur met on Wake Island to confer about the progress of the Korean War. Truman decided he would meet MacArthur at Wake Island, "so that General MacArthur would not have to be away from the troops in the field for long." The conference was to be the only time that Truman and MacArthur would ever meet face to face.

During the conference Truman presented MacArthur with his fifth and final Army Distinguished Service Medal. MacArthur's record of being awarded the Army Distinguished Service Medal five times has been equaled only by Dwight D. Eisenhower.

Truman and MacArthur met privately at the conference and, therefore, there is no record of their conversation. Although the antagonism between the two men is now well known, it is not known what effect, if any, the conference had on their relationship.

On October 30, 1950, MacArthur wrote to Truman:

"I left the Wake Island conference with a distinct sense of satisfaction that the country's interests had been well served through the better mutual understanding and exchange of views which it afforded. I hope it will result in building a strong defense against future efforts of those who seek for one reason or another (none of them worthy) to breach the understanding between us."

Despite the understanding achieved between Truman and MacArthur on Wake Island, their agreement would be short lived. They would quickly regress into disagreement with each other over policy in Korea, ultimately resulting in Truman's dismissal of MacArthur.

== See also ==
- Relief of Douglas MacArthur
