= Bali =

Province in Lesser Sunda Islands, Indonesia

- Province
- Province of Bali; Provinsi Bali
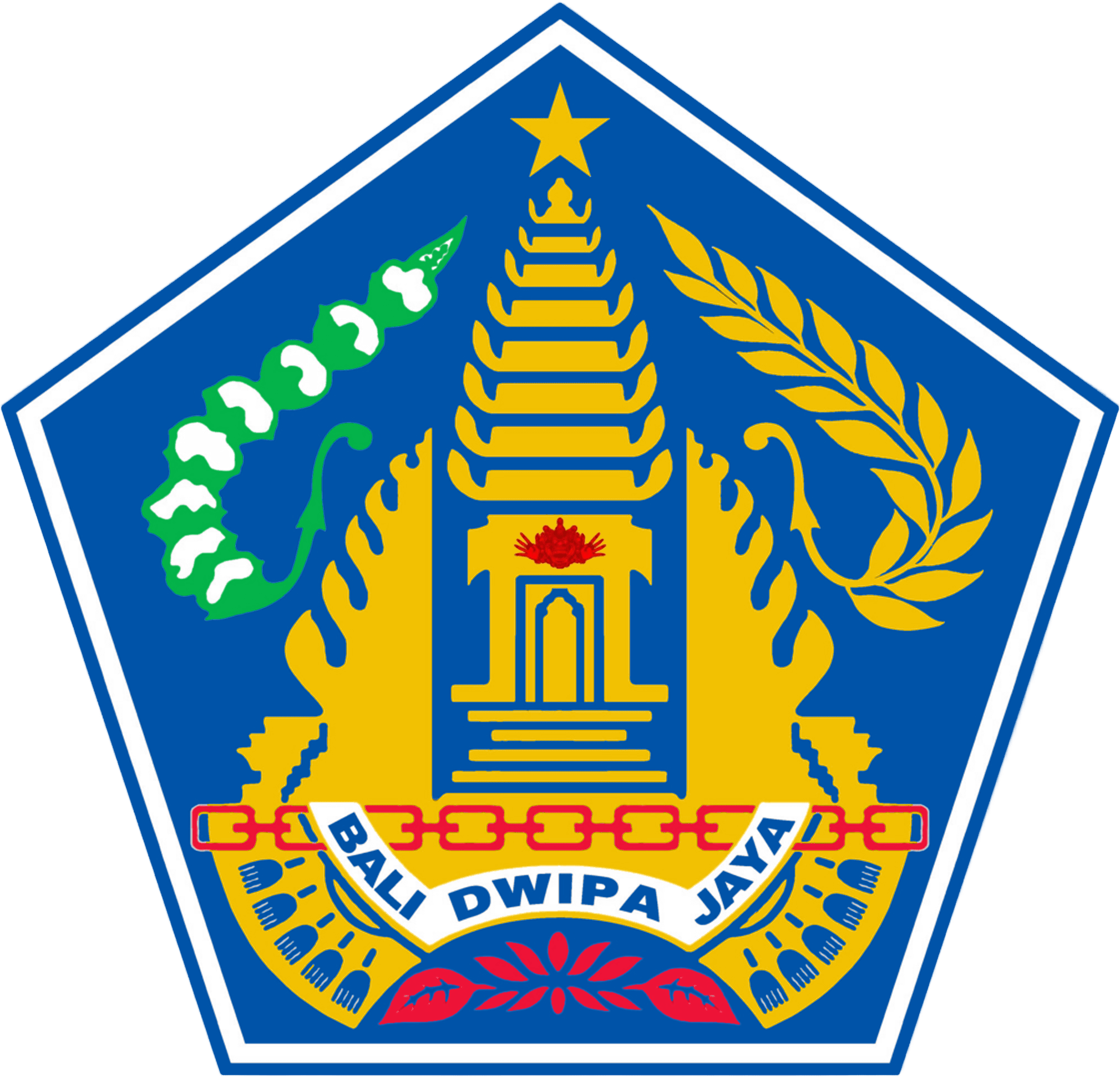
- Coat of arms
- Nicknames: Pulau Dewata "Island of the Gods"; Pulau Seribu Pura "Island of a Thousand Temples" (Note: Other like the Paradise Island and The Last Paradise)
- Motto: Bali Dwipa Jaya (Balinese) (Note: Written in a mixture of Sanskrit and Balineseized Sanskrit Dvīpa —> Dwipa ('island')) ᬩᬮᬶᬤ᭄ᬯᬷᬧᬚᬬ "Victorious Bali Island"
- Bali in Indonesia
- Interactive map of Bali
- Coordinates: 8°20′06″S 115°05′17″E
- Country: Indonesia
- Region: Lesser Sunda Islands (Eastern Indonesia)
- Regencies and cities: List: Jembrana; Tabanan; Badung; Gianyar; Klungkung; Bangli; Karangasem; Buleleng; Denpasar
- Established: 14 August 1958
- Capital and largest city: Denpasar

Government
  - Body: Bali Provincial Government
  - Governor: I Wayan Koster (PDI-P)
  - Vice Governor: I Nyoman Giri Prasta
  - Legislature: Bali Regional House of Representatives (DPRD)

Area
  - Total: 5,582.83 km^{2} (2,155.54 sq mi)
  - Rank: 36th in Indonesia
- Highest elevation (Mount Agung): 3,031 m (9,944 ft)

Population (mid 2025 estimate)
  - Total: 4,461,260
  - Rank: 16th in Indonesia
  - Density: 799.104/km^{2} (2,069.67/sq mi)
- Demonyms: Balinese

Demographics
  - Ethnic groups (2010): 85.97% Balinese; 9.60% Javanese; 4.43% others
  - Religion (2024): 86.40% Hinduism; 10.28% Islam; 2.62% Christianity; 1.76% Protestantism; 0.86% Catholicism; 0.68% Buddhism; 0.02% other
  - Languages: Indonesian (official); Balinese (native); Balinese Malay; other
- Time zone: UTC+08 (WITA)
- ISO 3166 code: ID-BA
- Vehicle registration: DK
- GDP (nominal): 2022
- Total: Rp 245.2 trillion (19th); US$ 16.5 billion Int$ 51.5 billion (PPP)
- Per capita: Rp 55.5 million (20th); US$ 3,741; Int$ 11,673 (PPP)
- Growth: ▲4.84%
- HDI (2024): ▲0.786 (5th) – high
- Website: baliprov.go.id

UNESCO World Heritage Site
- Official name: Cultural Landscape of Bali Province: the Subak System as a Manifestation of the Tri Hita Karana Philosophy
- Criteria: Cultural: (iii), (v), (vi)
- Reference: 1194
- Inscription: 2012 (36th Session)
- Area: 19,519.9 ha (48,235 acres)
- Buffer zone: 1,454.8 ha (3,595 acres)

Bali (English: /ˈbɑːli/; Indonesian: ['bali]; Balinese: ᬩᬮᬶ) is an Indonesian island and province and the westernmost of the Lesser Sunda Islands. East of Java and west of Lombok, the province includes the island of Bali and a few smaller offshore islands, notably Nusa Penida, Nusa Lembongan, and Nusa Ceningan to the southeast. The provincial capital, Denpasar, is the most populous city in the Lesser Sunda Islands and the second-largest, after Makassar, in Eastern Indonesia. The Denpasar metropolitan area is the extended metropolitan area around Denpasar. The upland town of Ubud in Greater Denpasar is considered as Bali's cultural center. The province is Indonesia's main tourist destination, with a significant rise in tourism since the 1980s, and has become the country's area of overtourism. Tourism-related business makes up 80% of the Bali economy.

The island is considered a tourist hotspot. Bali is the only Hindu-majority province in Indonesia, with 86.40% of the population adhering to Balinese Hinduism. It is renowned for its highly developed arts, including traditional and modern dance, sculpture, painting, leather, metalworking, and music. The Indonesian International Film Festival is held every year in Bali. Other international events that have been held in Bali include Miss World 2013, the 2018 Annual Meetings of the International Monetary Fund and the World Bank Group, and the 2022 G20 summit. In March 2017, Tripadvisor named Bali as the world's top destination in its Traveler's Choice award, which it earned once again in January 2021 and 2026.

Bali is part of the Coral Triangle, an area with high diversity of marine species, mainly fish and turtles. In this area alone, more than 500 reef-building coral species can be found. For comparison, this is about seven times as many as in the entire Caribbean. Bali is the home of the Subak irrigation system, a UNESCO World Heritage Site. It is also home to a unified confederation of kingdoms composed of 10 traditional royal Balinese houses, each house ruling a specific geographic area. The confederation is the successor of the Bali Kingdom. The royal houses, which originated before Dutch colonisation, are not recognised by the government of Indonesia.

== Etymology ==
The name Bali is attested in ancient Balinese inscriptions as part of the compound Vāli-dvīpa (or Wāli-dvīpa), where Sanskrit dvīpa (Sanskrit: द्वीप) means "island".

One of the earliest attestations of Vāli-dvīpa occurs in the Belanjong (Blanjong) pillar inscription, dated to Saka year 835 / Phalguna month, under King Sri Kesari Warmadewa (c. 914 CE).

The precise meaning of the element Vāli in Vāli-dvīpa is not certain. Some hypothesized interpretations include:

- That Bali derives from Sanskrit bali (बलि), meaning "offering", "tribute", or "sacrifice", thus rendering Bali-dvīpa as "Island of offerings" or "Island of sacrifice".
- That Vāli may relate to terms signifying "power", or "force", or possibly be a phonetic variation (i.e., alternation of b and v) common in epigraphy, which would suggest meanings such as "Island of strength" or similar.

== History ==
=== Ancient ===
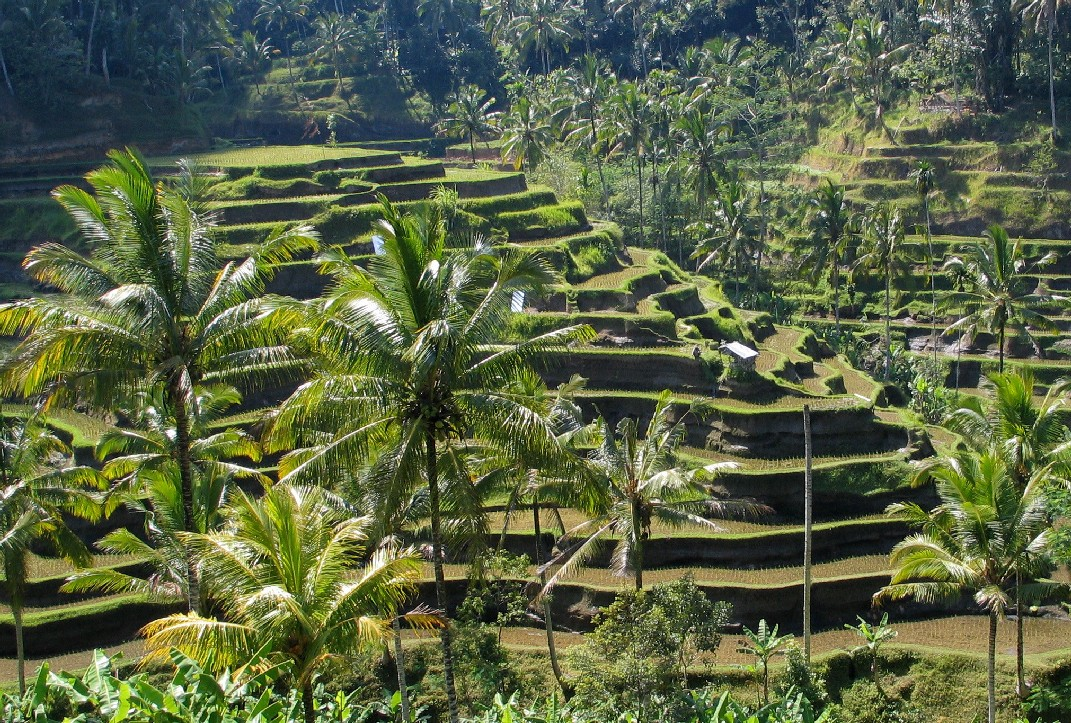
The Subak irrigation system has existed since the 9th century

Bali was inhabited around 2000 BC by Austronesian peoples who migrated originally from the island of Taiwan to Southeast Asia and Oceania through Maritime Southeast Asia. Culturally and linguistically, the Balinese are closely related to the people of the Indonesian archipelago, Malaysia, Brunei, the Philippines, and Oceania. Stone tools dating from this time have been found near the village of Cekik in the island's west.

In ancient Bali, nine Hindu sects existed: the Pasupata, Bhairawa, Siwa Shidanta, Vaishnava, Bodha, Brahma, Resi, Sora, and Ganapatya. Each sect revered a specific deity as its personal Godhead.

Inscriptions from 896 and 911 do not mention a king until 914, when Sri Kesarivarma, a contemporary of the Kesari dynasty in the Kalinga Kingdom of ancient India, is mentioned. They also reveal an independent Bali, with a distinct dialect, being influenced by the Sanskrit and Pali languages, where Buddhism and Shaivism were practiced simultaneously. Mpu Sindok's great-granddaughter, Mahendradatta (Gunapriyadharmapatni), married the Bali king Udayana Warmadewa (Dharmodayanavarmadeva) around 989, giving birth to Airlangga around 1001. This marriage also brought more Hinduism and Javanese culture to Bali. Princess Sakalendukirana appeared in 1098. Suradhipa reigned from 1115 to 1119, and Jayasakti from 1146 until 1150. Jayapangus appears on inscriptions between 1178 and 1181, while Adikuntiketana and his son Paramesvara appear in 1204.

Balinese culture was strongly influenced by Indian, Chinese, and particularly Kalinga Hindu culture, beginning around the 1st century AD. The name Bali dwipa ("Bali island") has been discovered from various inscriptions, including the Blanjong pillar inscription written by Sri Kesari Warmadewa in 914 AD, and mentioning Walidwipa. It was during this time that the people developed their complex irrigation system, subak, to grow rice in wet-field cultivation. Some religious and cultural traditions still practiced today can be traced to this period.

The Hindu-Buddhist Majapahit Empire (1293–1520 AD) on eastern Java founded a Balinese colony in 1343. The uncle of Hayam Wuruk is mentioned in the charters of 1384–86. Mass Javanese immigration to Bali occurred in the next century when the Majapahit Empire fell in 1520. Bali's government then became an independent collection of Hindu kingdoms, which led to a Balinese national identity and major enhancements in culture, arts, and economy. The nation with various kingdoms became independent for up to 386 years until 1906, when the Dutch subjugated and repulsed the natives for economic control and took it over.

=== Portuguese contacts ===
The first known European contact with Bali is thought to have been made in 1512, when a Portuguese expedition led by António Abreu and Francisco Serrão sighted its northern shores. It was the first expedition of a series of bi-annual fleets to the Moluccas, which, throughout the 16th century, travelled along the coasts of the Sunda Islands. Bali was also mapped in 1512, in the chart of Francisco Rodrigues, aboard the expedition. In 1585, a ship foundered off the Bukit Peninsula and left a few Portuguese in the service of Dewa Agung.

=== Dutch East Indies ===
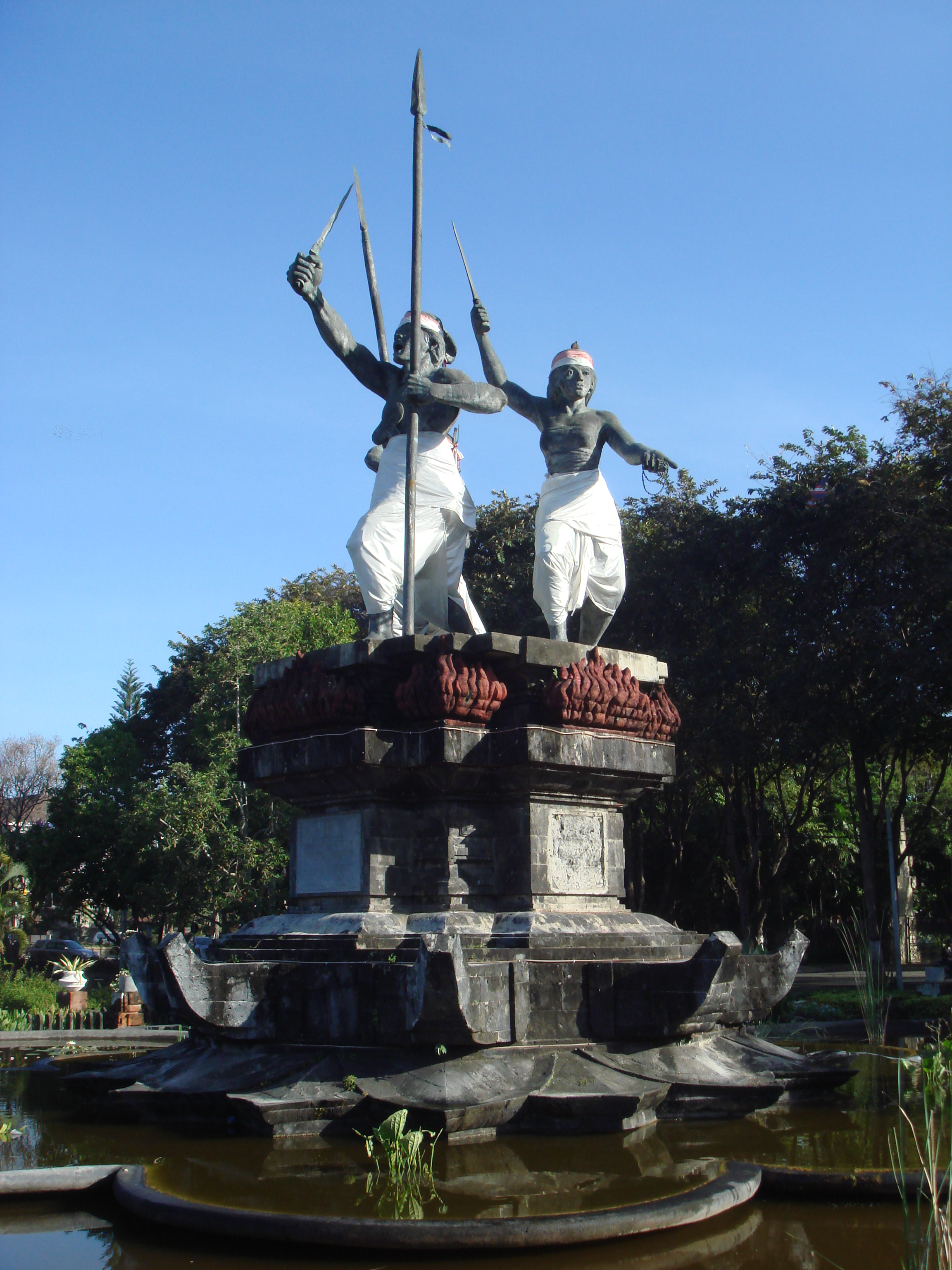
Puputan monument

In 1597, the Dutch merchant-explorer Cornelis de Houtman arrived at Bali, and the Dutch East India Company was established in 1602. The Dutch government expanded its control across the Indonesian archipelago during the second half of the 19th century. Dutch political and economic control over Bali began in the 1840s on the island's north coast when the Dutch pitted various competing Balinese realms against each other. In the late 1890s, struggles between Balinese kingdoms on the island's south were exploited by the Dutch to increase their control.

In June 1860, the famous Welsh naturalist, Alfred Russel Wallace, travelled to Bali from Singapore, landing at Buleleng on the north coast of the island. Wallace's trip to Bali was instrumental in helping him devise his Wallace Line theory. The Wallace Line is a faunal boundary that runs through the strait between Bali and Lombok. It is a boundary between species. In his travel memoir The Malay Archipelago, Wallace wrote of his experience in Bali, which includes a strong mention of the unique Balinese irrigation methods:

I was astonished and delighted; as my visit to Java was some years later, I had never beheld so beautiful and well-cultivated a district out of Europe. A slightly undulating plain extends from the seacoast about ten or twelve miles (16 or 19 kilometres) inland, where it is bounded by a fine range of wooded and cultivated hills. Houses and villages, marked out by dense clumps of coconut palms, tamarind and other fruit trees, are dotted about in every direction; while between them extend luxurious rice grounds, watered by an elaborate system of irrigation that would be the pride of the best-cultivated parts of Europe.

The Dutch mounted large naval and ground assaults at the Sanur region in 1906 and were met by the thousands of members of the royal family and their followers, who, rather than yield to the superior Dutch force, committed ritual suicide (puputan) to avoid the humiliation of surrender. Despite Dutch demands for surrender, an estimated 200 Balinese killed themselves rather than surrender. In the Dutch intervention in Bali, a similar mass suicide occurred in the face of a Dutch assault in Klungkung. Afterward, the Dutch governors exercised administrative control over the island, but local control over religion and culture generally remained intact. Dutch rule over Bali came later and was never as well established as in other parts of Indonesia, such as Java and Maluku.

In the 1930s, anthropologists Margaret Mead and Gregory Bateson, artists Miguel Covarrubias and Walter Spies, and musicologist Colin McPhee all spent time here. Their accounts of the island and its peoples created a Western image of Bali as "an enchanted land of aesthetes at peace with themselves and nature". Soon after, Western tourists began to visit the island. The sensuous image of Bali was enhanced in the West by a quasi-pornographic 1932 documentary, Virgins of Bali, about a day in the lives of two teenage Balinese girls, who the film's narrator Deane Dickason notes in the first scene "bathe their shamelessly nude bronze bodies." Under the looser version of the Hays code that existed up to 1934, nudity involving "civilised" (i.e., white) women was banned, but permitted with "uncivilised" (i.e., all non-white women), a loophole that was exploited by the producers of Virgins of Bali. The film, which mostly consisted of scenes of topless Balinese women, was a great success in 1932, and was perhaps the main catalyst for the popularity of Bali among tourists. The Dutch also dedicated significant efforts to implement Baliseering (lit. 'Balinization') politics to maintain traditions on the island, as well as preventing the Islamization of the Islamic sultanates from Java and banning Christian missionaries' activities.

Imperial Japan occupied Bali during World War II. It was not originally a target in their Netherlands East Indies Campaign; however, as the airfields on Borneo were inoperative due to heavy rains, the Imperial Japanese Army decided to occupy Bali, which did not suffer from comparable weather. The island had no regular Royal Netherlands East Indies Army (KNIL) troops. There was only a Native Auxiliary Corps Prajoda (Korps Prajoda) consisting of about 600 native soldiers and several Dutch KNIL officers under the command of KNIL Lieutenant Colonel W.P. Roodenburg. On 19 February 1942, the Japanese forces landed near the town of Sanoer (Sanur) and the island was quickly captured.

During the Japanese occupation, a Balinese military officer, I Gusti Ngurah Rai, formed a Balinese 'freedom army'. The harsh treatment of the Balinese by the Japanese occupation forces fomented more resentment than the former Dutch colonial rulers.

=== Independence from the Dutch ===
In 1945, Bali was liberated by the British 5th Infantry Division under the command of Major-General Robert Mansergh, who took the Japanese surrender. Once Japanese forces had been repatriated, the island was handed over to the Dutch the following year.

In 1946, the Dutch constituted Bali as one of the 13 administrative districts of the newly proclaimed State of East Indonesia, a rival state to the Republic of Indonesia, which was proclaimed and headed by Sukarno and Hatta. Bali was included in the "Republic of the United States of Indonesia" when the Netherlands recognised Indonesian independence on 29 December 1949.

Bali province previously had been part of the province of the Lesser Sunda Islands (Nusa Tenggara) after the recognition of Indonesian sovereignty. The province of Bali was created with the enactment of Law No. 64 of 1958 dated 14 August 1958, on the Establishment of the new provinces of Bali, West Nusa Tenggara, and East Nusa Tenggara.The first governor of Bali, Anak Agung Bagus Sutedja, was appointed by President Sukarno in 1958, when Bali became a province.

=== Contemporary ===
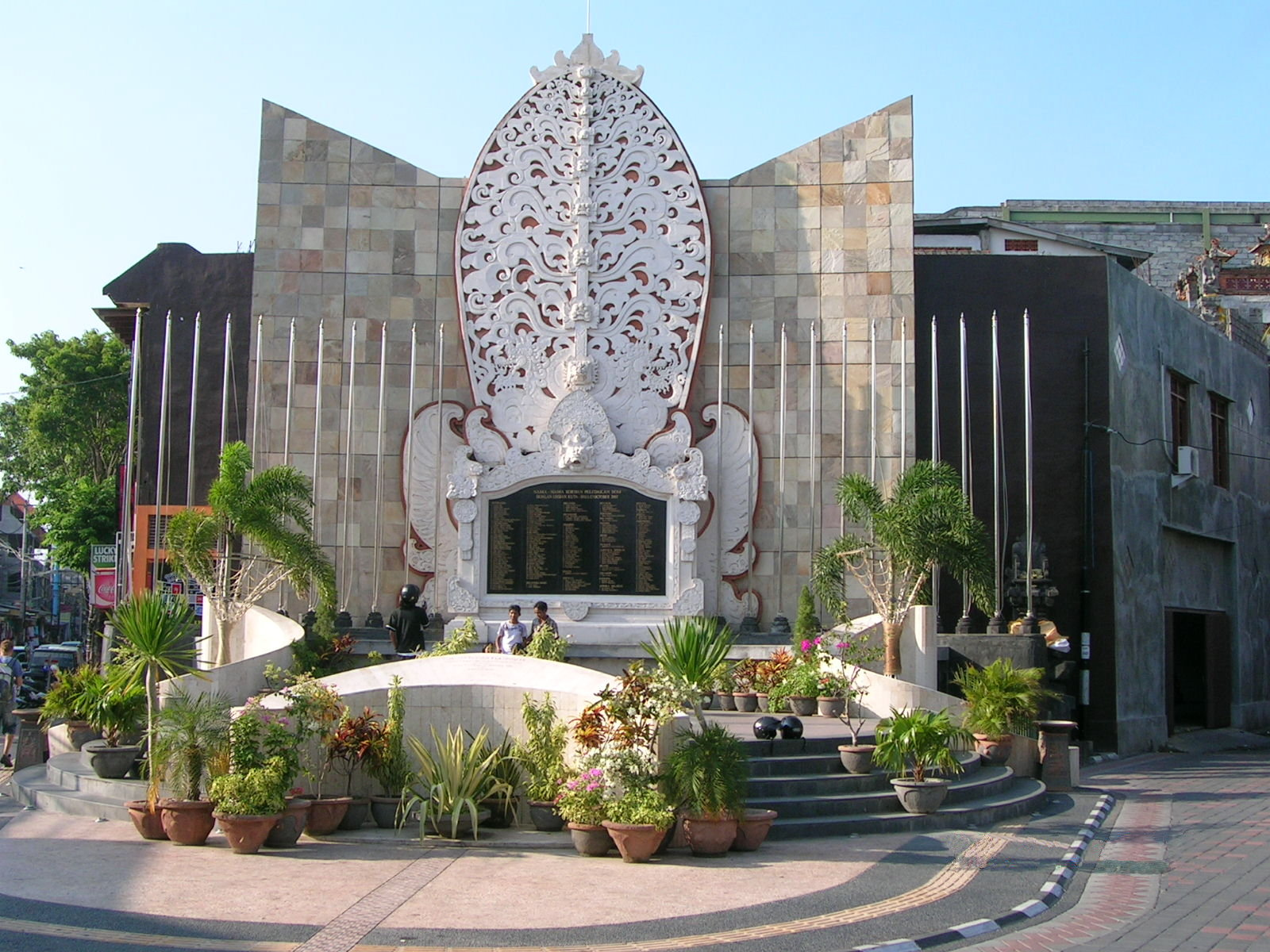
2002 Bali bombings memorial

The 1963 eruption of Mount Agung killed thousands, created economic havoc, and forced many displaced Balinese to be transmigrated to other parts of Indonesia. Mirroring the widening of social divisions across Indonesia in the 1950s and early 1960s, Bali saw conflict between supporters of the traditional caste system and those rejecting this system. Politically, the opposition was represented by supporters of the Indonesian Communist Party (PKI) and the Indonesian Nationalist Party (PNI), with tensions and ill-feeling further increased by the PKI's land reform programmes. A purported coup attempt in Jakarta was averted by forces led by General Suharto.

The army became the dominant power as it instigated a violent anti-communist purge backed by Western powers, in which the army blamed the PKI for the coup. Most estimates suggest that at least 500,000 people were killed across Indonesia, with an estimated 80,000 killed in Bali, equivalent to 5% of the island's population. With no Islamic forces involved as in Java and Sumatra, upper-caste PNI landlords led the extermination of PKI members.

As a result of the 1965–66 massacres, Suharto was able to manoeuvre Sukarno out of the presidency. His "New Order" government re-established relations with Western countries. The pre-war Bali, as "paradise," was revived in a modern form. The resulting large growth in tourism has led to a dramatic increase in Balinese standards of living and significant foreign exchange earned for the country.

A bombing in 2002 by militant Islamists in the tourist area of Kuta killed 202 people, mostly foreigners. This attack, and another in 2005, severely reduced tourism, producing much economic hardship on the island.

On 9 July 2008, for the first time in Bali's history, the election for governor and vice governor of Bali was democratically elected by the people of Bali directly.

On 27 November 2017, Mount Agung erupted five times, causing the evacuation of thousands, disrupting air travel, and causing much environmental damage. Further eruptions also occurred between 2018 and 2019.

On 15–16 November 2022, with the 2022 G20 Bali summit, the seventeenth meeting of the Group of Twenty (G20) was held in Nusa Dua.

== Geography ==
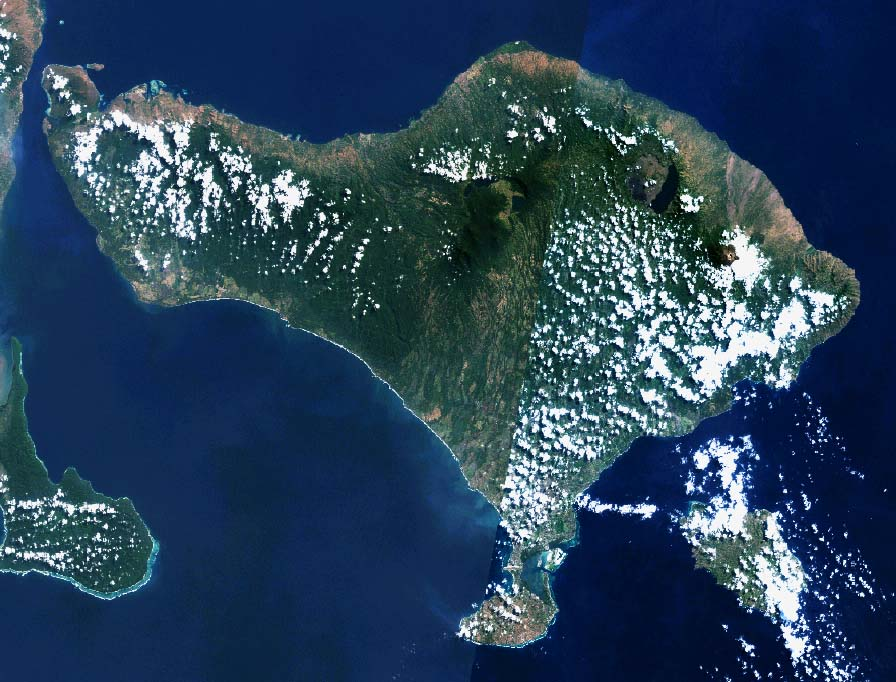
Aerial photograph of Bali

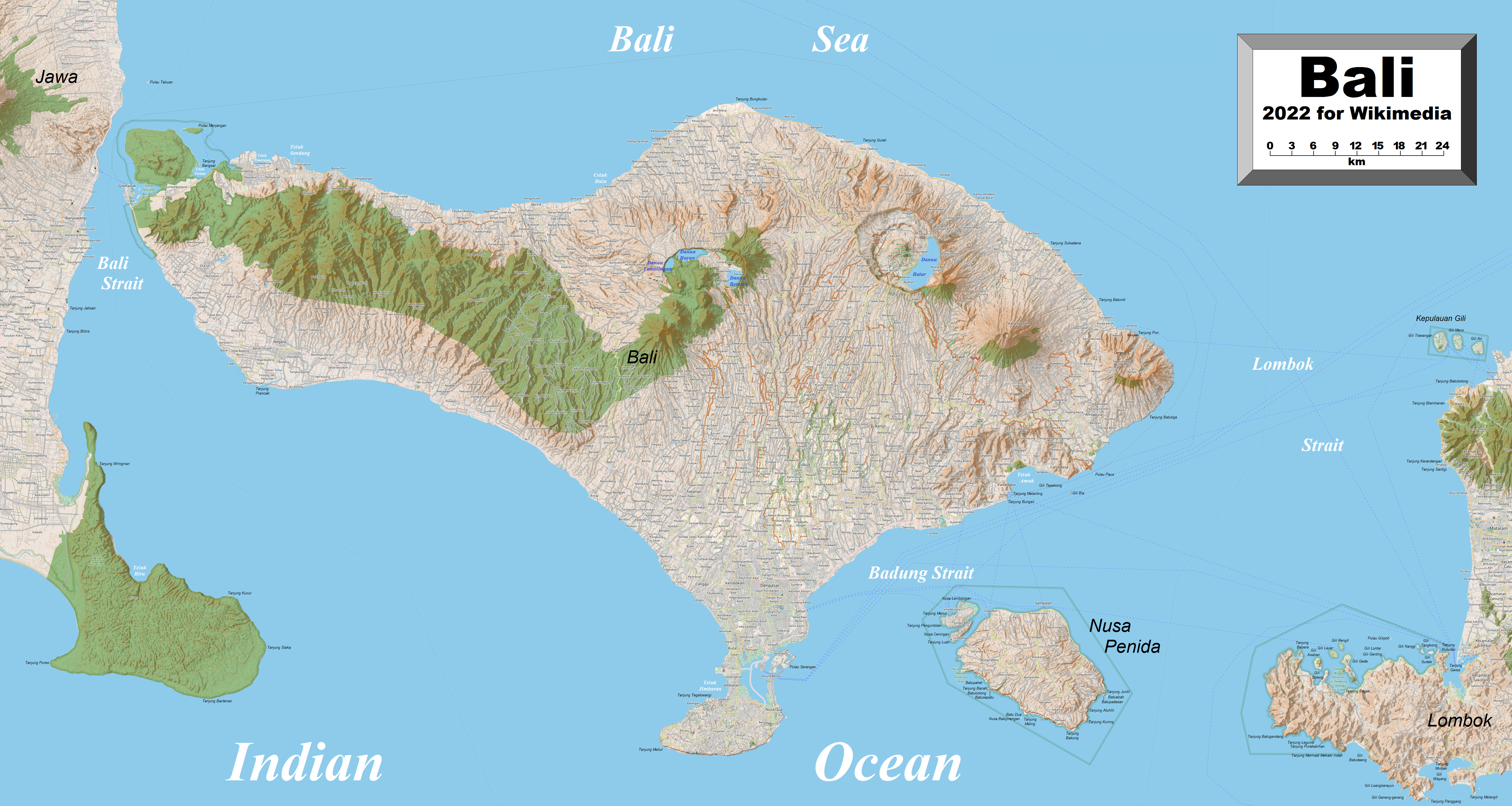
Detailed map of Bali

The island of Bali lies 3.2 km (2.0 mi) east of Java, and is approximately 8 degrees south of the equator. Bali and Java are separated by the Bali Strait. East to west, the island is approximately 153 km (95 mi) wide and spans approximately 112 km (70 mi) north to south; administratively it covers 5,590.15 km^{2} (2,158.37 sq mi), or 5,387.31 km^{2} (2,080.05 sq mi) excluding offshore Nusa Penida District, which comprises three small islands off the southeast coast of Bali. Its population density was roughly 798 people/km^{2} (2,070 people/mi^{2}) in mid 2024.

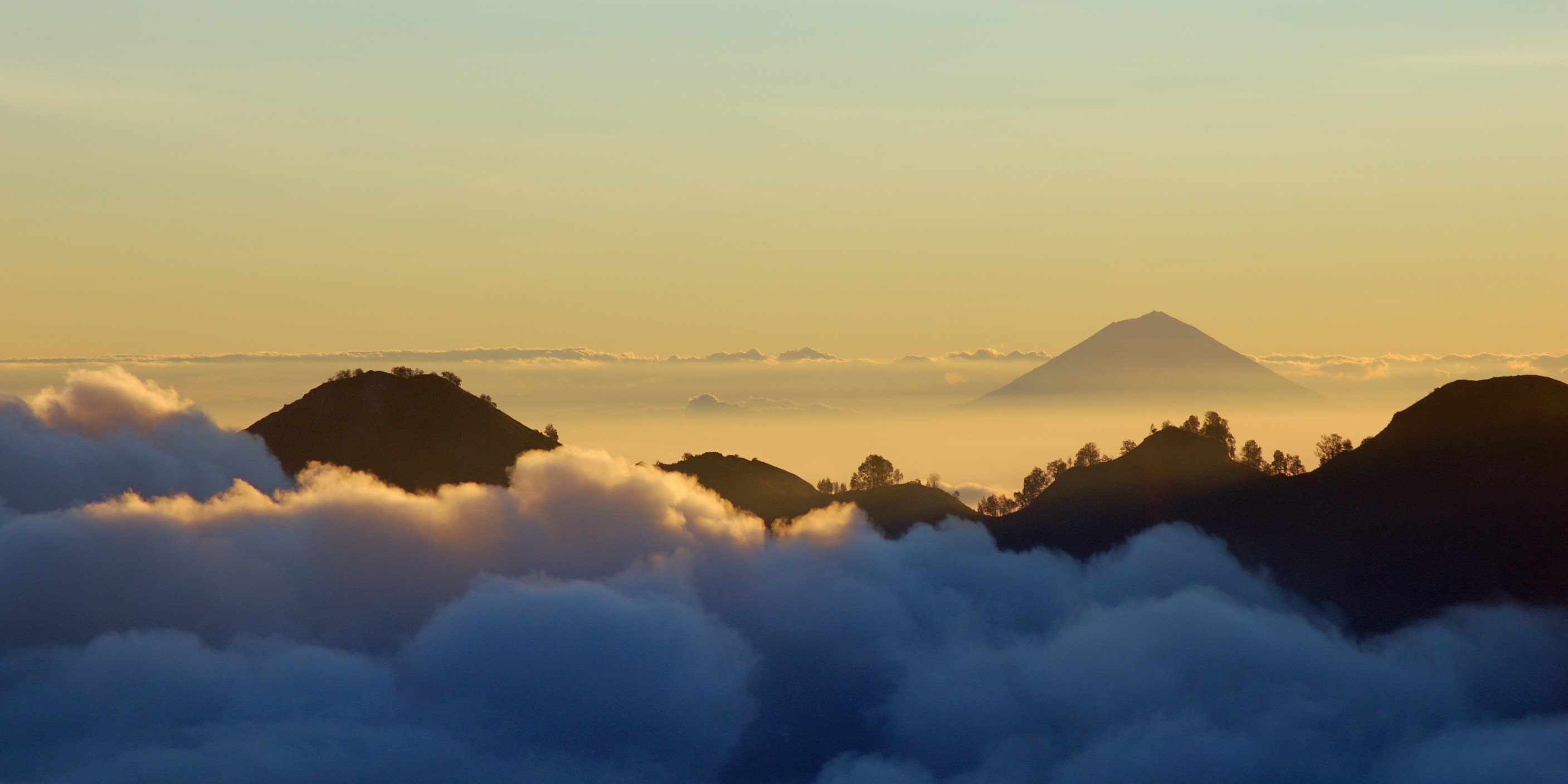
Mount Agung is the highest point of Bali.

Bali's central mountains include several peaks over 2,000 metres (6,600 feet) in elevation and active volcanoes such as Mount Batur. The highest is Mount Agung (3,031 m; 9,944 ft), known as the "mother mountain", which is an active volcano rated as one of the world's most likely sites for a massive eruption within the next 100 years. In late 2017, Mount Agung started erupting and large numbers of people were evacuated, temporarily closing the island's airport. Mountains range from centre to the eastern side, with Mount Agung the easternmost peak. Bali's volcanic nature has contributed to its exceptional fertility, and its tall mountain ranges provide the high rainfall that supports the highly productive agricultural sector. South of the mountains is a broad, steadily descending area where most of Bali's large rice crop is grown. The northern side of the mountains slopes more steeply to the sea and is the main coffee-producing area of the island, along with rice, vegetables, and cattle. The longest river, Ayung River, flows approximately 75 km (47 mi) (see List of rivers of Bali).

The island is surrounded by coral reefs. Beaches in the south tend to have white sand, while those in the north and west have black sand. Bali has no major waterways, although the Ho River is navigable by small sampan boats. Black sand beaches between Pasut and Klatingdukuh are being developed for tourism, but apart from the seaside temple of Tanah Lot, they are not yet used for significant tourism.

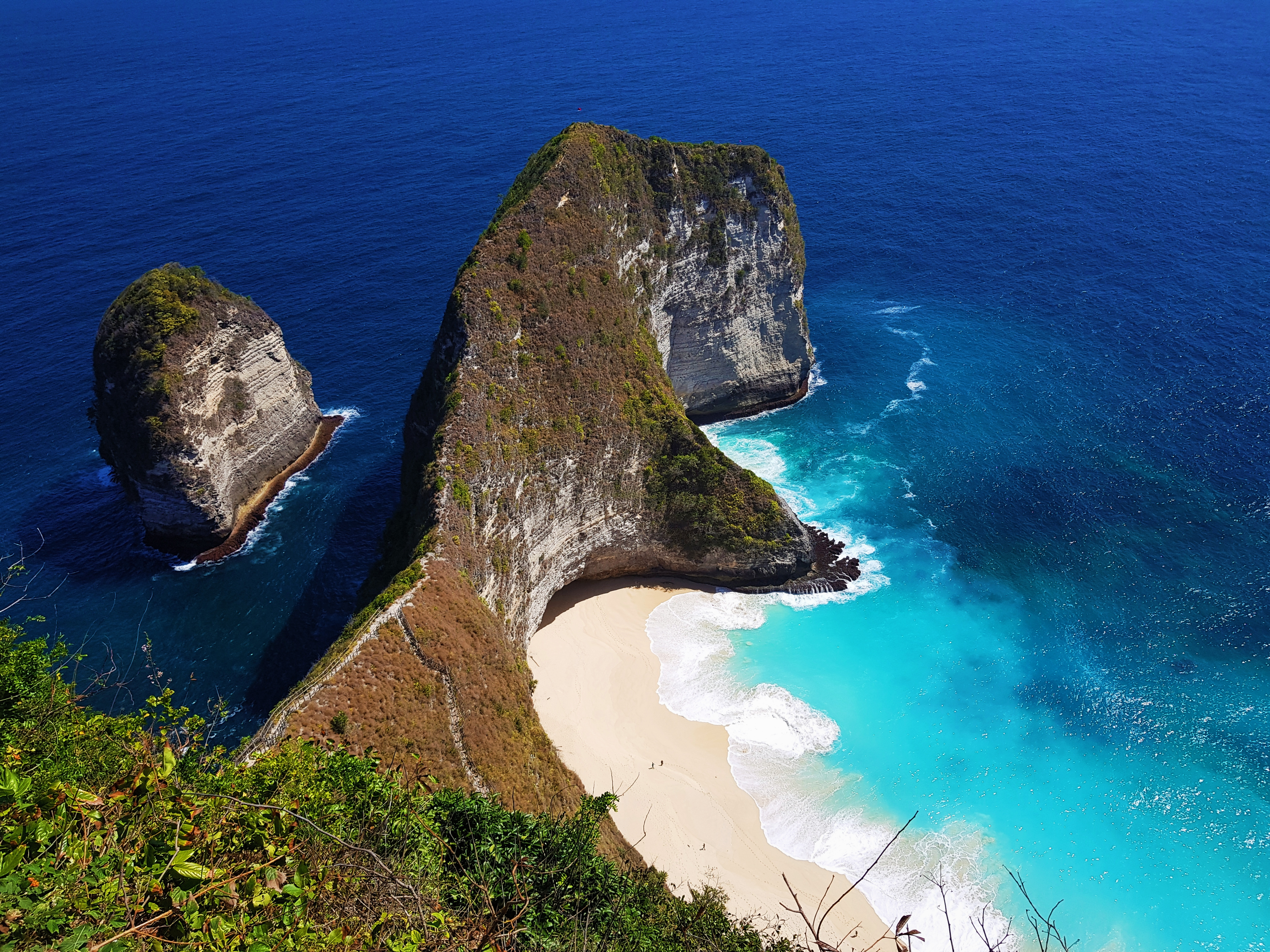
The cliff of Nusa Penida with Kelingking Beach in the foreground

The largest city is the provincial capital, Denpasar, near the southern coast. Its population is around 755,600 (in mid 2024). Bali's second-largest city is the old colonial capital, Singaraja, which is located on the north coast and whose urban area is home to around 150,000 people in 2024. Other important cities include the beach resort, Kuta, which is practically part of Denpasar's urban area, and Ubud, situated at the north of Denpasar, which is regarded as the island's cultural centre.

Three small islands lie to the immediate south-east and all are administratively part of the Klungkung regency of Bali: Nusa Penida, Nusa Lembongan and Nusa Ceningan. These islands are separated from Bali by the Badung Strait.

To the east, the Lombok Strait separates Bali from Lombok and marks the biogeographical division between the fauna of the Indomalayan realm and the distinctly different fauna of Australasia. The transition is known as the Wallace Line, named after Alfred Russel Wallace, who first proposed a transition zone between these two major biomes. When sea levels dropped during the Pleistocene ice age, Bali was connected to Java and Sumatra and to the mainland of Asia and shared the Asian fauna, but the deep water of the Lombok Strait continued to keep Lombok Island and the Lesser Sunda archipelago isolated.

=== Climate ===
Being just 8 degrees south of the equator, Bali has a fairly even climate all year round. Average year-round temperature stands at around 30 °C (86 °F) with a humidity level of about 85%.

Daytime temperatures at low elevations vary between 20 and 33 °C (68 and 91 °F), but the temperatures decrease significantly with increasing elevation.

The west monsoon is in place from approximately October to April, and this can bring significant rain, particularly from December to March. During the rainy season, there are comparatively fewer tourists seen in Bali. During the Easter and Christmas holidays, the weather is very unpredictable. Outside of the monsoon period, humidity is relatively low and any rain is unlikely in lowland areas.

Climate data for Bali (Island / Province average)
Month	Jan	Feb	Mar	Apr	May	Jun	Jul	Aug	Sep	Oct	Nov	Dec	Year
Mean daily maximum °C (°F)	30.8 (87.4)	31.0 (87.8)	31.1 (88.0)	31.2 (88.2)	30.7 (87.3)	29.9 (85.8)	29.2 (84.6)	29.2 (84.6)	30.1 (86.2)	31.1 (88.0)	31.7 (89.1)	31.0 (87.8)	31.7 (89.1)
Daily mean °C (°F)	27.8 (82.0)	27.9 (82.2)	27.9 (82.2)	28.0 (82.4)	27.6 (81.7)	27.0 (80.6)	26.5 (79.7)	26.4 (79.5)	26.8 (80.2)	27.7 (81.9)	28.3 (82.9)	28.0 (82.4)	27.45 (81.41)
Mean daily minimum °C (°F)	24.8 (76.6)	24.8 (76.6)	24.8 (76.6)	24.8 (76.6)	24.5 (76.1)	24.1 (75.4)	23.8 (74.8)	23.5 (74.3)	23.6 (74.5)	24.4 (75.9)	25.0 (77.0)	25.1 (77.2)	23.5 (74.3)
Average precipitation mm (inches)	350 (13.8)	280 (11.0)	215 (8.5)	90 (3.5)	75 (3.0)	70 (2.8)	50 (2.0)	15 (0.6)	40 (1.6)	90 (3.5)	150 (5.9)	290 (11.4)	1,715 (67.6)
Average precipitation days (≥ days)	19	18	20	12	8	7	4	3	3	6	10	16	126
Source: Climates to Travel (1991–2020 averages)

Climate data for Bali Province (Denpasar region)
Month	Jan	Feb	Mar	Apr	May	Jun	Jul	Aug	Sep	Oct	Nov	Dec	Year
Mean daily maximum °C (°F)	30.8 (87.4)	31.0 (87.8)	31.1 (88.0)	31.2 (88.2)	30.7 (87.3)	29.9 (85.8)	29.2 (84.6)	29.2 (84.6)	30.1 (86.2)	31.1 (88.0)	31.7 (89.1)	31.0 (87.8)	31.7 (89.1)
Daily mean °C (°F)	27.1 (80.8)	27.3 (81.1)	27.4 (81.3)	27.5 (81.5)	27.2 (81.0)	26.5 (79.7)	26.0 (78.8)	25.8 (78.4)	26.3 (79.3)	27.1 (80.8)	27.7 (81.9)	27.5 (81.5)	26.8 (80.2)
Mean daily minimum °C (°F)	24.3 (75.7)	24.3 (75.7)	24.3 (75.7)	24.6 (76.3)	24.6 (76.3)	24.0 (75.2)	23.3 (73.9)	22.9 (73.2)	23.0 (73.4)	23.6 (74.5)	25.5 (77.9)	25.8 (78.4)	22.9 (73.2)
Average precipitation mm (inches)	296 (11.7)	244 (9.6)	210 (8.3)	131 (5.2)	74 (2.9)	57 (2.2)	53 (2.1)	42 (1.7)	53 (2.1)	68 (2.7)	237 (9.3)	298 (11.7)	1,763 (69.5)
Average precipitation days (≥ days)	20	18	19	16	14	12	13	11	11	14	20	23	191
Source: Climate-Data / Weather-Atlas / Weather2Travel / JICA

== Flora and fauna ==
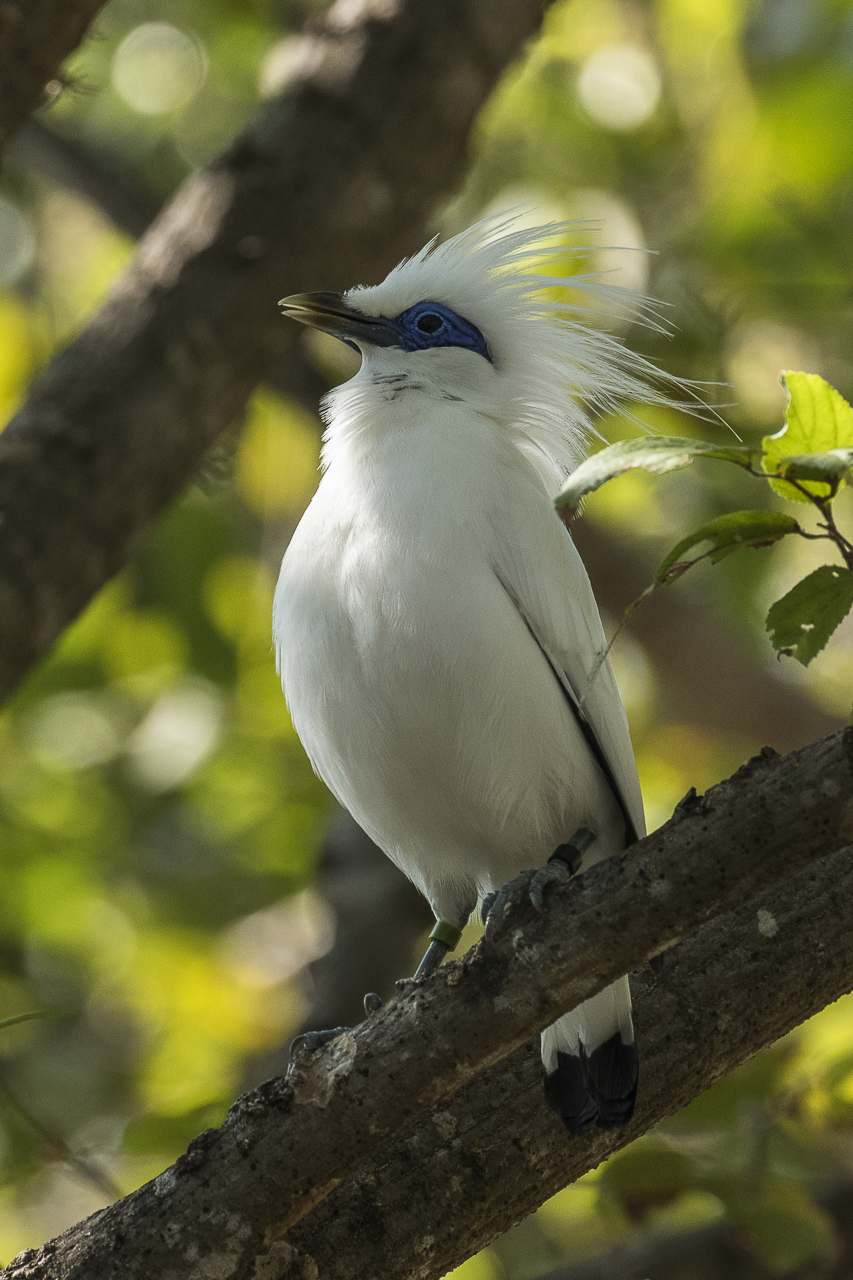
Bali myna (Jalak Bali) is one of the protected birds located in West Bali National Park

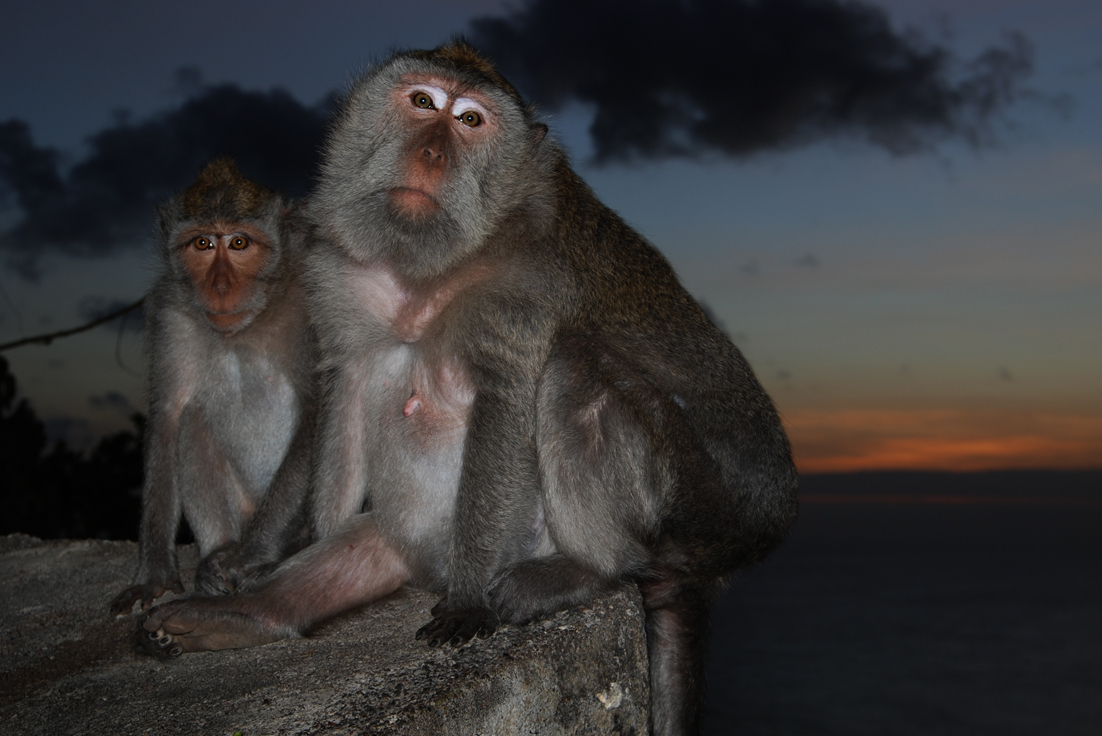
Crab-eating macaque monkeys in Uluwatu

Bali lies just to the west of the Wallace Line, and thus has a fauna that is Asian in character, with very little Australasian influence, and has more in common with Java than with Lombok. An exception is the yellow-crested cockatoo, a member of a primarily Australasian family. There are around 280 species of birds, including the critically endangered Bali myna, which is endemic. Others include barn swallow, black-naped oriole, black racket-tailed treepie, crested serpent-eagle, crested treeswift, dollarbird, Java sparrow, lesser adjutant, long-tailed shrike, milky stork, Pacific swallow, red-rumped swallow, sacred kingfisher, sea eagle, woodswallow, savanna nightjar, stork-billed kingfisher, yellow-vented bulbul and great egret.

Until the early 20th century, Bali was possibly home to several large mammals: banteng, leopard and the endemic Bali tiger. The banteng still occurs in its domestic form, whereas leopards are found only in neighbouring Java, and the Bali tiger is extinct. The last definite record of a tiger on Bali dates from 1937 when one was shot, though the subspecies may have survived until the 1940s or 1950s. Pleistocene and Holocene megafaunas include banteng and giant tapir (based on speculations that they might have reached up to the Wallace Line), and rhinoceros.

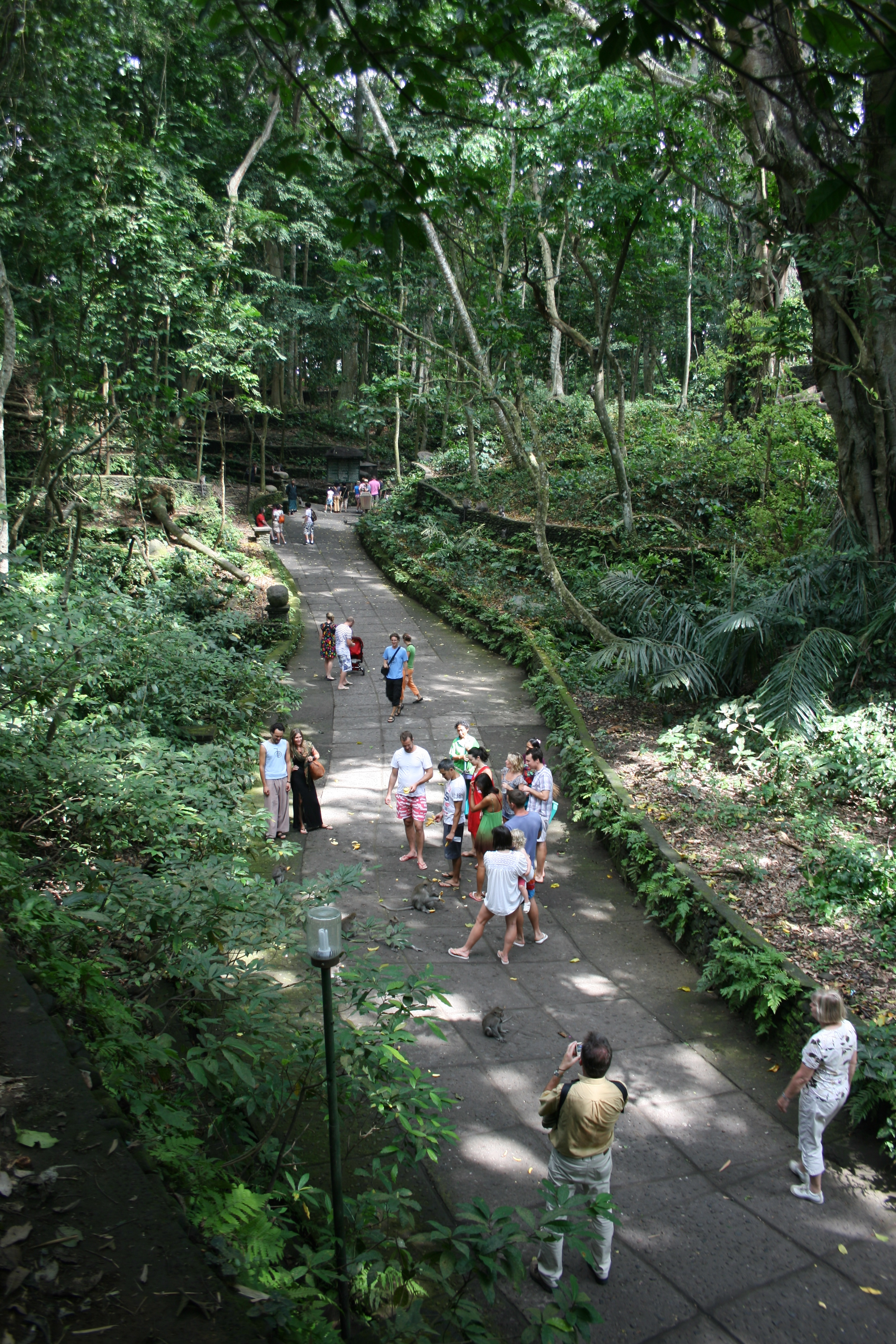
Ubud Monkey Forest

Squirrels are quite commonly encountered, less often is the Asian palm civet, which is also kept in coffee farms to produce kopi luwak. Bats are well represented, perhaps the most famous place to encounter them remaining is the Goa Lawah (Temple of the Bats) where they are worshipped by the locals and also constitute a tourist attraction. They also occur in other cave temples, for instance at Gangga Beach. Two species of monkey occur. The crab-eating macaque, known locally as "kera", is quite common around human settlements and temples, where it becomes accustomed to being fed by humans, particularly in any of the three "monkey forest" temples, such as the popular one in the Ubud area. They are also quite often kept as pets by locals. The second monkey, endemic to Java and some surrounding islands such as Bali, is far rarer and more elusive and is the Javan langur, locally known as "lutung". They occur in a few places apart from the West Bali National Park. They are born an orange colour, though they would have already changed to a more blackish colouration by their first year. In Java, however, there is more of a tendency for this species to retain its juvenile orange colour into adulthood, and a mixture of black and orange monkeys can be seen together as a family. Other rarer mammals include the Sunda leopard cat, Sunda pangolin and black giant squirrel. Snakes include the king cobra and reticulated python. The water monitor can grow to at least 1.5 m (4.9 ft) in length and 50 kg (110 lb) and can move quickly.

There is an ongoing trade in live fruit bats for medicinal use in Bali. Research led by EcoVerde Global Consulting showed ongoing trade in the markets of Denpasar and Mengwi with 100s of bats being offered for sale

The rich coral reefs around the coast, particularly around popular diving spots such as Tulamben, Amed, Menjangan or neighbouring Nusa Penida, host a wide range of marine life, for instance hawksbill turtle, giant sunfish, giant manta ray, giant moray eel, bumphead parrotfish, hammerhead shark, reef shark, barracuda, and sea snakes. Dolphins are commonly encountered on the north coast near Singaraja and Lovina.

A team of scientists surveyed from 29 April 2011, to 11 May 2011, at 33 sea sites around Bali. They discovered 952 species of reef fish of which 8 were new discoveries at Pemuteran, Gilimanuk, Nusa Dua, Tulamben and Candidasa, and 393 coral species, including two new ones at Padangbai and between Padangbai and Amed. The average coverage level of healthy coral was 36% (better than in Raja Ampat and Halmahera by 29% or in Fakfak and Kaimana by 25%) with the highest coverage found in Gili Selang and Gili Mimpang in Candidasa, Karangasem Regency. Among the larger trees the most common are: banyan trees, jackfruit, coconuts, bamboo species, acacia trees and also endless rows of coconuts and banana species. Numerous flowers can be seen: hibiscus, frangipani, bougainvillea, poinsettia, oleander, jasmine, water lily, lotus, roses, begonias, orchids and hydrangeas exist. On higher grounds that receive more moisture, for instance, around Kintamani, certain species of fern trees, mushrooms and even pine trees thrive well. Rice comes in many varieties. Other plants with agricultural value include: salak, mangosteen, corn, Kintamani orange, coffee and water spinach.

== Environment ==
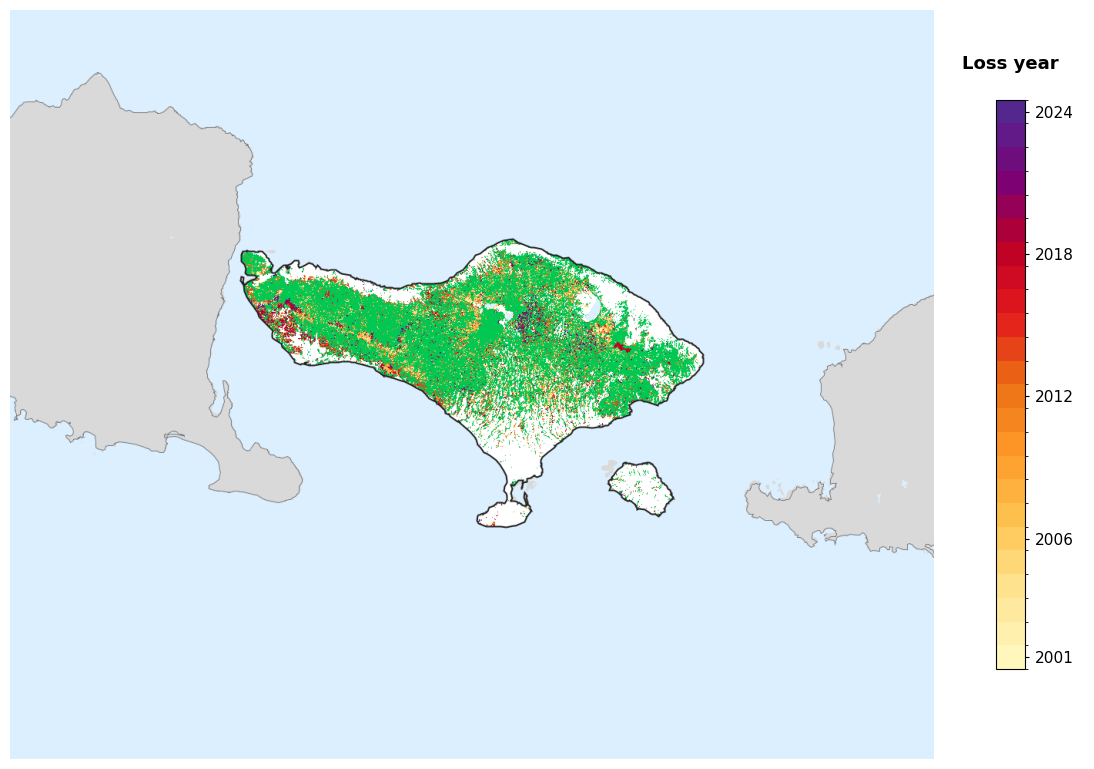
Tree-cover loss year in Bali, 2001-2024, from the Global Forest Change dataset.

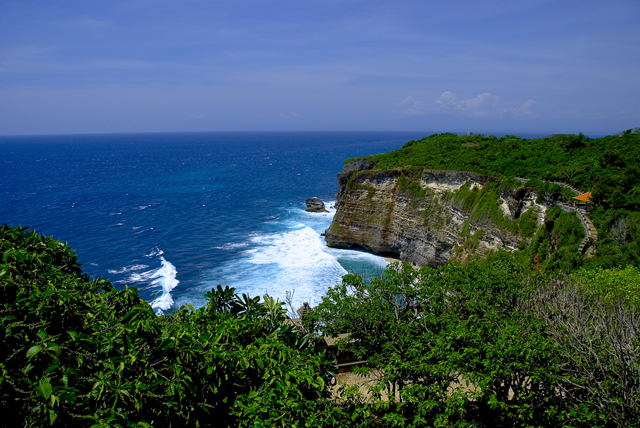
Uluwatu

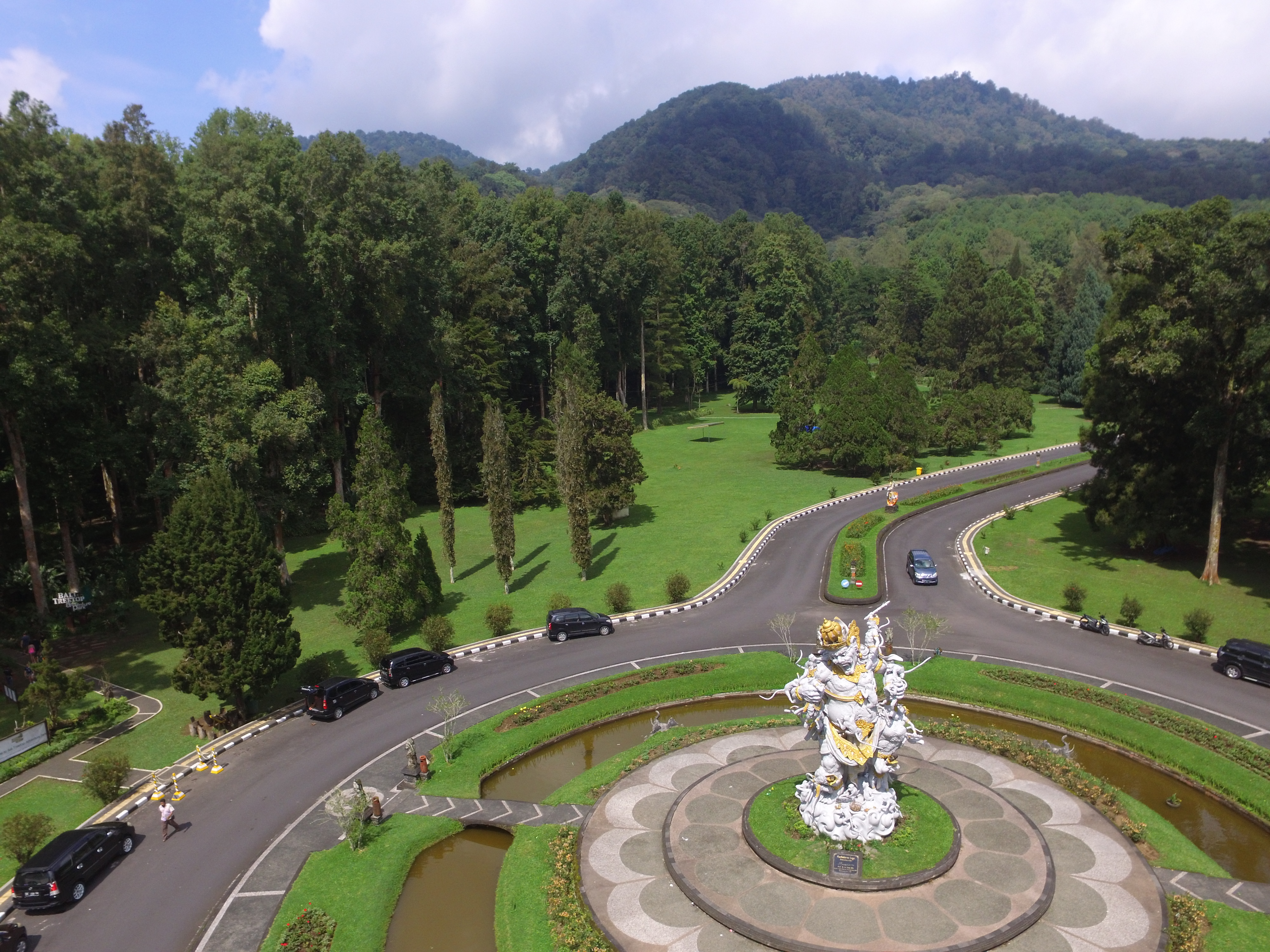
Bali Botanic Garden in Bedugul

Over-exploitation by the tourist industry has led to 200 out of 400 rivers on the island drying up. Research suggests that the southern part of Bali would face a water shortage. To ease the shortage, the central government plans to build a water catchment and processing facility at Petanu River in Gianyar. The 300 litres capacity of water per second will be channelled to Denpasar, Badung and Gianyar in 2013.

A 2010 Environment Ministry report on its environmental quality index gave Bali a score of 99.65, which was the highest score of Indonesia's 33 provinces. The score considers the level of total suspended solids, dissolved oxygen, and chemical oxygen demand in water.

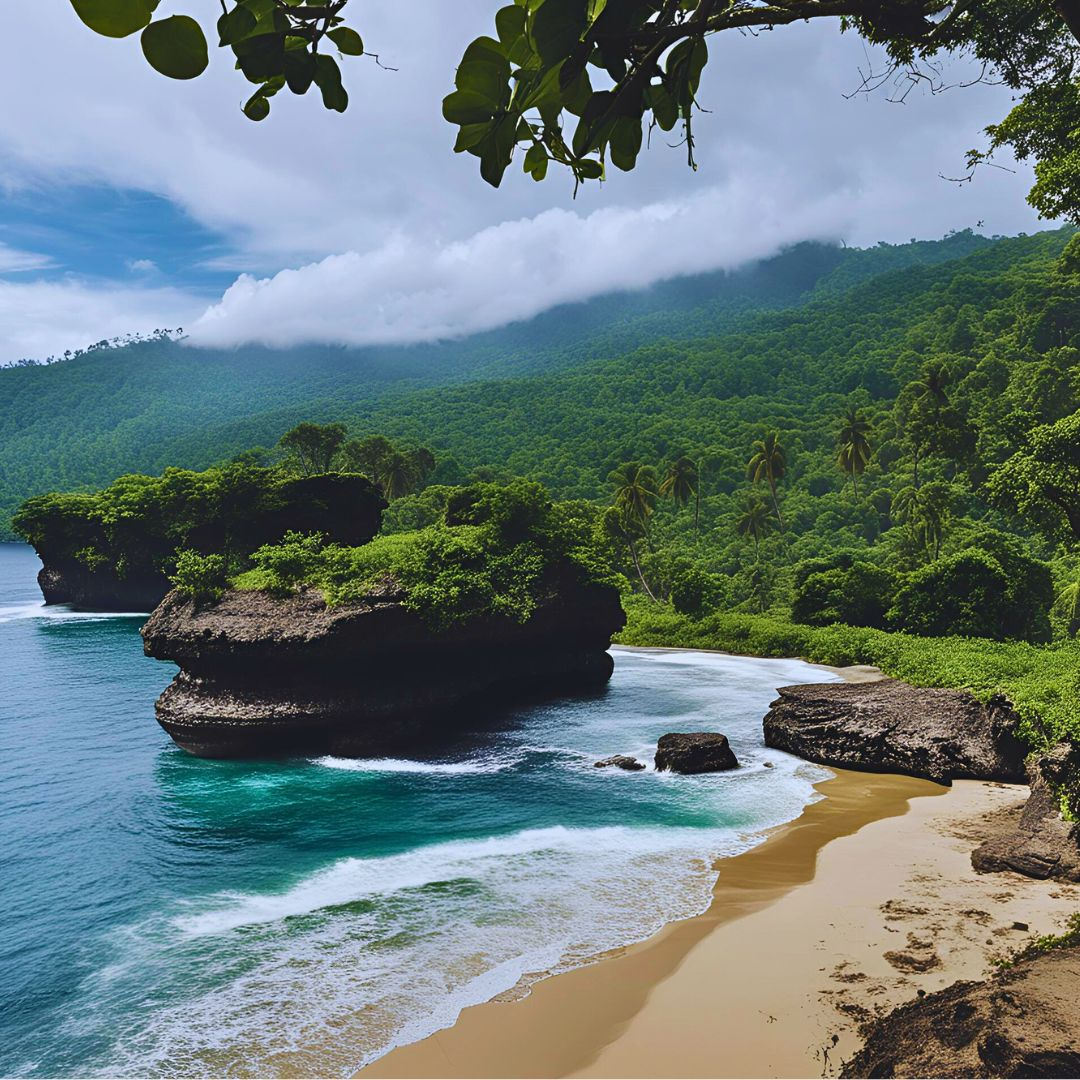
West Bali National Park

Erosion at Lebih Beach has seen seven metres (23 feet) of land lost every year. Decades ago, this beach was used for holy pilgrimages with more than 10,000 people, but they have now moved to Masceti Beach.

In 2017, a year when Bali received nearly 5.7 million tourists, government officials declared a "garbage emergency" in response to the covering of 3.6-mile stretch of coastline in plastic waste brought in by the tide, amid concerns that the pollution could dissuade visitors from returning. Indonesia is one of the world's worst plastic polluters, with some estimates suggesting the country is the source of around 10 per cent of the world's plastic waste.

On 3 February 2026, Bali launched a major beach clean up after President Prabowo Subianto's criticisms of the Bali's growing waste problem. Hundreds of personnel from the Bali Police and the local military joined students and volunteers to collect rubbish from two of the island’s most popular tourist beaches: Kuta and Kedonganan in Badung Regency.

== Government and politics ==
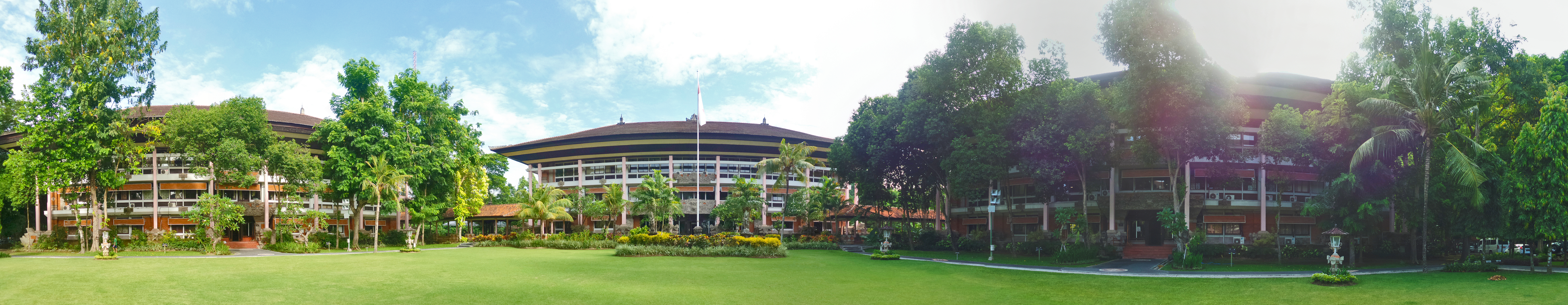
Bali Governor's Office

The governor is the highest officeholder in the Bali provincial government with the vice governor being the second highest officeholder. The Governor of Bali is responsible for the territory of the Province of Bali. The current governor in office in the province of Bali is I Wayan Koster who was first being elected in the 2018 Bali gubernatorial election accompanied by his first running mate at that time Tjokorda Oka Artha Ardana Sukawati (Cok Ace). Koster is the 8th governor of Bali, since the province was formed into the province of Bali in 1958 based on Law Number 64 of 1958. Koster and Cok Ace were inaugurated by the president of the Republic of Indonesia at that time Joko Widodo, at the State Palace, Jakarta on September 5, 2018, for the five years term of office (2018–2023). After his term of office ended, Sang Made Mahendra Jaya was inaugurated as acting governor of Bali on September 5, 2023 with a limited authority in the government. After re-elected in 2024 I Wayan Koster and I Nyoman Giri Prasta was inaugurated on February 20, 2025 at the State Palace by the incumbent President of Indonesia Prabowo Subianto for the five years term of office (2025–2030).

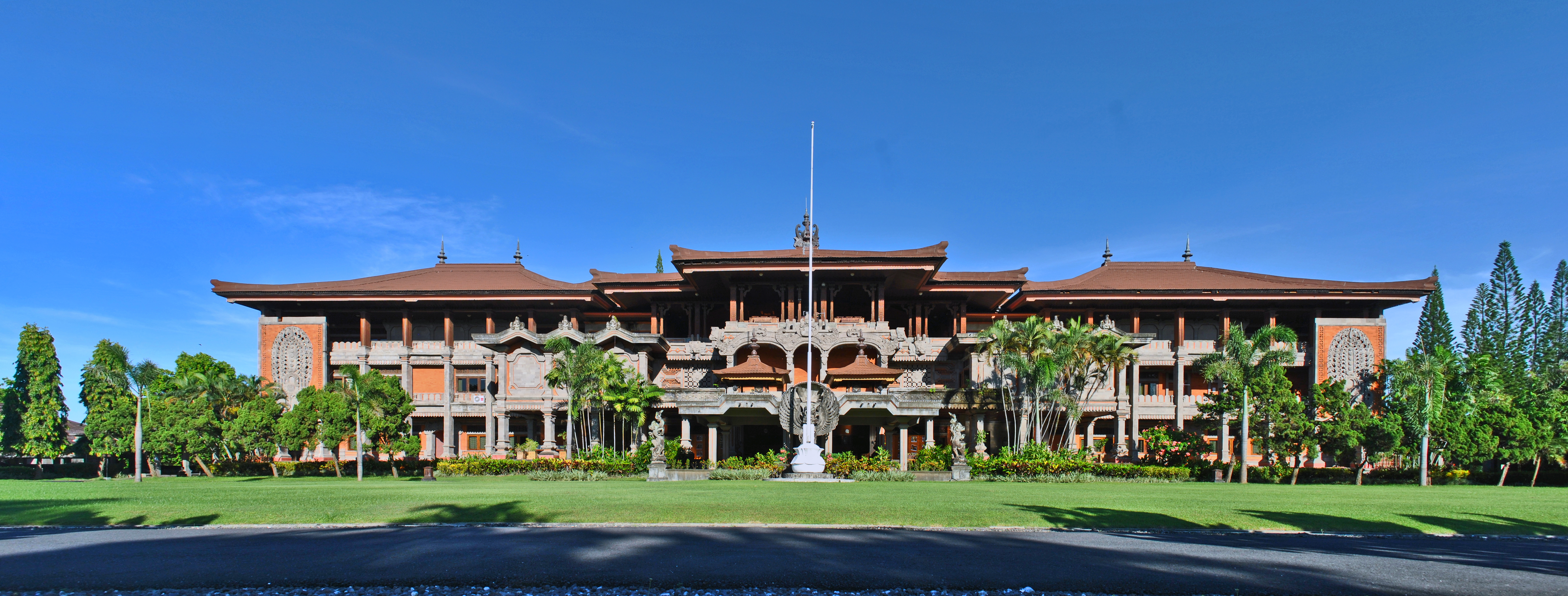
Bali's parliament (DPRD) building

In the national legislature, Bali is represented by nine members, with a single electoral district covering the whole province. The Bali Regional House of Representatives (DPRD), the provincial legislature, has 55 members. The province's politics has historically been dominated by the Indonesian Democratic Party of Struggle (PDI-P), which has won by far the most votes in every election in Bali since the first free elections in 1999, it currently forms the ruling government in the province.

=== Administrative divisions ===
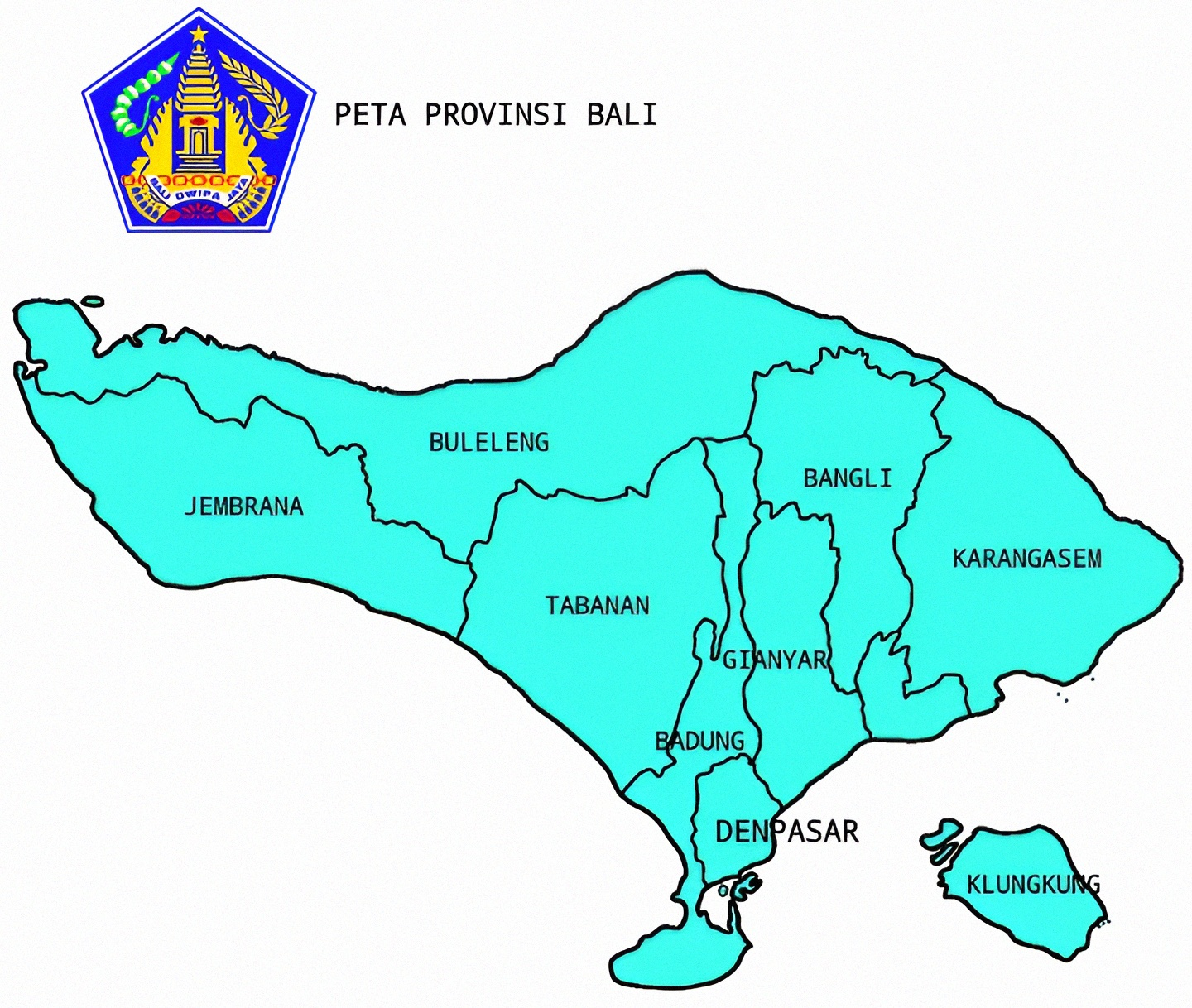
Map of regencies (kabupaten) and city of Bali

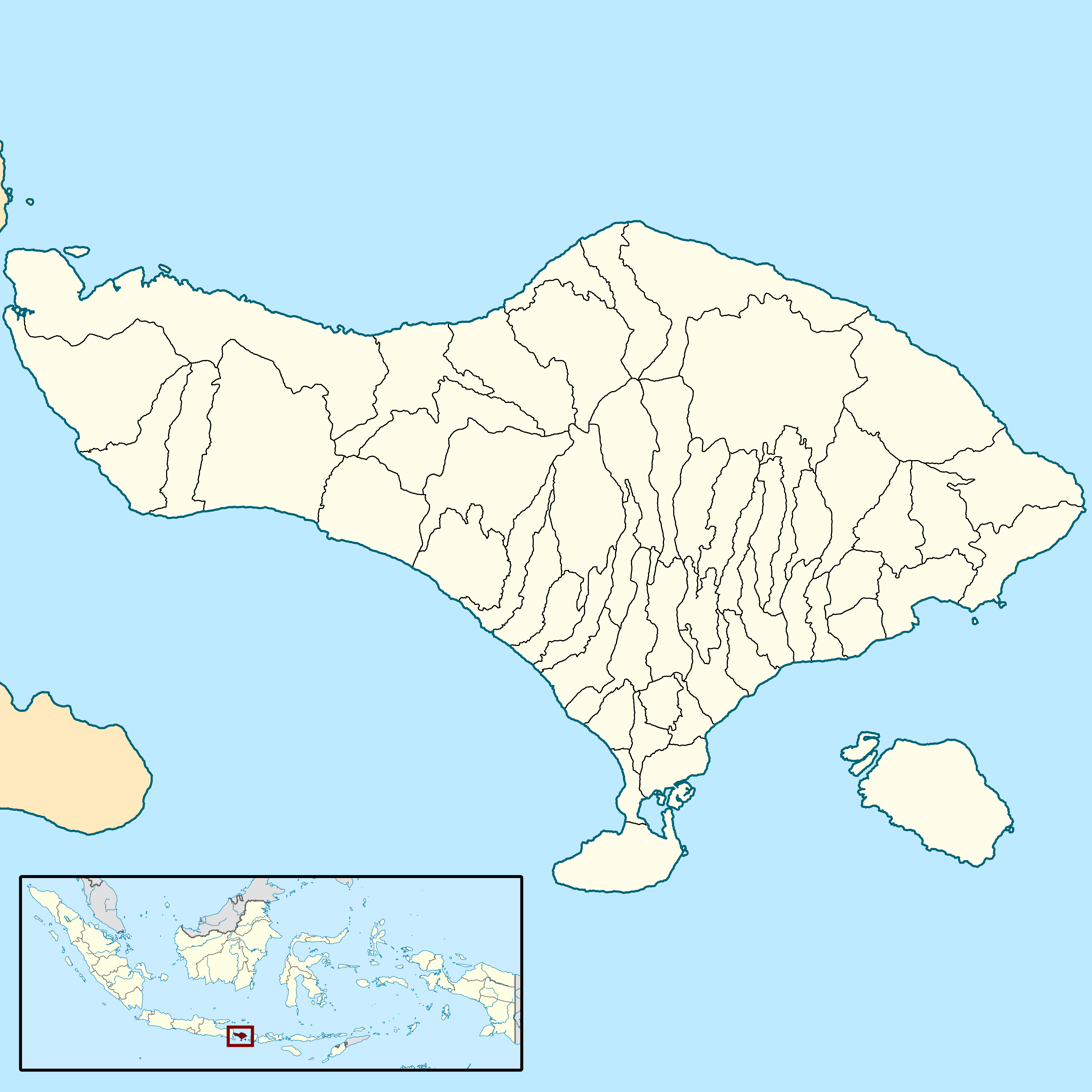
Map of districts (kecamatan) of Bali

The province is divided into eight regencies (kabupaten) and one city (kota) together divided into 57 districts (kecamatan), in turn sub-divided into 80 urban villages (kelurahan) and 636 rural villages (desa); all the regencies were originally inaugurated on 9 August 1958, while the city of Denpasar were created from part of Badung Regency on 15 January 1992. They are tabulated below with their areas and their populations at the 2010 census and the 2020 census, together with the official estimates as at mid 2025 and the Human Development Index for each regency and city.

Kode Wilayah	Name of City or Regency	Capital	Area in km^{2}	Pop'n 2000 Census	Pop'n 2010 Census	Pop'n 2020 Census	Pop'n mid 2025 Estimate	HDI 2023 estimate
51.01	Jembrana Regency	Negara	849.13	231,806	261,638	317,064	325,600	0.740 (High)
51.02	Tabanan Regency	Singasana	846.54	376,030	420,913	461,630	467,700	0.774 (High)
51.03	Badung Regency	Mangupura	397.40	345,863	543,332	548,191	568,500	0.831 (Very High)
51.04	Gianyar Regency	Gianyar	363.78	393,155	469,777	515,344	527,100	0.792 (High)
51.05	Klungkung Regency	Semarapura	312.12	155,262	170,543	206,925	209,300	0.731 (High)
51.06	Bangli Regency	Bangli	526.76	193,776	215,353	258,721	262,300	0.708 (High)
51.07	Karangasem Regency	Amlapura	838.90	360,486	396,487	492,402	502,300	0.709 (High)
51.08	Buleleng Regency	Singaraja	1,322.12	558,181	624,125	791,813	814,800	0.740 (High)
51.71	Denpasar City	–	125.69	532,440	788,589	725,314	755,600	0.847 (Very High)
	Totals		5,582.83	3,146,999	3,890,757	4,317,404	4,461,260	0.771 (High)

The province forms one of Indonesia's 84 national electoral districts to elect members to the Indonesian parliament. The Bali Electoral District consists of all of the 8 regencies in the province, together with the city of Denpasar, and elects 9 members to the People's Representative Council.

== Economy ==
In the 1970s, the Balinese economy was largely agriculture-based in terms of both output and employment. Tourism is now the largest single industry in terms of income, and as a result, Bali is one of Indonesia's wealthiest regions. In 2003, around 80% of Bali's economy was tourism related. By the end of June 2011, the rate of non-performing loans of all banks in Bali were 2.23%, lower than the average of Indonesian banking industry non-performing loan rates (about 5%). The economy, however, suffered significantly as a result of the terrorist bombings in 2002 and 2005. The tourism industry has since recovered from these events.

=== Agriculture ===
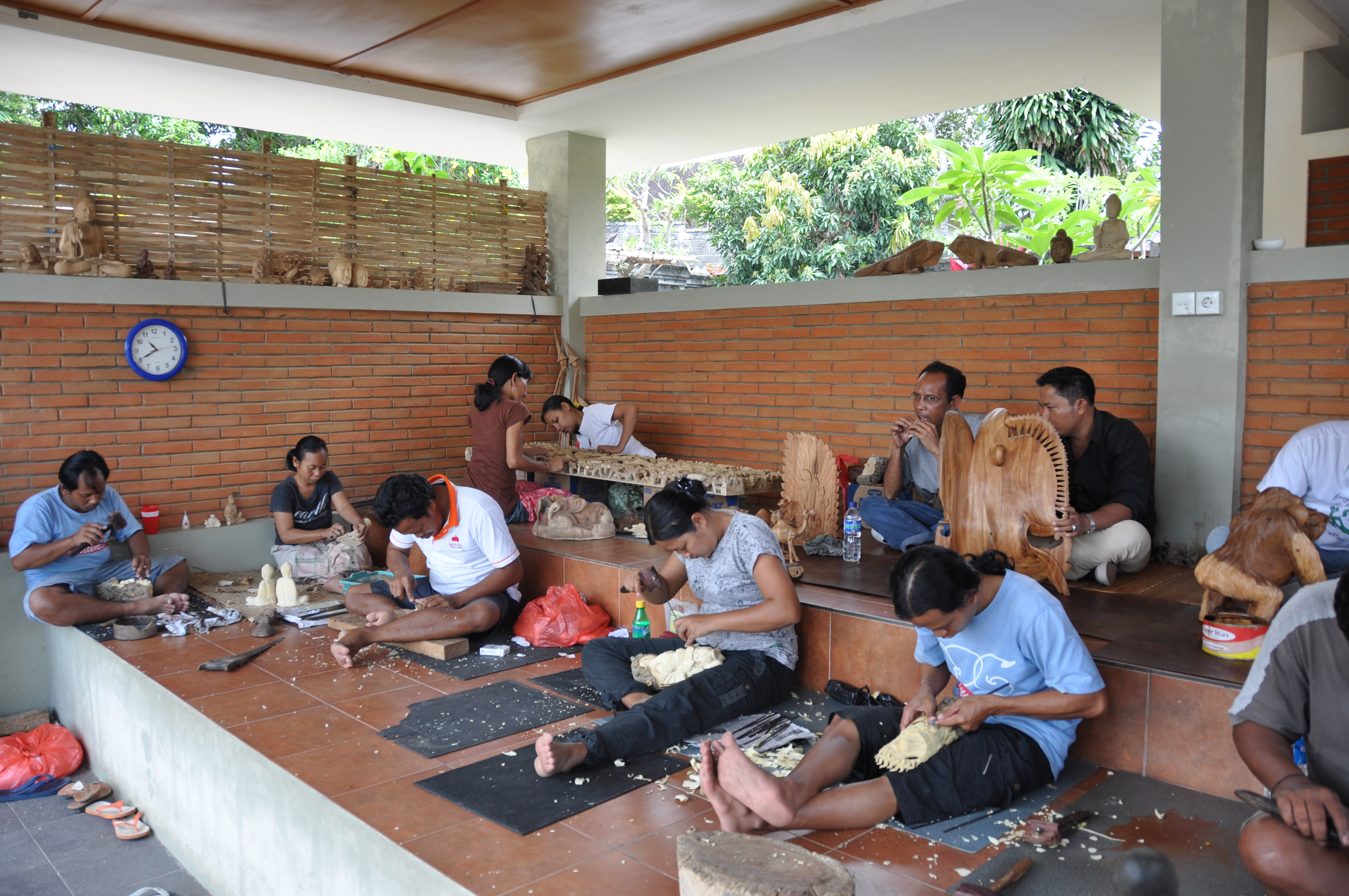
Wood carving

Although tourism produces the GDP's largest output, agriculture is still the island's biggest employer. Fishing also provides a significant number of jobs. Bali is also famous for its artisans who produce a vast array of handicrafts, including batik and ikat cloth and clothing, wooden carvings, stone carvings, painted art and silverware. Notably, individual villages typically adopt a single product, such as wind chimes or wooden furniture.

The Arabica coffee production region is the highland region of Kintamani near Mount Batur. Generally, Balinese coffee is processed using the wet method. This results in a sweet, soft coffee with good consistency. Typical flavours include lemon and other citrus notes. Many coffee farmers in Kintamani are members of a traditional farming system called Subak Abian, which is based on the Hindu philosophy of "Tri Hita Karana". According to this philosophy, the three causes of happiness are good relations with God, other people, and the environment. The Subak Abian system is ideally suited to the production of fair trade and organic coffee production. Arabica coffee from Kintamani is the first product in Indonesia to request a geographical indication.

=== Tourism ===
In 2025, Bali received 6,948,754 international tourists, an increase of 9.72% compared to 2024.

Number of tourists by nationality in 2025
No.	Country	Tourists
1	Australia	1,630,000
2	India	569,260
3	China	537,380
4	South Korea	346,680
5	United Kingdom	317,520
6	France	279,120
7	United States	274,610
8	Malaysia	251,160
9	Singapore	211,330
10	Japan	208,620
As of 2025

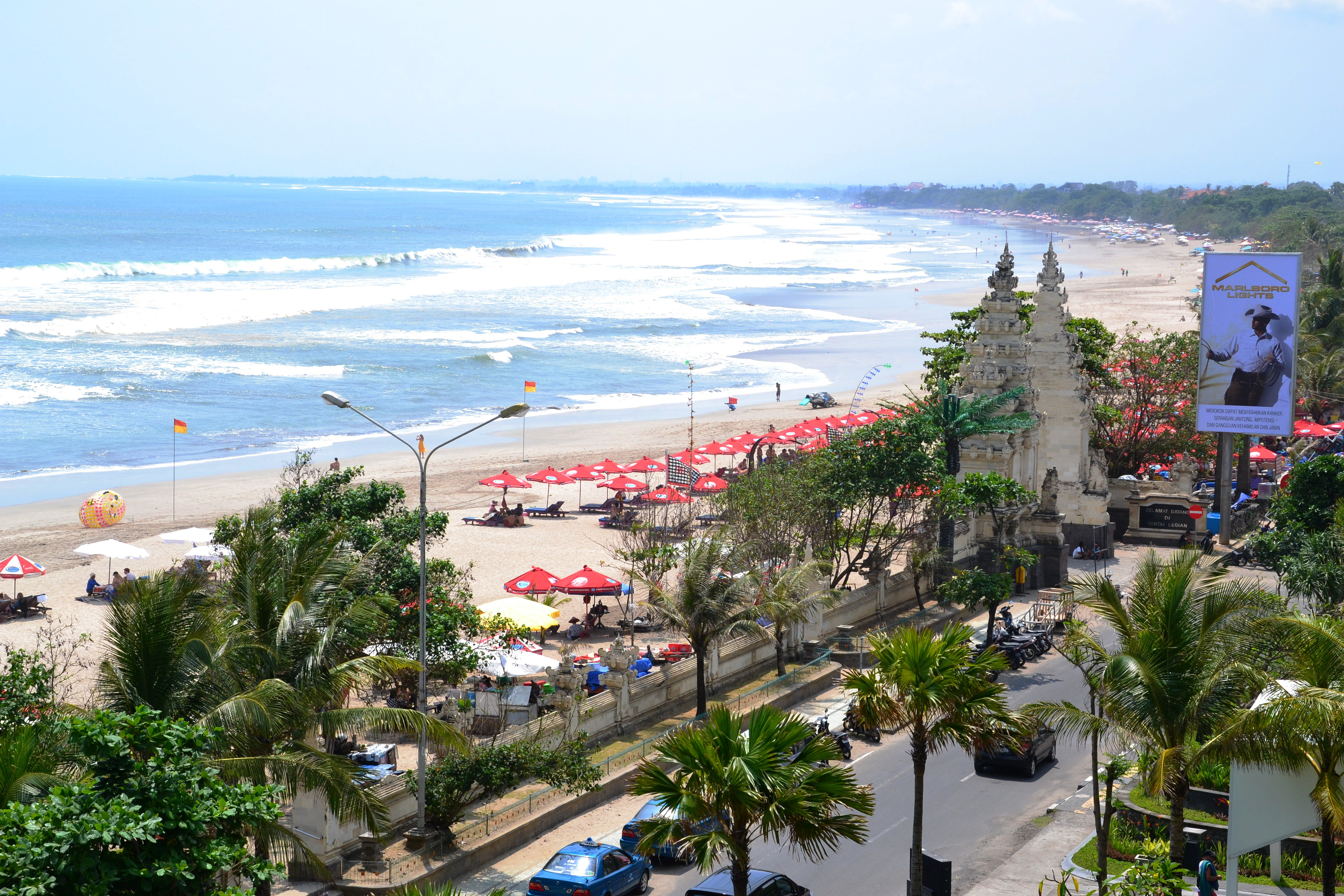
Kuta Beach is a popular tourist spot.

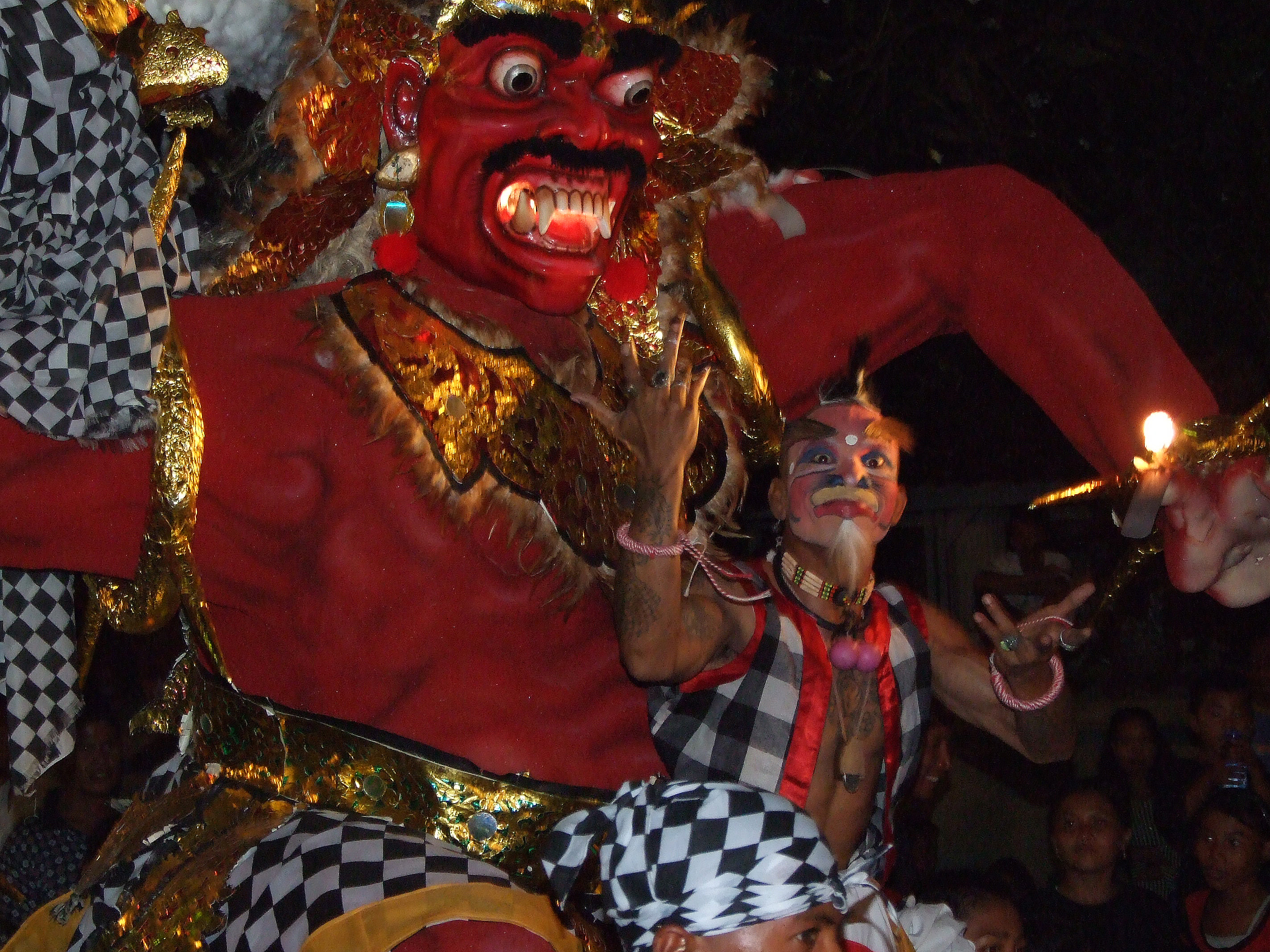
Ogoh-ogoh procession on the eve of Nyepi

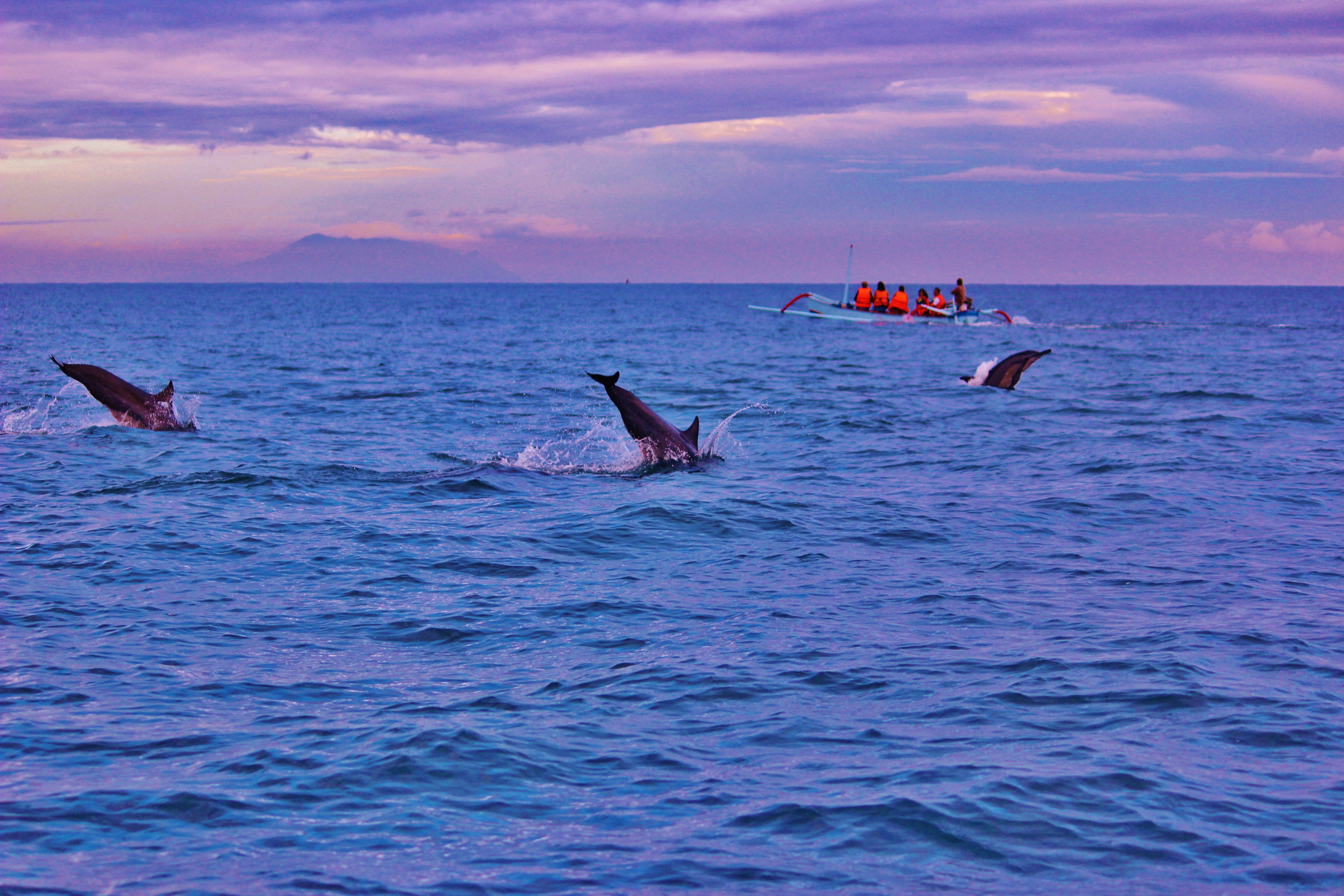
Dolphins and sunrise in Lovina

In 1963, the Bali Beach Hotel in Sanur was built by Sukarno and boosted tourism in Bali. Before the Bali Beach Hotel construction, there were only three significant tourist-class hotels on the island. Construction of hotels and restaurants began to spread throughout Bali. Tourism further increased in Bali after the Ngurah Rai International Airport opened in 1970. The Buleleng regency government encouraged the tourism sector as one of the mainstays for economic progress and social welfare.

The tourism industry is primarily focused in the south, while also significant in the other parts of the island. The prominent tourist locations are the town of Kuta (with its beach), and its outer suburbs of Legian and Seminyak (which were once independent townships), the east coast town of Sanur (once the only tourist hub), Ubud towards the centre of the island, to the south of the Ngurah Rai International Airport, Jimbaran and the newer developments of Nusa Dua and Pecatu.

The United States government lifted its travel warnings in 2008. The Australian government issued an advisory on Friday, 4 May 2012, with the overall level of this advisory lowered to 'Exercise a high degree of caution'. The Swedish government issued a new warning on Sunday, 10 June 2012, because of one tourist who died from methanol poisoning. Australia last issued an advisory on Monday, 5 January 2015, due to new terrorist threats.

An offshoot of tourism is the growing real estate industry. Bali's real estate has been rapidly developing in the main tourist areas of Kuta, Legian, Seminyak, and Oberoi. Most recently, high-end 5-star projects are under development on the Bukit peninsula, on the island's south side. Expensive villas are being developed along the cliff sides of south Bali, with commanding panoramic ocean views. Foreign and domestic, many Jakarta individuals and companies are fairly active, and investment into other areas of the island also continues to grow. Land prices, despite the worldwide economic crisis, have remained stable.

In the last half of 2008, Indonesia's currency had dropped approximately 30% against the US dollar, providing many overseas visitors with improved value for their currencies.

Bali's tourism economy survived the terrorist bombings of 2002 and 2005, and the tourism industry has slowly recovered and surpassed its pre-terrorist bombing levels; the long-term trend has been a steady increase in visitor arrivals. In 2010, Bali received 2.57 million foreign tourists, which surpassed the target of 2.0–2.3 million tourists. The average occupancy of starred hotels achieved 65%, so the island still should be able to accommodate tourists for some years without any addition of new rooms/hotels, although at the peak season some of them are fully booked.

Bali received the Best Island award from Travel and Leisure in 2010. Bali won because of its attractive surroundings (both mountain and coastal areas), diverse tourist attractions, excellent international and local restaurants, and the friendliness of the local people. The Balinese culture and its religion are also considered the main factor of the award. One of the most prestigious events that symbolize a strong relationship between a god and its followers is Kecak dance. According to BBC Travel released in 2011, Bali is one of the World's Best Islands, ranking second after Santorini, Greece.

In 2006, Elizabeth Gilbert's memoir Eat, Pray, Love was published, and in August 2010 it was adapted into the film Eat Pray Love. It took place at Ubud and Padang-Padang Beach in Bali. Both the book and the film fuelled a boom in tourism in Ubud, the hill town and cultural and tourist centre that was the focus of Gilbert's quest for balance and love through traditional spirituality and healing.

In January 2016, after musician David Bowie died, it was revealed that in his will, Bowie asked for his ashes to be scattered in Bali, conforming to Buddhist rituals. He had visited and performed in several Southeast Asian cities early in his career, including Bangkok and Singapore.

Since 2011, China has displaced Japan as the second-largest supplier of tourists to Bali, while Australia still tops the list while India has also emerged as a greater supplier of tourists. Chinese tourists increased by 17% in 2011 from 2010 due to the impact of ACFTA and new direct flights to Bali. In January 2012, Chinese tourists increased by 222.18% compared to January 2011, while Japanese tourists declined by 23.54% year on year. Bali is a very popular tourist destination for Indians.

Bali authorities reported the island had 2.88 million foreign tourists and 5 million domestic tourists in 2012, marginally surpassing the expectations of 2.8 million foreign tourists.

Based on a Bank Indonesia survey in May 2013, 34.39 per cent of tourists are upper-middle class, spending between $1,286 and $5,592, and are dominated by Australia, India, France, China, Germany and the UK. Some Chinese tourists have increased their levels of spending from previous years. 30.26 per cent of tourists are middle class, spending between $662 and $1,285. In 2017 it was expected that Chinese tourists would outnumber Australian tourists.

In January 2020, 10,000 Chinese tourists cancelled trips to Bali due to the COVID-19 pandemic. Because of the COVID-19 pandemic travel restrictions, Bali welcomed 1.07 million international travelers in 2020, most of them between January and March, which is −87% compared to 2019. In the first half of 2021, they welcomed 43 international travelers. The pandemic presented a major blow on Bali's tourism-dependent economy. On 3 February 2022, Bali reopened again for the first foreign tourists after 2 years of being closed due to the pandemic.

In 2022 Indonesia's Minister of Health, Budi Sadikin, stated that the tourism industry in Bali will be complemented by the medical industry.

At the beginning of 2023, the governor of Bali demanded a ban on the use of motorcycles by tourists. This happened after a series of accidents. Wayan Koster proposed to cancel the violators' visas. The move sparked widespread outrage on social media.

== Transportation ==
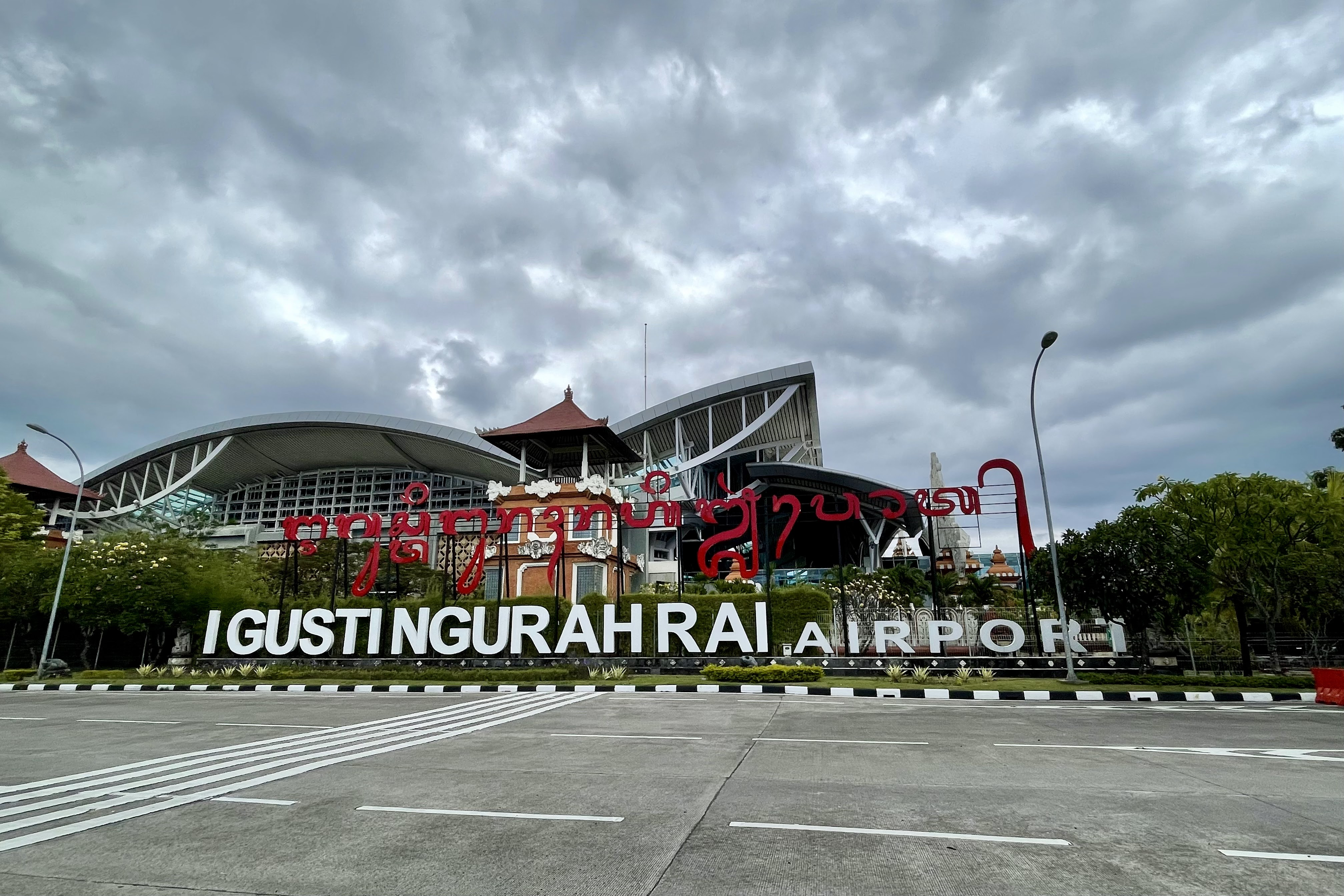
I Gusti Ngurah Rai International Airport

The Ngurah Rai International Airport is located near Jimbaran, on the isthmus at the southernmost part of the island. Lt. Col. Wisnu Airfield is in northwest Bali.

A coastal road circles the island, and three major two-lane arteries cross the central mountains at passes reaching 1,750 m in height (at Penelokan). The Ngurah Rai Bypass is a four-lane expressway that partly encircles Denpasar. Bali has no railway lines. There is a car ferry between Gilimanuk on the west coast of Bali to Ketapang on Java which started running in the 1930s.

Two bus systems exist: Trans Sarbagita and Trans Metro Dewata.

In December 2010 the Government of Indonesia invited investors to build a new Tanah Ampo Cruise Terminal at Karangasem, Bali with a projected worth of $30 million. On 17 July 2011, the first cruise ship (Sun Princess) anchored about 400 metres (1,300 feet) away from the wharf of Tanah Ampo harbour. The current pier is only 154 metres (505 feet) but will eventually be extended to 300 to 350 metres (980–1,150 feet) to accommodate international cruise ships. The harbour is safer than the existing facility at Benoa and has a scenic backdrop of east Bali mountains and green rice fields. The tender for improvement was subject to delays, and as of July 2013 the situation was unclear with cruise line operators complaining and even refusing to use the existing facility at Tanah Ampo.

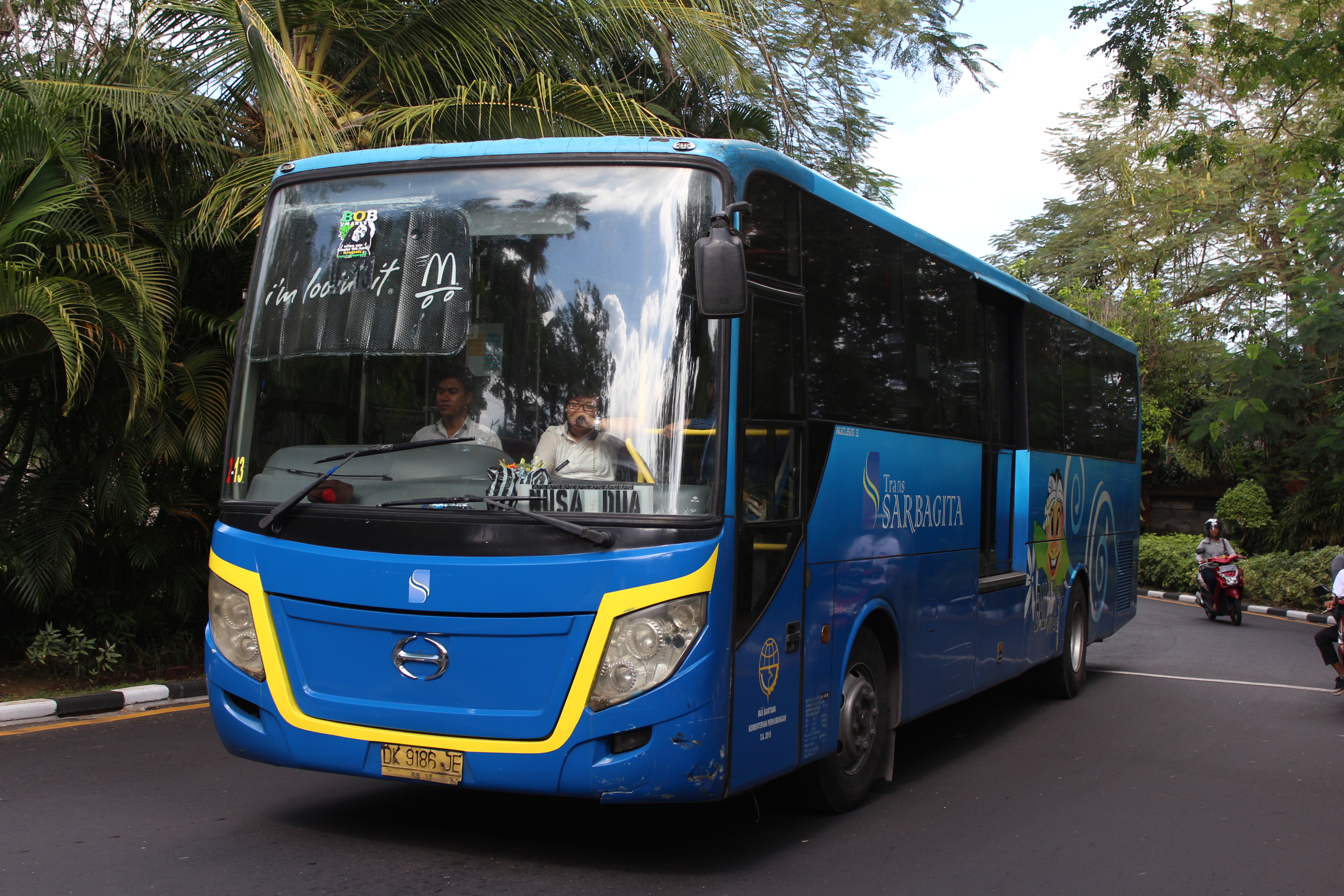
Trans Sarbagita bus

A memorandum of understanding was signed by two ministers, Bali's governor and Indonesian Train Company to build 565 kilometres (351 miles) of railway along the coast around the island. As of July 2015, no details of these proposed railways have been released. In 2019 it was reported in Gapura Bali that Wayan Koster, governor of Bali, "is keen to improve Bali's transportation infrastructure and is considering plans to build an electric rail network across the island".

On 16 March 2011 (Tanjung) Benoa port received the "Best Port Welcome 2010" award from London's "Dream World Cruise Destination" magazine. Government plans to expand the role of Benoa port as export-import port to boost Bali's trade and industry sector. In 2013, The Tourism and Creative Economy Ministry advised that 306 cruise liners were scheduled to visit Indonesia, an increase of 43 per cent compared to the previous year.

In May 2011, an integrated Area Traffic Control System (ATCS) was implemented to reduce traffic jams at four crossing points: Ngurah Rai statue, Dewa Ruci Kuta crossing, Jimbaran crossing and Sanur crossing. ATCS is an integrated system connecting all traffic lights, CCTVs and other traffic signals with a monitoring office at the police headquarters. It has successfully been implemented in other ASEAN countries and will be implemented at other crossings in Bali.

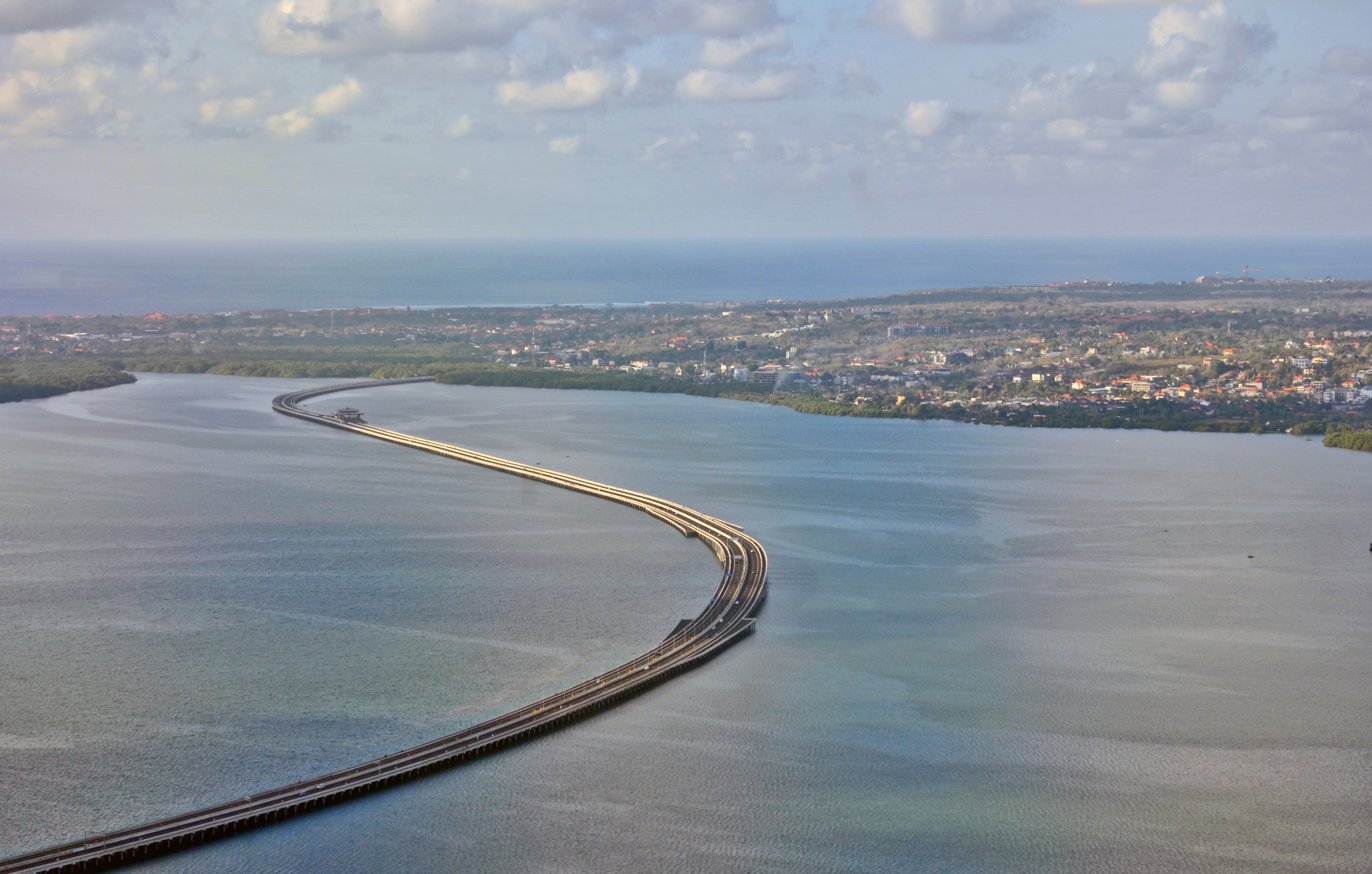
Bali Mandara Toll Road view above the sea

On 21 December 2011, construction started on the Nusa Dua-Benoa-Ngurah Rai International Airport toll road, which will also provide a special lane for motorcycles. This has been done by seven state-owned enterprises led by PT Jasa Marga with 60% of the shares. PT Jasa Marga Bali Tol will construct the 9.91-kilometre-long (6.16-mile) toll road (totally 12.7 kilometres (7.89 miles) with access road). The construction is estimated to cost Rp.2.49 trillion ($273.9 million). The project goes through 2 kilometres (1 mile) of mangrove forest and through 2.3 kilometres (1.4 miles) of beach, both within 5.4 hectares (13 acres) area. The elevated toll road is built over the mangrove forest on 18,000 concrete pillars that occupied two hectares of mangrove forest. This was compensated by the planting of 300,000 mangrove trees along the road. On 21 December 2011, the Dewa Ruci 450-metre (1,480-foot) underpass has also started on the busy Dewa Ruci junction near Bali Kuta Galeria with an estimated cost of Rp136 billion ($14.9 million) from the state budget. On 23 September 2013, the Bali Mandara Toll Road was opened, with the Dewa Ruci Junction underpass being opened previously.

To solve chronic traffic problems, the province will also build a toll road connecting Serangan with Tohpati, a toll road connecting Kuta, Denpasar, and Tohpati, and a flyover connecting Kuta and Ngurah Rai Airport.

== Demographics ==
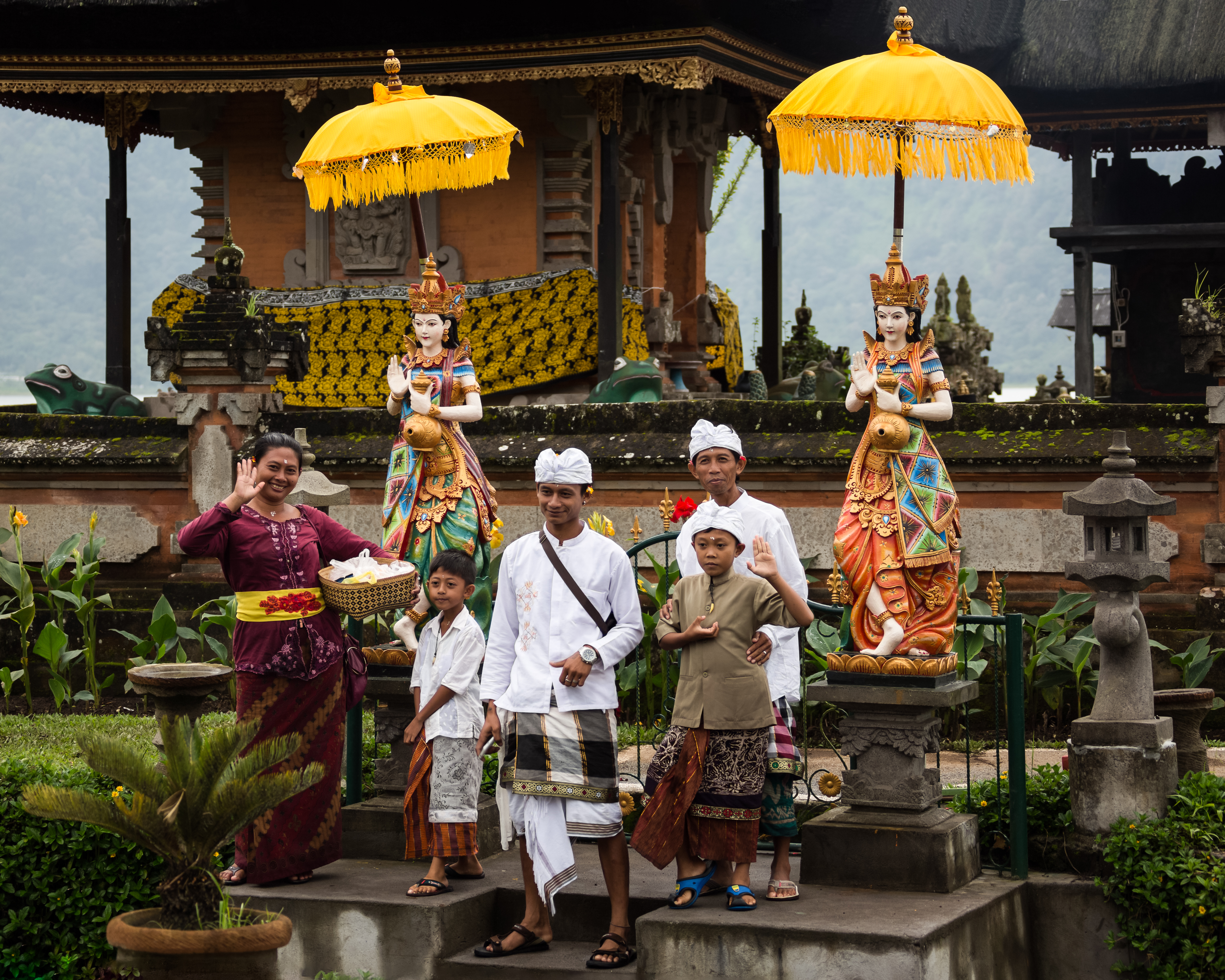
Balinese family after performing puja in a temple

Historical population
Year	Pop.	±%
1971	2,120,322	—
1980	2,469,930	+16.5%
1990	2,777,811	+12.5%
1995	2,895,649	+4.2%
2000	3,146,999	+8.7%
2005	3,378,092	+7.3%
2010	3,890,757	+15.2%
2015	4,148,588	+6.6%
2020	4,317,404	+4.1%
2024	4,461,260	+3.3%

The population of Bali was 3,890,757 according to the 2010 census, and 4,317,404 at the 2020 census; the official estimate as at mid 2024 was 4,461,260 (comprising 2,222,440 males and 2,210,820 females). In 2021, the Indonesian Ministry of Tourism estimated that there were 109,801 foreigners living on Bali, with most originating from Russia, United States, Australia, United Kingdom, Germany, Japan, France, Italy, India, and the Netherlands.

=== Ethnic groups ===
==== Ethnic origins ====
A DNA study in 2005 by Karafet et al., found that 84% of Balinese Y-chromosomes are of likely Austronesian origin, 12% of likely Indian origin and 2% of likely Melanesian origin. According to a recent genetic study, the Balinese, together with the Javanese and Sundanese, have a significant admixture of Austroasiatic and Austronesian ancestries.

==== Ethnicity ====
The majority of the population inhabiting the province of Bali are the local ethnic, namely the Balinese and indigenous Bali Aga people. The Balinese have a cultural richness that is known worldwide, so that Bali is the main destination for foreign tourists to Indonesia. In addition to the rich beaches, the culture that is of interest in Bali is its dances, such as the Kecak dance, festivals such as Ogoh-ogoh, and others. The largest ethnic group outside the Balinese people is the Javanese people.

Based on data from the 2010 Indonesian population census, the following is the composition of ethnic groups in the province of Bali:

No.	Ethnic groups	Pop. (2010)	Pct. (%)
1	Balinese	3,336,065	85.97%
2	Javanese	372,514	9.60%
3	Madurese	29,864	0.77%
4	Malays	22,926	0.59%
5	Sasak	22,672	0.58%
6	From East Nusa Tenggara	19,698	0.51%
7	Chinese	14,970	0.38%
8	Sundanese	11,630	0.30%
9	Bugis	9,287	0.24%
10	Batak	6,489	0.17%
11	Others	34,609	0.89%
	Bali Province	3,880,724	100%

=== Caste system ===
Pre-modern Bali had four castes, but with a "very strong tradition of communal decision-making and interdependence". The four castes have been classified as Sudra (Shudra), Wesia (Vaishyas), Satria (Kshatriyas) and Brahmana (Brahmin).

The 19th-century scholars such as Crawfurd and Friederich suggested that the Balinese caste system had Indian origins, but Helen Creese states that scholars such as Brumund who had visited and stayed on the island suggested that his field observations conflicted with the "received understandings concerning its Indian origins". In Bali, the Shudra (locally spelt Soedra) has typically been the temple priests, though depending on the demographics, a temple priest may also be from the other three castes. In most regions, it has been the Shudra who typically make offerings to the gods on behalf of the Hindu devotees, chant prayers, recite meweda (Vedas), and set the course of Balinese temple festivals.

=== Religion ===
Religion in Bali (2024)
1. Hinduism (86.4%)
2. Islam (10.3%)
3. Christianity (2.62%)
4. Buddhism (0.68%)
5. other (0.02%)

About 86.40% of Bali's population adheres to Balinese Hinduism, formed as a combination of existing local beliefs and Hindu beliefs from mainland Southeast Asia and South Asia. Minority religions include Islam (10.16%), Christianity (2.55%) (1.76%: Protestantism; 0.86%: Catholicism), and Buddhism (0.68%) as for 2022.

The Balinese people and Bali Aga are generally Hindu with some being Muslim (3.24%) and Christian (1.26%). The Javanese, Sundanese, Sasak, and Malay people are generally Muslim and some are also Hindu or Christian. Meanwhile, people from East Nusa Tenggara, as well as people of the Papua, Batak, Chinese and some other Indonesian ethnic groups that aren't traditionally Muslim are generally Christian, with small minority are Hindu and Muslim. The village of Blimbing Sari in the Melaya district of Jembrana Regency, not far from Gilimanuk Port, is Christian, and the residents there are native Balinese, but the church is shaped like a Hindu temple.

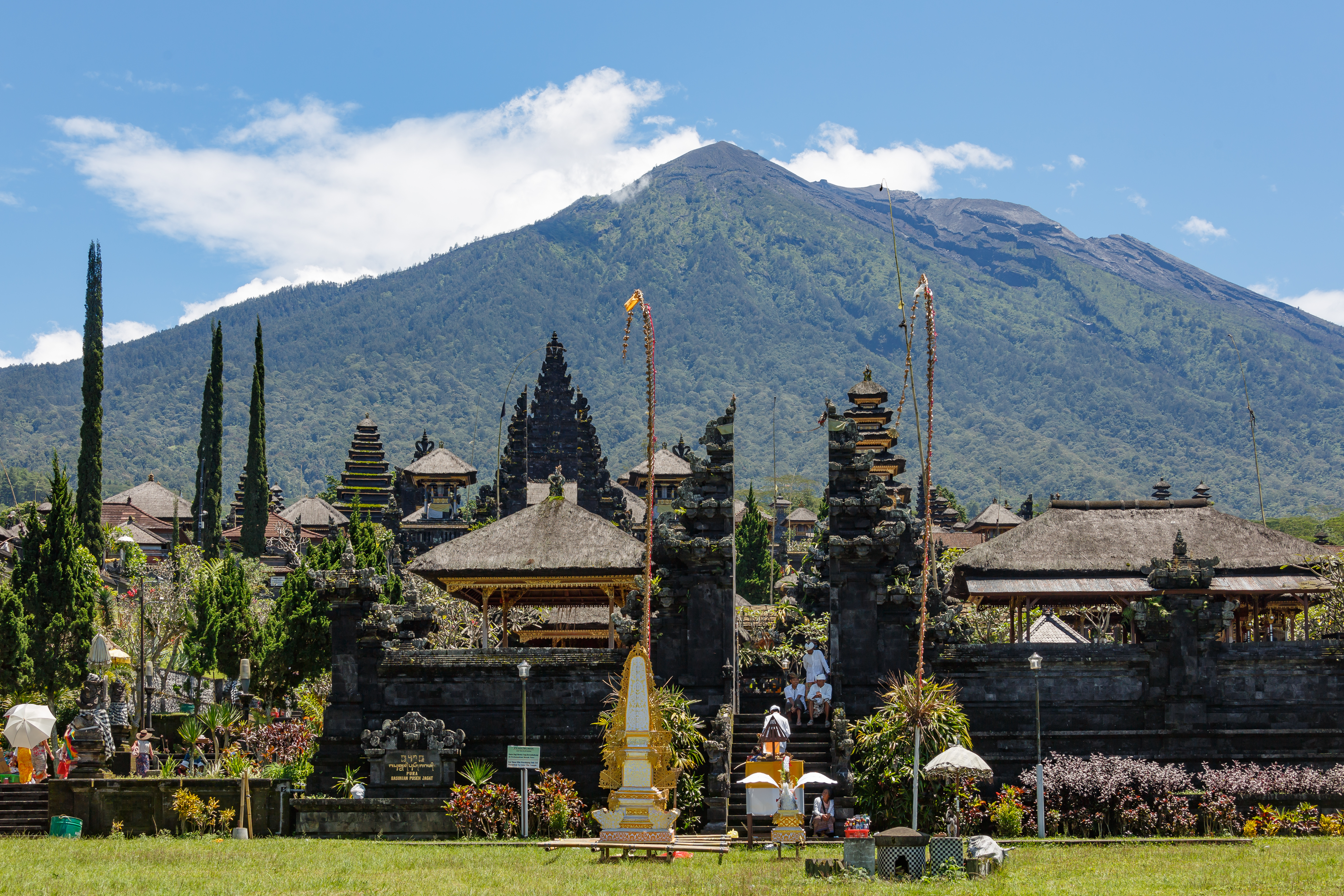
The Mother Temple of Besakih, one of Bali's most significant Hindu temples.

The general beliefs and practices of Agama Hindu Dharma mix ancient traditions and contemporary pressures placed by Indonesian laws that permit only monotheist belief under the national ideology of Pancasila. Traditionally, Hinduism in Indonesia had a pantheon of deities and that tradition of belief continues in practice; further, Hinduism in Indonesia granted freedom and flexibility to Hindus as to when, how and where to pray. However, officially, the Indonesian government considers and advertises Indonesian Hinduism as a monotheistic religion with certain officially recognised beliefs that comply with its national ideology. Indonesian school textbooks describe Hinduism as having one supreme being, Hindus offering three daily mandatory prayers, and Hinduism as having certain common beliefs that in part parallel those of Islam. Some scholars contest whether these Indonesian government recognised and assigned beliefs to reflect the traditional beliefs and practices of Hindus in Indonesia before Indonesia gained independence from Dutch colonial rule.

Balinese Hinduism has roots in Indian Hinduism and Buddhism, which arrived through Java. Hindu influences reached the Indonesian Archipelago as early as the first century. Historical evidence is unclear about the diffusion process of cultural and spiritual ideas from India. Java legends refer to Saka-era, traced to 78 AD. Stories from the Mahabharata Epic have been traced in Indonesian islands to the 1st century; however, the versions mirror those found in the southeast Indian peninsular region (now Tamil Nadu and southern Karnataka and Andhra Pradesh).

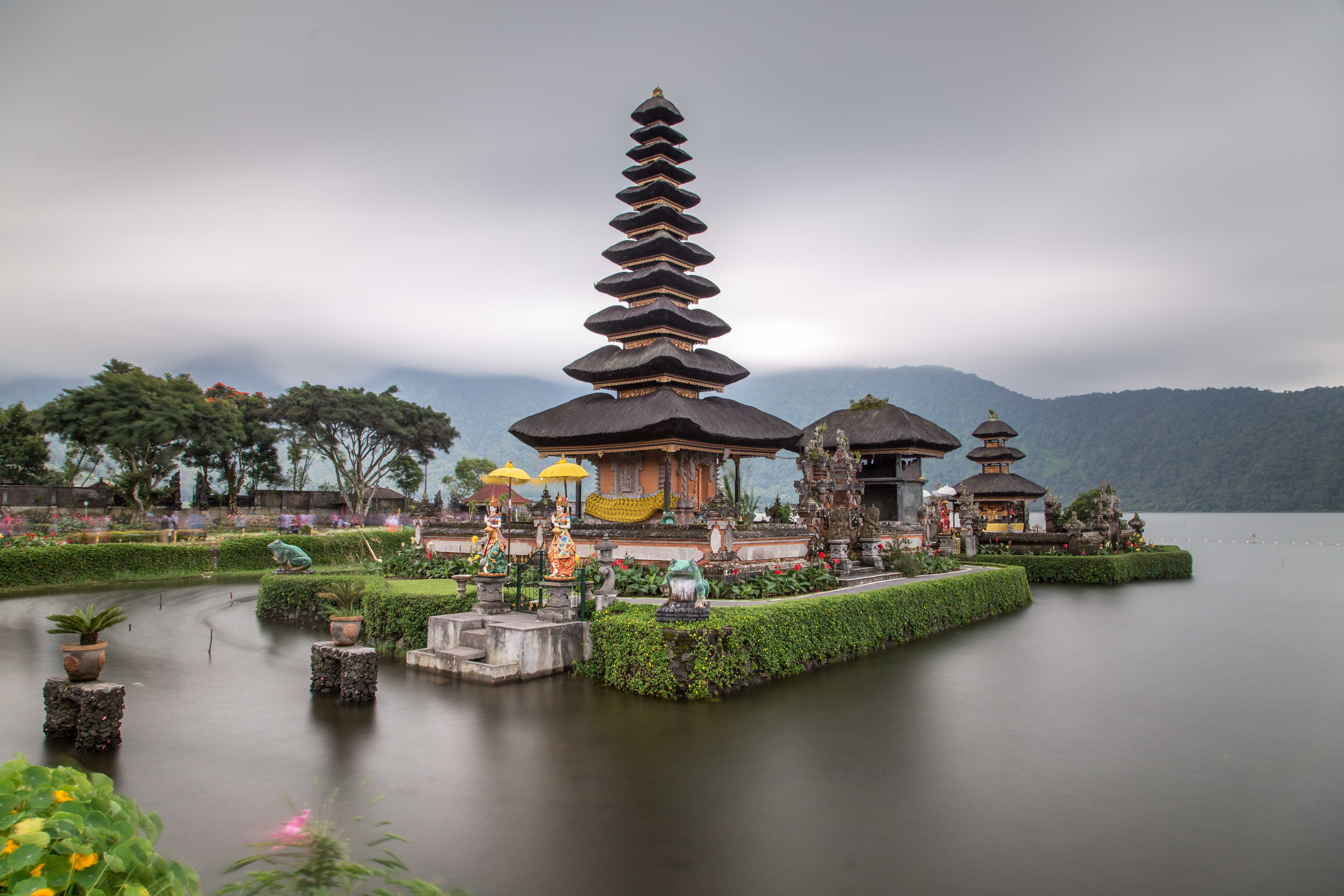
Pura Ulun Danu Bratan

The Bali tradition adopted the pre-existing animistic traditions of the indigenous people. This influence strengthened the belief that the gods and goddesses are present in all things. Every element of nature, therefore, possesses its power, which reflects the power of the gods. A rock, tree, dagger, or woven cloth is a potential home for spirits whose energy can be directed for good or evil. Balinese Hinduism is deeply interwoven with art and ritual. Ritualising states of self-control are a notable feature of religious expression among the people, who for this reason have become famous for their graceful and decorous behavior.

Apart from the majority of Balinese Hindus, there also exist Chinese immigrants whose traditions have melded with that of the locals. As a result, these Sino-Balinese embrace their original religion, which is a mixture of Buddhism, Christianity, Taoism, and Confucianism, and find a way to harmonise it with the local traditions. Hence, it is not uncommon to find local Sino-Balinese during the local temple's odalan. Moreover, Balinese Hindu priests are invited to perform rites alongside a Chinese priest in the event of the death of a Sino-Balinese. Nevertheless, the Sino-Balinese claim to embrace Buddhism for administrative purposes, such as their Identity Cards. The Roman Catholic community has a diocese, the Diocese of Denpasar that encompasses the province of Bali and West Nusa Tenggara and has its cathedral located in Denpasar.

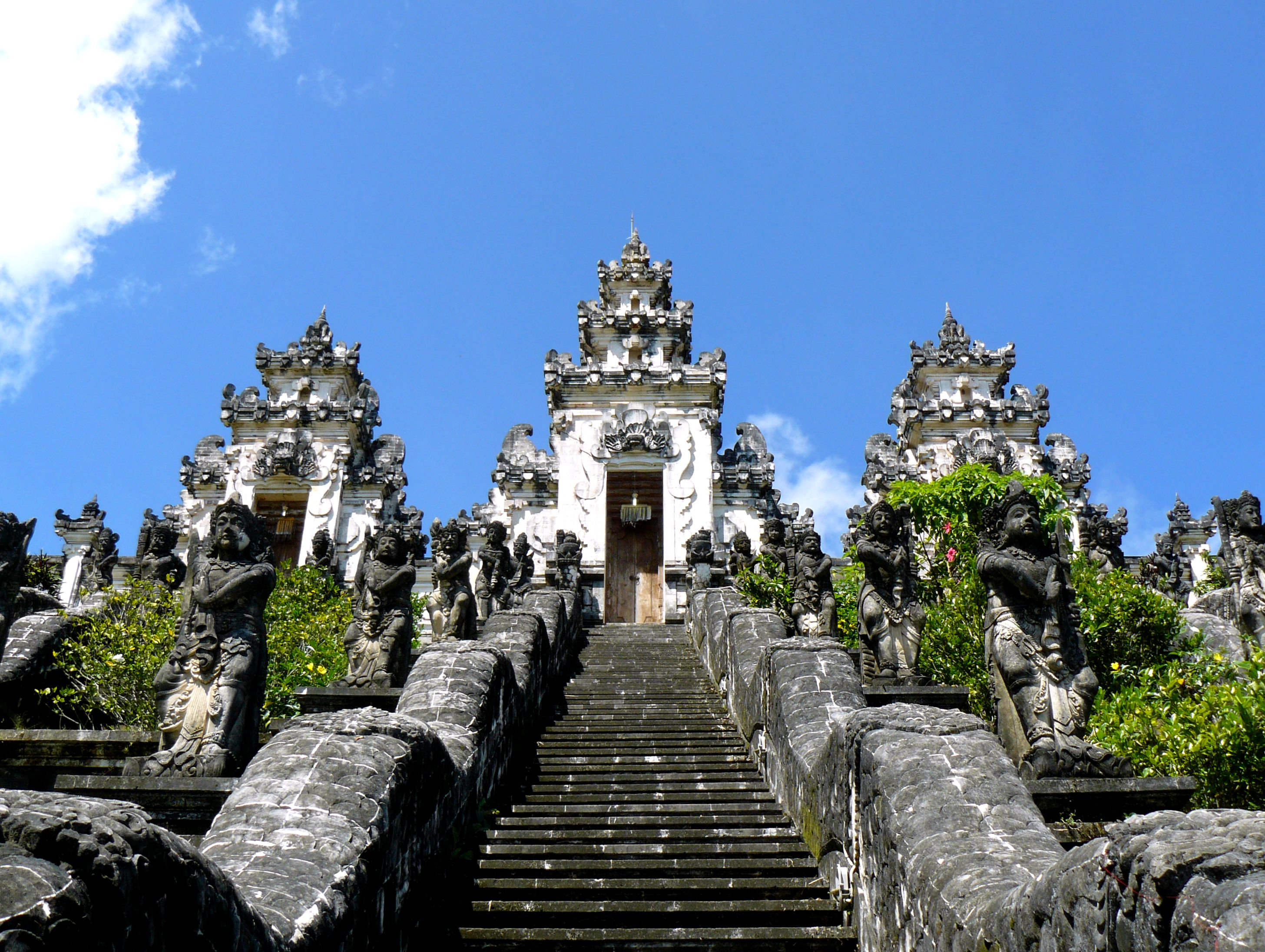
Penataran Lempuyang Temple, Gunung Lempuyang, Bali

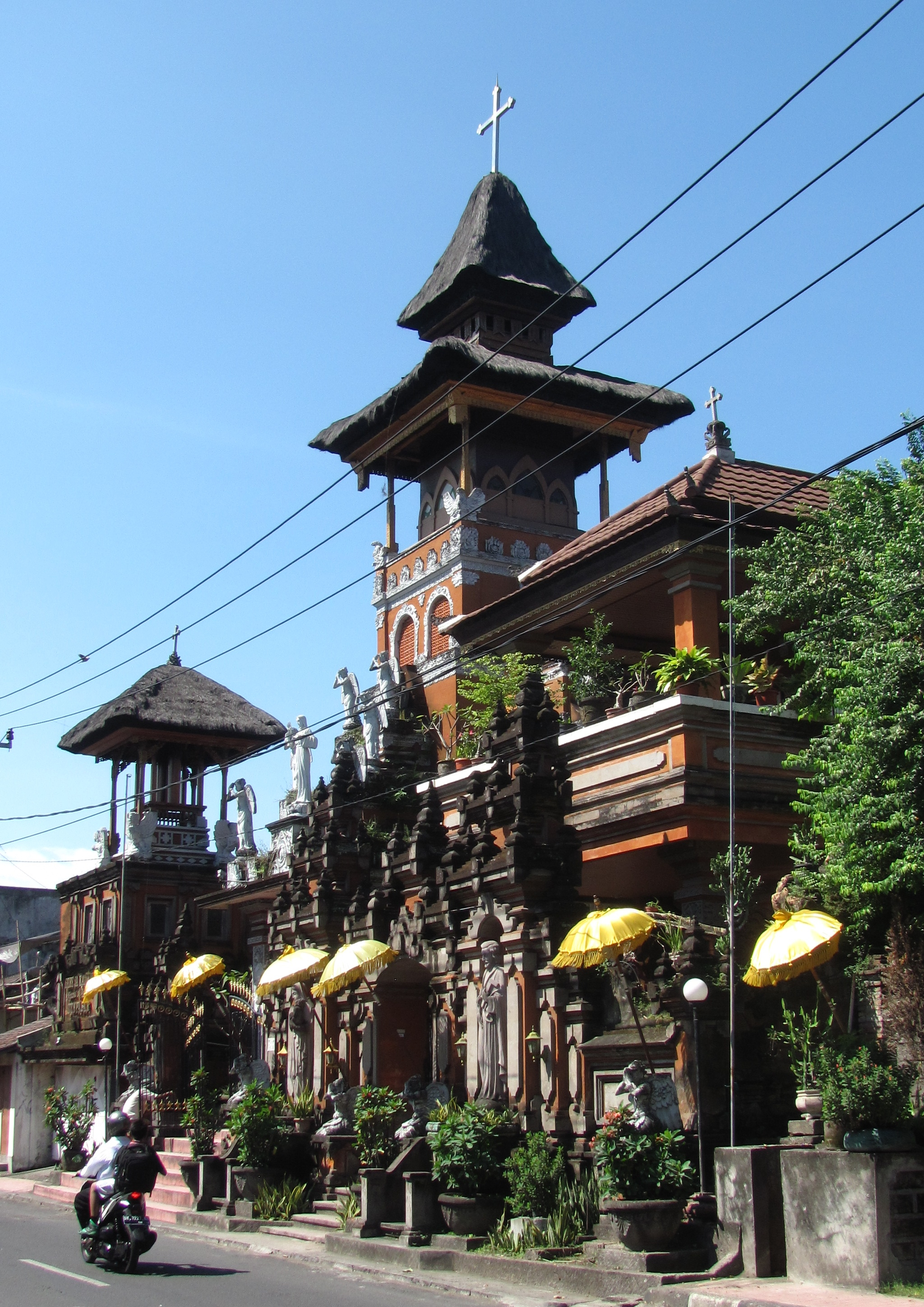
Saint Joseph's Church, Denpasar

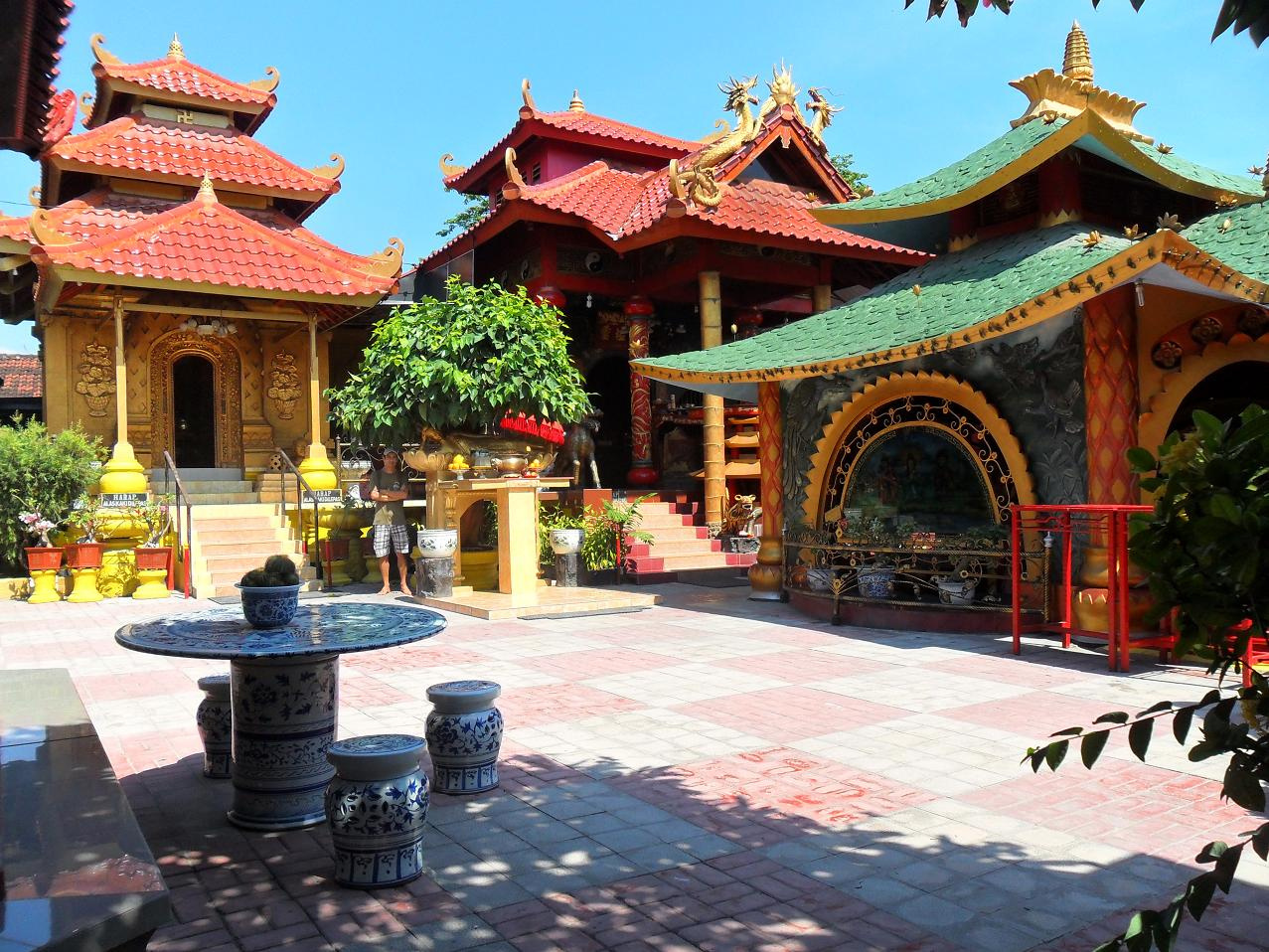
Ling Sii Miao Buddhist Temple, Denpasar

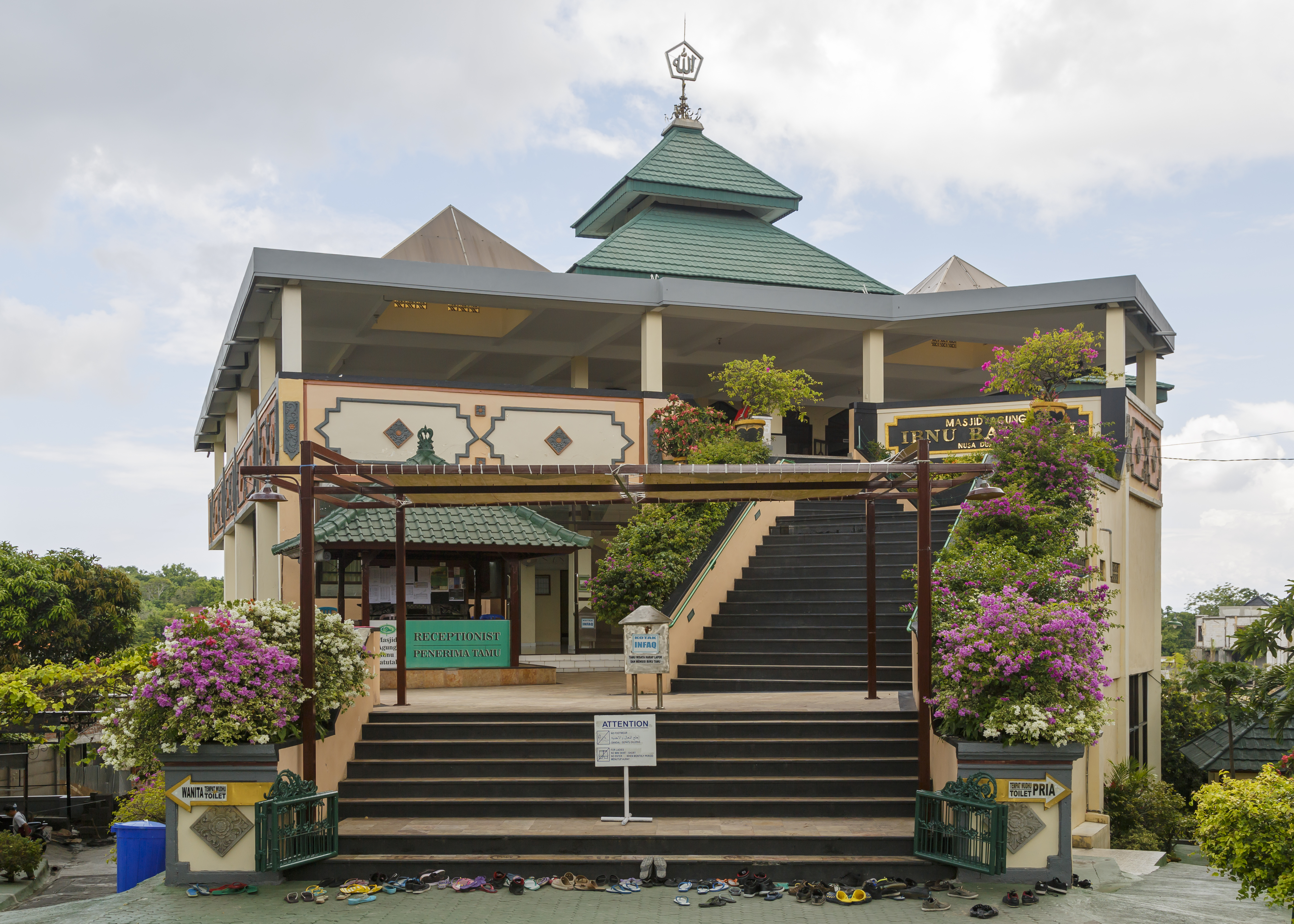
Ibnu Batutah Mosque, Kuta

=== Languages ===
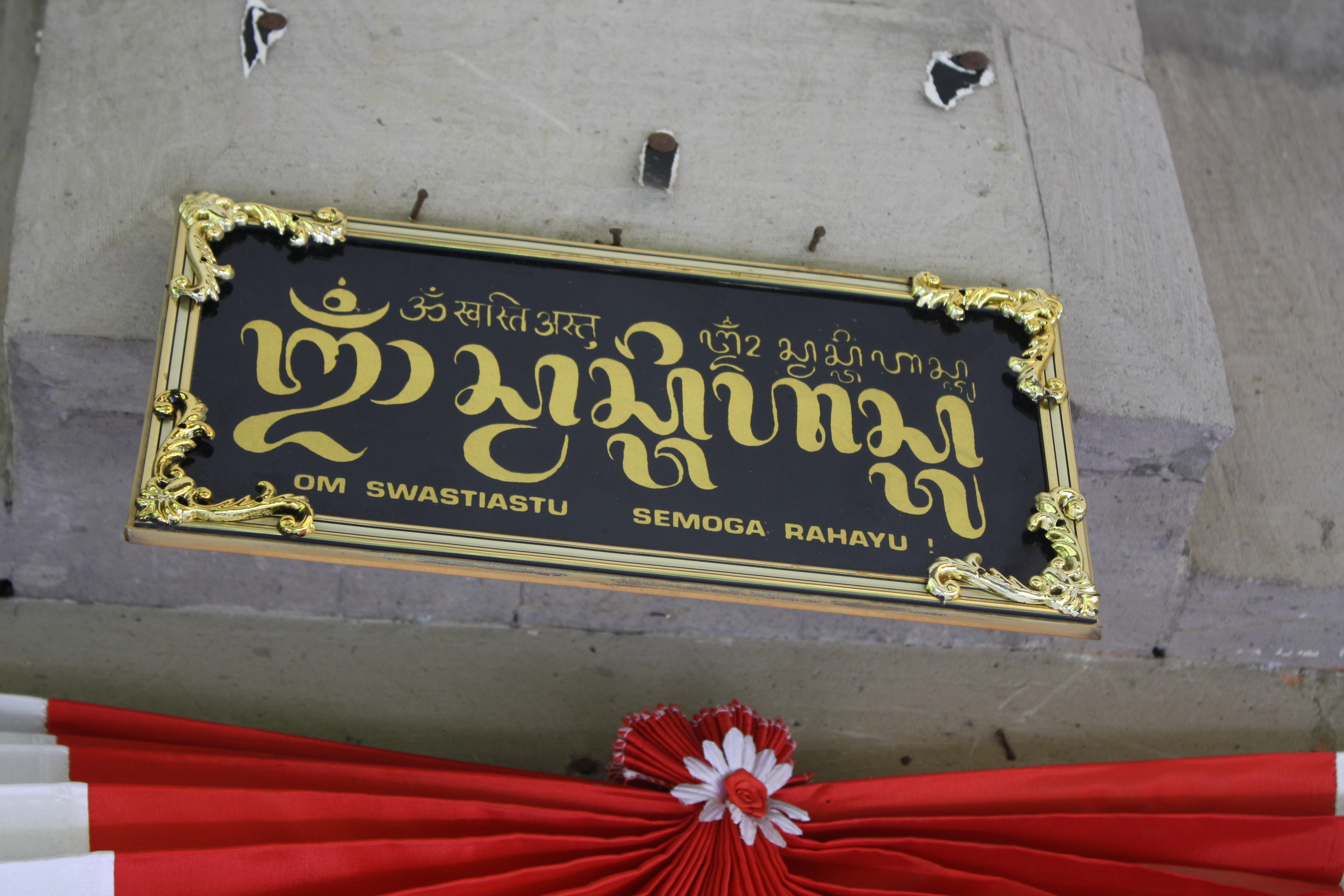
Balinese greetings "Om Swastiastu, Semoga Rahayu" in Balinese script, Latin script and Devanagari in one of the schools in Denpasar

Balinese and Indonesian are the most widely spoken languages in Bali, and the vast majority of Balinese people are bilingual or trilingual. The most common spoken language around the tourist areas is Indonesian, as many people in the tourist sector are not solely Balinese, but migrants from Java, Lombok, Sumatra, and other parts of Indonesia. The Balinese language is heavily stratified due to the Balinese caste system. Kawi and Sanskrit are also commonly used by some Hindu priests in Bali, as Hindu literature was mostly written in Sanskrit.

Balinese language

English and Chinese are the next most common languages (and the primary foreign languages) of many Balinese, owing to the requirements of the tourism industry, as well as the English-speaking community and huge Chinese-Indonesian population. Other foreign languages, such as Japanese, Korean, French, Russian or German, are often used in multilingual signs for foreign tourists.

== Culture ==
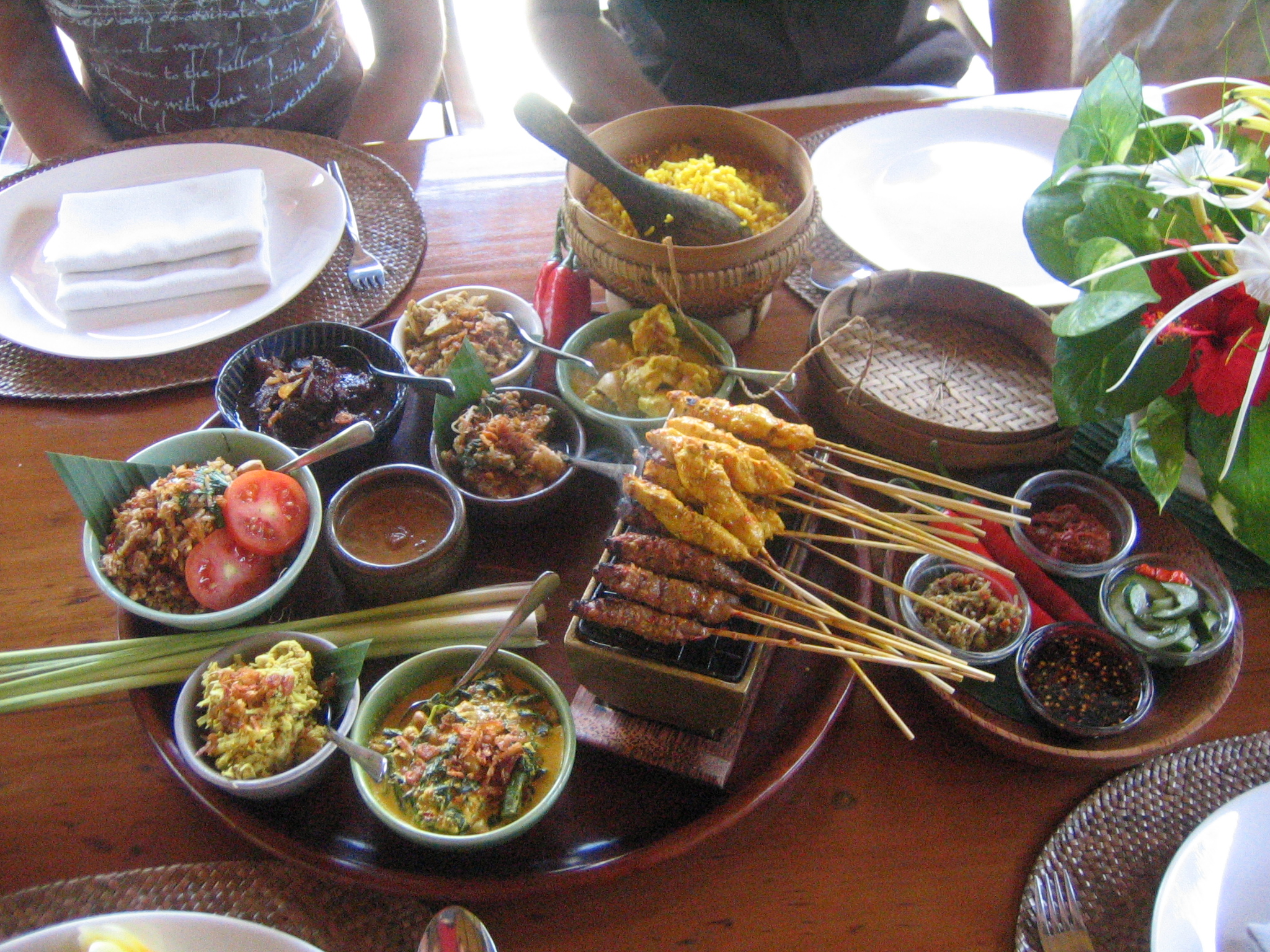
Balinese cuisine

Bali is renowned for its diverse and sophisticated art forms, such as painting, sculpture, woodcarving, handcrafts, and performing arts. Balinese cuisine is also distinctive, and unlike the rest of Indonesia, pork is commonly found in Balinese dishes such as Babi Guling. Balinese percussion orchestra music, known as gamelan, is highly developed and varied. Balinese performing arts often portray stories from Hindu epics such as the Ramayana but with heavy Balinese influence. Famous Balinese dances include pendet, legong, baris, topeng, barong, gong kebyar, and kecak (the monkey dance). Bali boasts one of the most diverse and innovative performing arts cultures in the world, with paid performances at thousands of temple festivals, private ceremonies, and public shows.

In 2018 Governor I Wayan Koster issued Bali Governor's Regulation No. 79 of 2018 which mandated that city officials wear traditional Balinese dress, such as that made of songket. This was followed by Circular No. 4 of 2021 which specified the use of Endek fabrics, and was expanded to high-ranking individuals in the private sector and other institutions.

=== Architecture ===
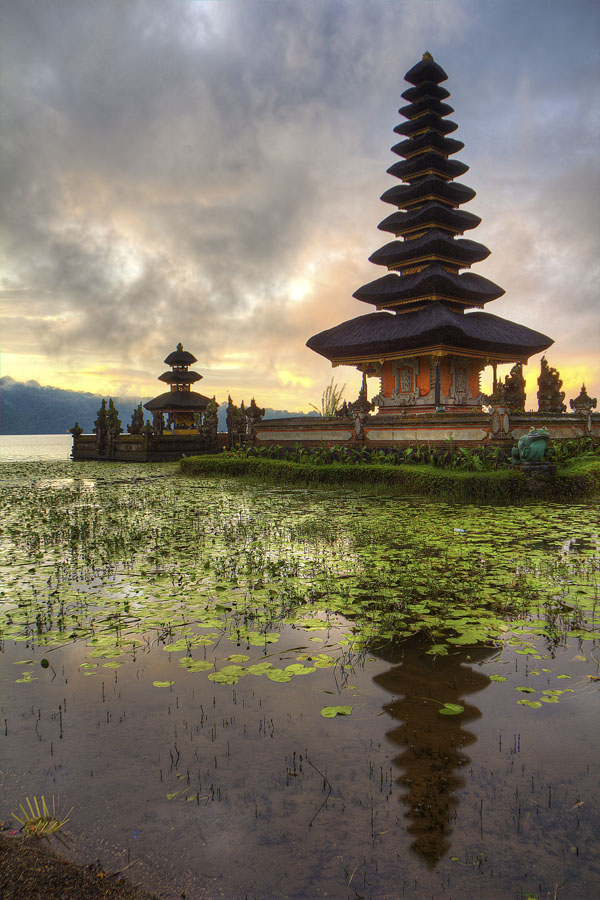
The pagoda-like Pelinggih Meru shrine of Pura Ulun Danu Bratan is a distinctive feature of a Balinese temple.

Kaja and kelod are the Balinese equivalents of North and South, which refer to one's orientation between the island's largest mountain Gunung Agung (kaja), and the sea (kelod). In addition to spatial orientation, kaja and kelod have the connotation of good and evil; gods and ancestors are believed to live on the mountain whereas demons live in the sea. Buildings such as temples and residential homes are spatially oriented by having the most sacred spaces closest to the mountain and the unclean places nearest to the sea.

Most temples have an inner courtyard and an outer courtyard which are arranged with the inner courtyard furthest kaja. These spaces serve as performance venues since most Balinese rituals are accompanied by any combination of music, dance, and drama. The performances that take place in the inner courtyard are classified as wali, the most sacred rituals which are offerings exclusively for the gods, while the outer courtyard is where bebali ceremonies are held, which are intended for gods and people. Lastly, performances meant solely for the entertainment of humans take place outside the temple's walls and are called bali-balihan. This three-tiered system of classification was standardised in 1971 by a committee of Balinese officials and artists to better protect the sanctity of the oldest and most sacred Balinese rituals from being performed for a paying audience.

=== Dances ===
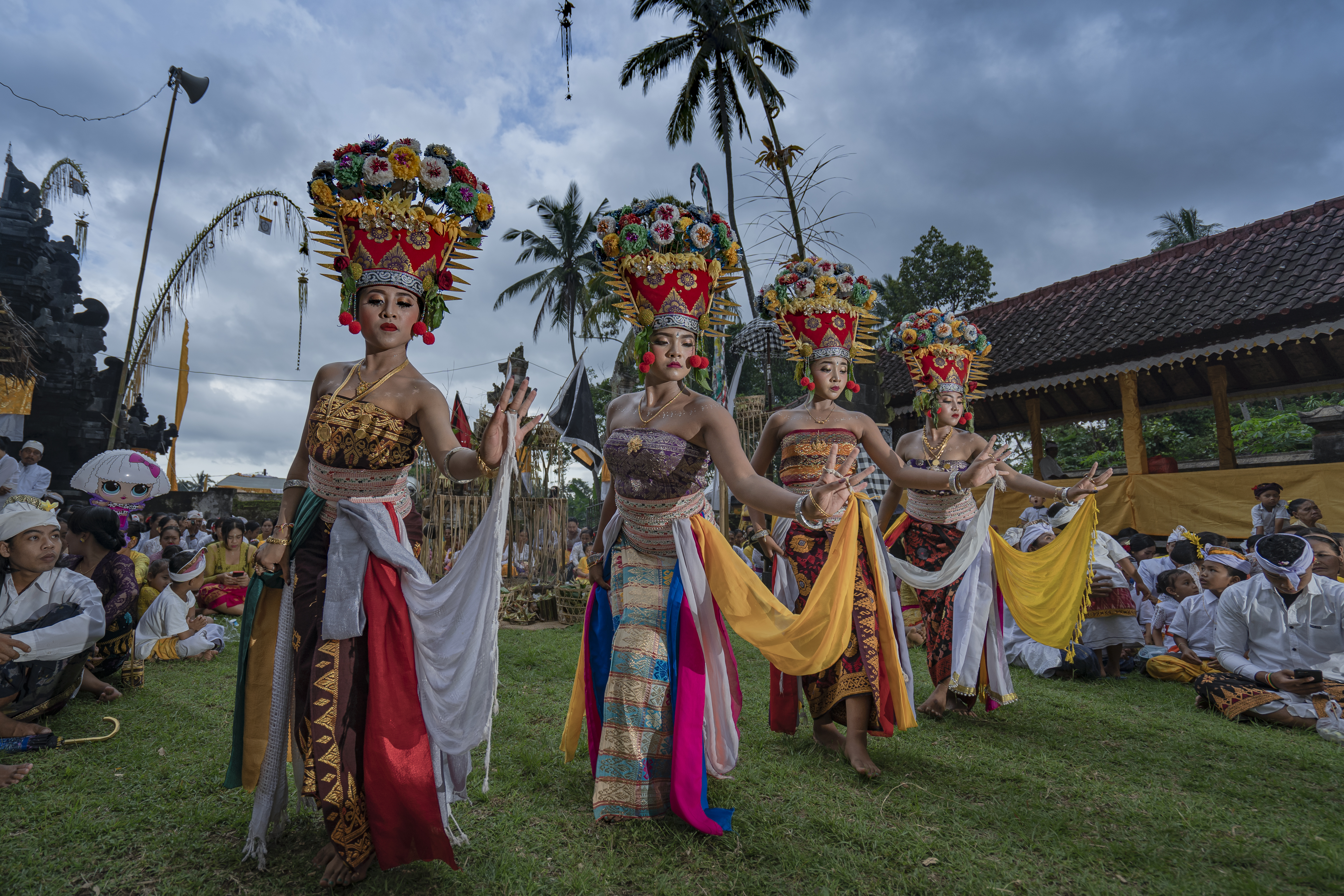
Rejang, a sacred Balinese dance to greet the gods that come down to the earth on the ceremony day

Tourism, Bali's chief industry, has provided the island with a foreign audience that is eager to pay for entertainment, thus creating new performance opportunities and more demand for performers. The impact of tourism is controversial since before it became integrated into the economy, the Balinese performing arts did not exist as a capitalist venture, and were not performed for entertainment outside of their respective ritual context. Since the 1930s sacred rituals such as the barong dance have been performed both in their original contexts, as well as exclusively for paying tourists. This has led to new versions of many of these performances that have developed according to the preferences of foreign audiences; some villages have a barong mask specifically for non-ritual performances and an older mask that is only used for sacred performances.

=== Festivals ===
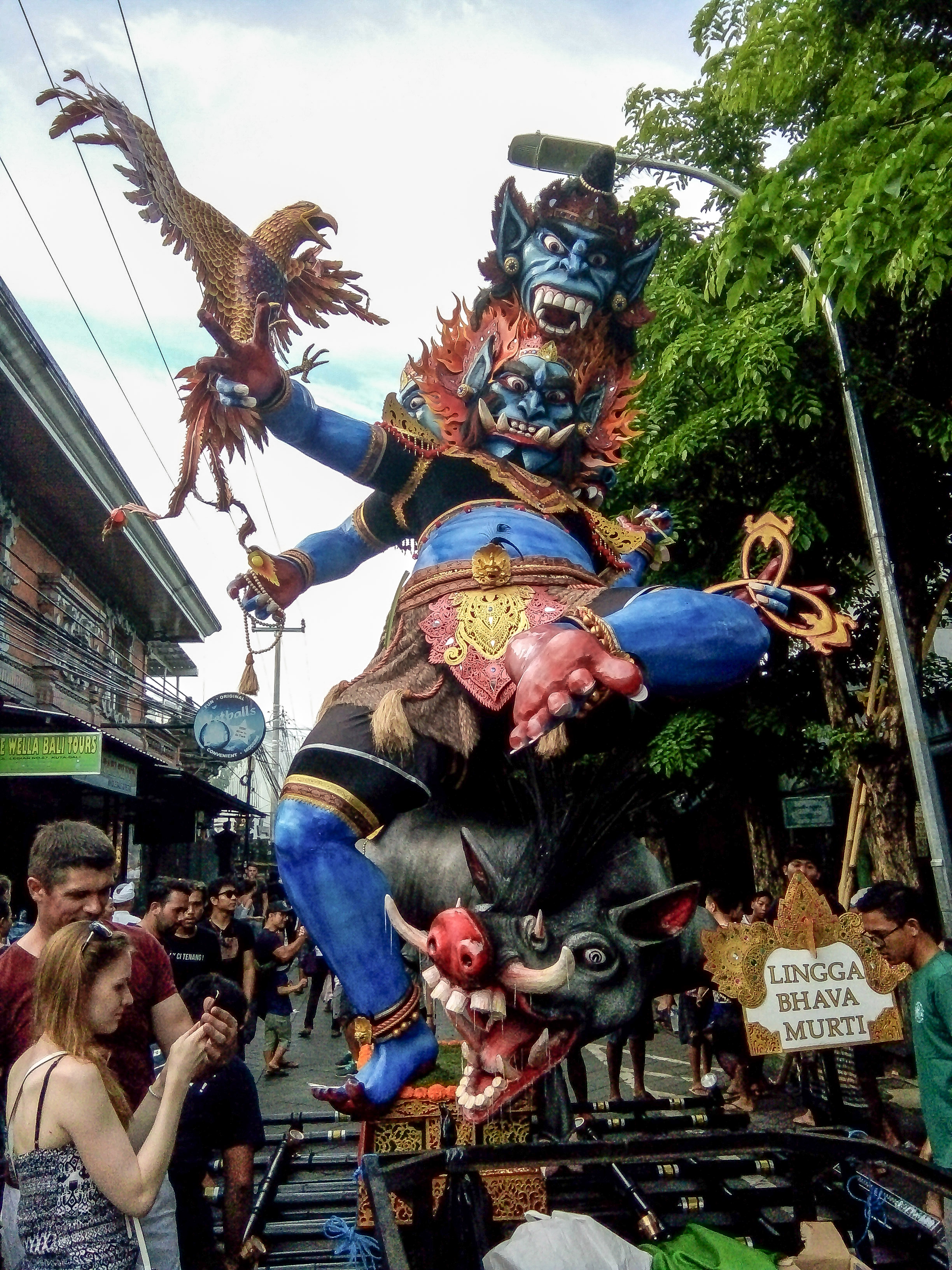
Ogoh-ogoh Festival in Kuta in 2018

Throughout the year, there are many festivals celebrated locally or island-wide according to the traditional calendars. The Hindu New Year, Nyepi, is celebrated in the spring by a day of silence. On this day everyone stays at home and tourists are encouraged (or required) to remain in their hotels. On the day before New Year, large and colourful sculptures of Ogoh-ogoh monsters are paraded and burned in the evening to drive away evil spirits. Other festivals throughout the year are specified by the Balinese pawukon calendrical system.

Celebrations are held for many occasions such as a tooth-filing (coming-of-age ritual), cremation or odalan (temple festival). One of the most important concepts that Balinese ceremonies have in common is that of désa kala patra, which refers to how ritual performances must be appropriate in both the specific and general social context. Many ceremonial art forms such as wayang kulit and topeng are highly improvisatory, providing flexibility for the performer to adapt the performance to the current situation. Many celebrations call for a loud, boisterous atmosphere with much activity, and the resulting aesthetic, ramé, is distinctively Balinese. Often two or more gamelan ensembles will be performing well within earshot, and sometimes compete with each other to be heard. Likewise, the audience members talk amongst themselves, get up and walk around, or even cheer on the performance, which adds to the many layers of activity and the liveliness typical of ramé.

=== Tradition ===
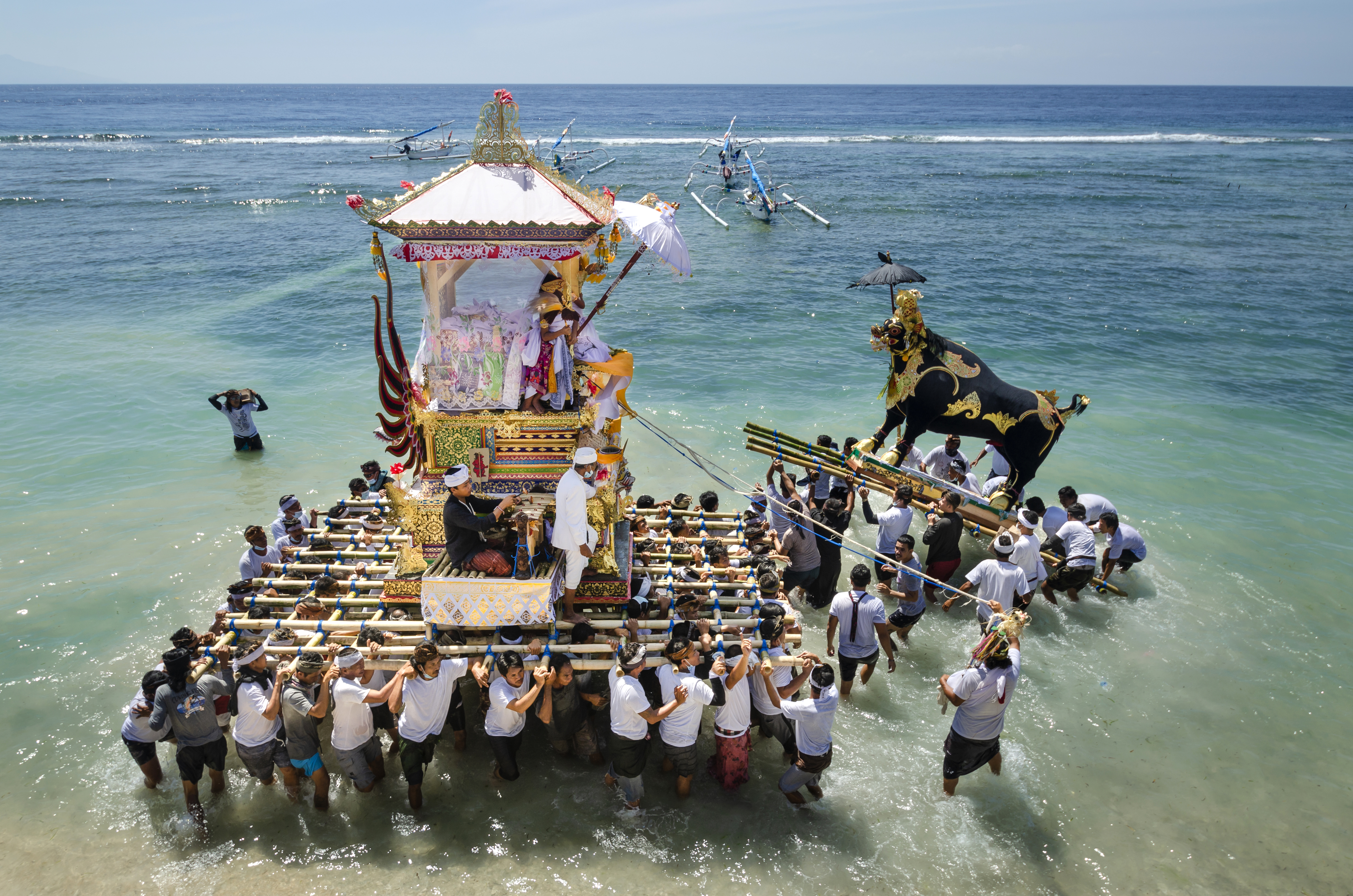
Cremation ceremony in Nusa Penida

Balinese society continues to revolve around each family's ancestral village, to which the cycle of life and religion is closely tied. Coercive aspects of traditional society, such as customary law sanctions imposed by traditional authorities such as village councils (including "kasepekang", or shunning) have risen in importance as a consequence of the democratisation and decentralisation of Indonesia since 1998.

Other than Balinese sacred rituals and festivals, the government presents Bali Arts Festival to showcase Bali's performing arts and various artworks produced by the local talents that they have. It is held once a year, from the second week of June until the end of July. Southeast Asia's biggest annual festival of words and ideas Ubud Writers and Readers Festival is held at Ubud in October, which is participated by the world's most celebrated writers, artists, thinkers, and performers.

One unusual tradition is the naming of children in Bali. In general, Balinese people name their children depending on the order they are born, and the names are the same for both males and females.

=== Beauty pageant ===
Bali was the host of Miss World 2013 (63rd edition of the Miss World pageant). It was the first time Indonesia hosted an international beauty pageant. In 2022, Bali also co-hosted Miss Grand International 2022 along with Jakarta, West Java, and Banten.

== International conferences and summits ==
Bali has hosted several milestone regional and sectoral gatherings, including foundational ASEAN summits. Key agreements signed on the island include the 1976 Declaration of ASEAN Concord and the Treaty of Amity and Cooperation in Southeast Asia, as well as the Bali Concord II (2003) and Bali Concord III (2011). It also serves as the venue for the East Asia Summit's "Bali Principles" for mutually beneficial relations.

The province has been a focal point for global environmental and trade governance. It hosted the 2007 UNFCCC COP13, which produced the Bali Road Map, and the 2013 APEC Leaders' Week. Additionally, the WTO Ninth Ministerial Conference adopted the "Bali Package" on trade facilitation in 2013.

Bali also anchors regional governance architectures through recurring platforms like the Bali Process on people smuggling and the Bali Democracy Forum. In 2022, the UN’s Global Platform for Disaster Risk Reduction was held on the island.

More recently, Bali has hosted the Multilateral Naval Exercise Komodo (MNEK). The 2025 iteration involved 38 countries and 19 foreign warships at Tanjung Benoa. These drills occurred amid regional tensions in the South China Sea regarding maritime claims, including China's "nine-dash line" which a 2016 arbitral tribunal under UNCLOS found had no legal basis.

== Sports ==
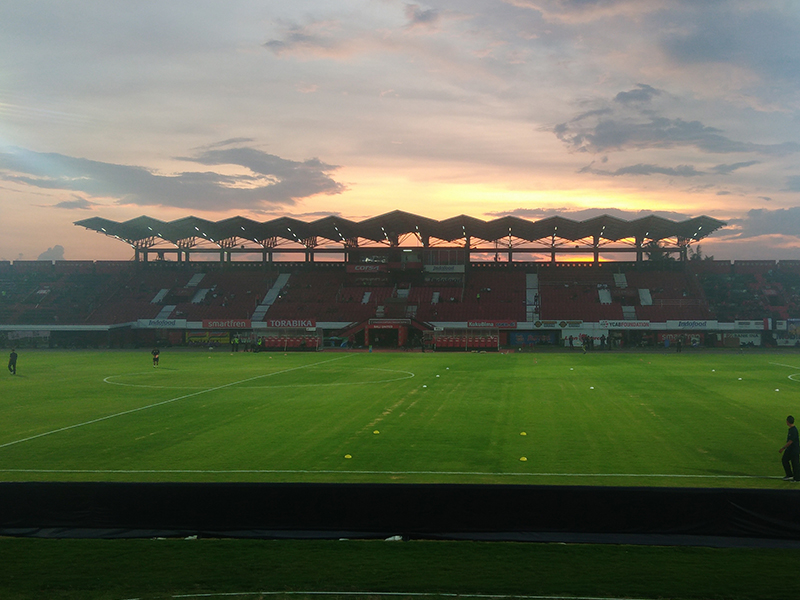
Kapten I Wayan Dipta Stadium, the home of Bali United F.C.

Bali is a major world surfing destination with popular breaks dotted across the southern coastline and around the offshore island of Nusa Lembongan.

As part of the Coral Triangle, Bali, including Nusa Penida, offers a wide range of dive sites with varying types of reefs, and tropical aquatic life.

Bali was the host of 2008 Asian Beach Games. It was the second time Indonesia hosted an Asia-level multi-sport event, after Jakarta held the 1962 Asian Games.

In 2023, Bali was the location for a major eSports event, the Dota 2 Bali Major, the third and final Major of the Dota Pro Circuit season. The event was held at the Ayana Estate and the Champa Garden, and it was the first time that a Dota Pro Circuit Major was held in Indonesia.

In football, Bali is home to Bali United football club, which plays in Liga 1. The team was relocated from Samarinda, East Kalimantan to Gianyar, Bali. Harbiansyah Hanafiah, the main commissioner of Bali United explained that he changed the name and moved the home base because there was no representative from Bali in the highest football tier in Indonesia. Another reason was due to local fans in Samarinda preferring to support Pusamania Borneo F.C. rather than Persisam.

== Heritage sites ==
In June 2012, Subak, the irrigation system for paddy fields in Jatiluwih, central Bali was listed as a Natural UNESCO World Heritage Site.

== In popular culture ==
- Road to Bali, a 1952 Hollywood comedy film starring Bing Crosby and Bob Hope
- Eat Pray Love, a 2010 Hollywood drama film starring Julia Roberts
- Ticket to Paradise, a 2022 Hollywood romantic comedy film starring George Clooney and Julia Roberts

== See also ==
- Culture of Indonesia
- Hinduism in Indonesia
- Tourism in Indonesia

== Bibliography ==
- Andy Barski, Albert Beaucort; Bruce Carpenter, Barski (2007). Bali and Lombok. Dorling Kindersley, London. ISBN 978-0-7566-2878-9.
- Haer, Debbie Guthrie; Morillot, Juliette & Toh, Irene (2001). Bali, a traveller's companion. Editions Didier Millet. ISBN 978-981-4217-35-4.
- Gold, Lisa (2005). Music in Bali: Experiencing Music, Expressing Culture. New York: Oxford University Press. ISBN 0-19-514149-0.
- Taylor, Jean Gelman (2003). Indonesia: Peoples and Histories. New Haven and London: Yale University Press. ISBN 0-300-10518-5.
- Pringle, Robert (2004). Bali: Indonesia's Hindu Realm; A short history of. Short History of Asia Series. Allen & Unwin. ISBN 1-86508-863-3.
