= Balinese Hinduism =

Form of Hinduism practiced in Bali, Indonesia

- Balinese Hindu "Om" symbol

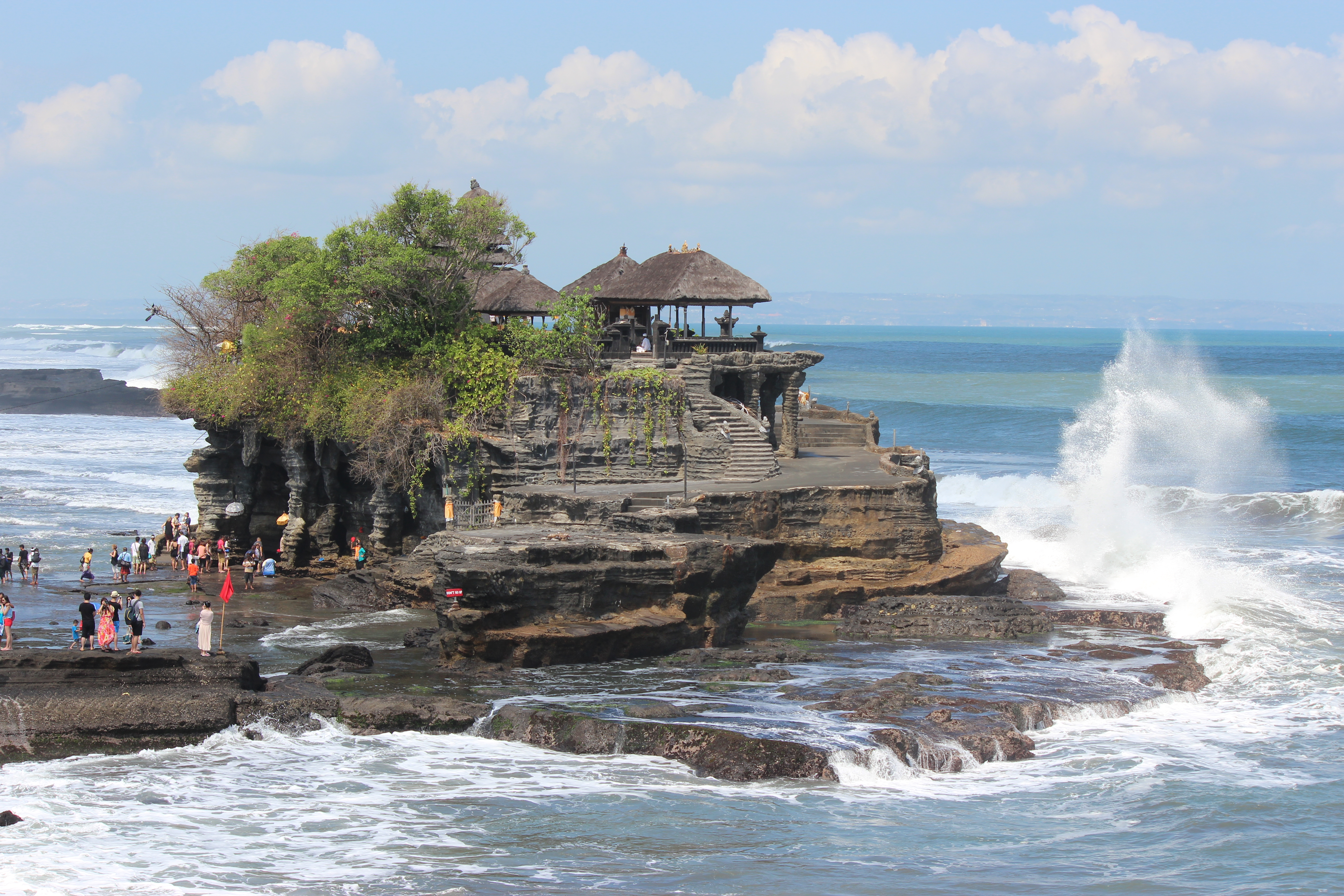
- Tanah Lot temple

Total population
- ~ 4,300,000

Religions
- Hinduism

Scriptures
- Various ancient Balinese literature such as Lontar, some of which are sourced from Vedas

Languages
- Balinese (mother tongue), Sanskrit (liturgical), Kawi (ceremonial), Indonesian

Related ethnic groups
- Javanese Hindus and other Indonesian Hindus

Balinese Hinduism (Balinese: ᬳᬶᬦ᭄ᬤᬸᬩᬮᬶ; Indonesian: Hindu Bali or Agama Hindu Dharma) is a distinct form of Hinduism practised primarily on the island of Bali, Indonesia. It developed through a long process of religious syncretism, combining indigenous Balinese beliefs with Hindu traditions that spread through the Indonesian archipelago from the early centuries CE. Rather than representing a direct continuation of Indian Hinduism, Balinese Hinduism constitutes a locally evolved religious system shaped by ritual practice, communal organisation, and sacred geography.

Balinese Hinduism is the majority religion in the province of Bali, where approximately 86–87% of the population identify as Hindu, amounting to around 3.8 million adherents on the island. Hinduism as practised in Bali accounts for the largest concentration of Hindus in Indonesia, a country where Hindus constitute about 1.7% of the total population.

Balinese Hinduism emphasises ritual practice (orthopraxy) over doctrinal authority, communal religious obligation, ancestor veneration, and the maintenance of balance between the visible (sekala) and invisible (niskala) worlds. While it incorporates Hindu philosophical concepts such as dharma, karma, punarjanman, and moksha, these are interpreted through Balinese cosmology and social structures. The religion also reflects historical syncretism with Buddhist and indigenous animist and ancestral worship traditions.

In the modern period, Balinese Hinduism has been institutionally defined to meet Indonesian state requirements for religious recognition, including the articulation of a supreme divine principle, Sang Hyang Widhi Wasa. As such, Balinese Hinduism has been formally recognized by the Indonesian Government as one of the official religions practised in the country. Despite these formal adaptations, Balinese Hinduism remains deeply rooted in temple-based worship, ritual cycles, and village institutions, and continues to play a central role in Balinese cultural and social life.

== Origins and history ==
=== Prehistory ===
Prior to the introduction of Indian Hindu–Buddhist influences, religion in Bali was shaped by indigenous Austronesian traditions centred on ancestor veneration, animism, and sacred landscapes. These beliefs were not displaced by Hinduism but were incorporated into it, remaining most evident in the Hindu practices of the Bali Aga communities today. This continuity is exemplified at the temple Pura Pucak Penulisan where squatting ancestral statues have been dated to 2,000 years old and have remained sacred across both pre-Hindu and Hindu periods.

=== Indian and early Southeast Asian influence ===
Hindu and Buddhist concepts entered the Indonesian archipelago as early as the first century CE through long-distance trade and cultural exchange. Archeological evidence of Indian trade with Bali has been found at Sembiran village dating to this period. Stories from the Mahabharata have been traced in the Indonesian islands from the first century CE with these versions mirroring those found in Tamil Nadu. These influences arrived into Bali primarily via Java rather than directly from India and were mediated through local courts and religious specialists. Sanskrit terminology, Indian epics, cosmology, and ritual ideas were selectively adopted and adapted to existing Balinese frameworks.

According to Balinese legend and recorded on lontar manuscripts, Hinduism was founded on the island by the East Indian priest Rsi Markandeya in the 8th century CE during the period of the Mataram Kingdom on Java. Markandeya led an early expedition to Bali with his followers, which was unsuccessful due to a widespread disease outbreak, most likely cholera. Following this setback, he returned to Java. Through spiritual reflection and the application of knowledge associated with Atharva Vedic traditions and Rasa Shastra, Markandeya developed a ritual method of water purification. He subsequently returned to Bali, where he is said to have sanctified the island’s water sources by burying the Panca Dhatu (five sacred metals) at designated locations on Mount Agung and founded temples across the island including the mother temple, Besakih.

=== Majapahit period and consolidation ===
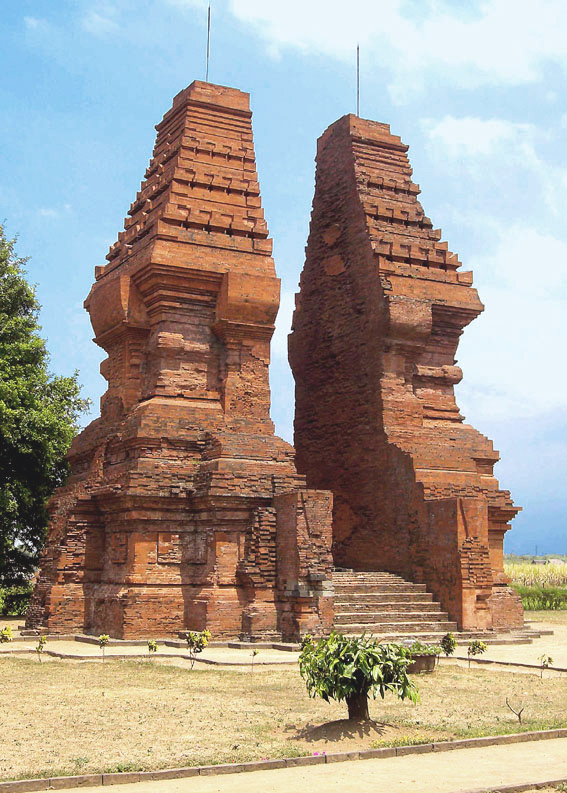
Wringin Lawang split gate at Trowulan, Java. The Majapahit style heavily influenced Balinese temple design and architecture.

The most significant formative period for Balinese Hinduism occurred during and after the decline of the Javanese Majapahit empire in the late 14th and 15th centuries. In 1343 the Majaphit led by Prime Minister Gajah Mada conquered Bali defeating the local ruler at Bedulu. This pivotal invasion transformed Bali into a vassal state, resulting in a significant influx of Javanese Hindu culture, aristocracy, and artistry, which deeply influenced Balinese society, language, and religion for centuries.

As Islamic polities rose in Java during the late 15th century, Hindu-Javanese elites, priests, artists, and intellectuals migrated to Bali. They brought court culture, Old Javanese (Kawi) literature, temple architecture, and Brahmanical ritual traditions. As was the case in Java, Budhism in Bali was largely integrated into a dominant Hindu religion.

The most significant figure during this period was the priest Dang Hyang Nirartha who is credited with being the most influential reformer of Balinese Hinduism. He was sent to Bali by the Majapahit court in 1492 and founded the Sahivite priesthood that is now ubiquitous.

Niratha was an important promoter of the idea of moksha (freedom from the cycle of death and rebirth) and introduced into Balinese temples the padmasana shrine of the empty throne as an altar to the supreme god Acintya or Shiva. The temples on the coasts of Bali were augmented with the padmasana shrines by the dozen during Nirartha's travels.

=== Colonial period ===
During the Dutch colonial rule in the 19th and early 20th centuries, Balinese religion was increasingly categorised and studied through European frameworks. Colonial administrators and scholars often described Balinese Hinduism as a "preserved" or "classical" form of Hinduism, a characterisation that obscured its dynamic and adaptive nature. Colonial intervention disrupted royal authority and temple patronage but did not dismantle village-based religious institutions, which remained central to religious continuity.

=== Modern redefinition and Indonesian state recognition ===
Following the Indonesian independence, Balinese religious leaders undertook a process of formal reinterpretation to secure official recognition of their religion within the Indonesian state, which requires belief in a supreme deity. This led to the articulation of Ida Sang Hyang Widhi Wasa as the supreme divine principle and the formal naming of the religion as Agama Hindu Dharma.

In 1952, the Indonesian Ministry of Religion came under the control of Islamists who severely constrained the acceptable definition of a "religion". To be acceptable as an officially government recognised religion, the ministry defined "religion" as one that is monotheistic, has codified religious law, possesses a prophet and a Holy Book, amongst other requirements. Balinese Hindus were declared as "people without a religion", and available to be converted. The Balinese disagreed, debated, adapted, and declared their form of Hinduism to be monotheistic, and presented it in a form to be eligible for the status of agama under the 1952 amended articles.

To accomplish this, the Balinese initiated a series of student and cultural exchange initiatives between Bali and India to help formulate the core principles behind Balinese Hinduism (Vedas, Upanishad, Puranas, Itihasa). This led to the joint petition of 1958 which demanded the Indonesian government recognize Hindu Dharma. This joint petition quoted the following Sanskrit mantra from the Hindu scriptures:

Om tat sat ekam eva advitiyam

Translation: Om, thus is the essence of the all-pervading, infinite, undivided one.

— Joint petition by Hindus of Bali, 14 June 1958

The petition's focus on the "undivided one" was to satisfy the constitutional requirement that Indonesian citizens have a monotheistic belief in one God with Ida Sanghyang Widhi Wasa being identified as the undivided one. In the Balinese language, this term has two meanings: "the Divine ruler of the Universe" and "the Divine Absolute Cosmic Law". This creative phrase met the monotheistic requirement of the Indonesian Ministry of Religion in the former sense, while the latter sense of its meaning preserved the central ideas of dharma in ancient scripts of Hinduism. Bali became the only part of Indonesia to remain predominantly Hindu.

== Key beliefs ==
The foundation of Balinese Hinduism rests on three principles: Tattwa (Philosophy), Susila (Ethics), and Acara (Ritual Practice). These principles are inseparable, forming a unified whole.

Balinese Hindu philosophy emphasizes the pursuit of ultimate truth, attainable through three means of knowledge (Tri Pramana): Pratyaksa Pramana (direct observation), Anumana Pramana (inference), and Agama Pramana (study of scripture and guidance from trusted teachers). From these arise faith (Sradha), expressed in five essences known as Panca Sradha:

- Belief in God (Sang Hyang Widhi Wasa),
- Belief in Atman,
- Belief in Karma Phala,
- Belief in Punarbhawa (reincarnation), and
- Belief in Moksha.

=== Supreme reality and divinity ===
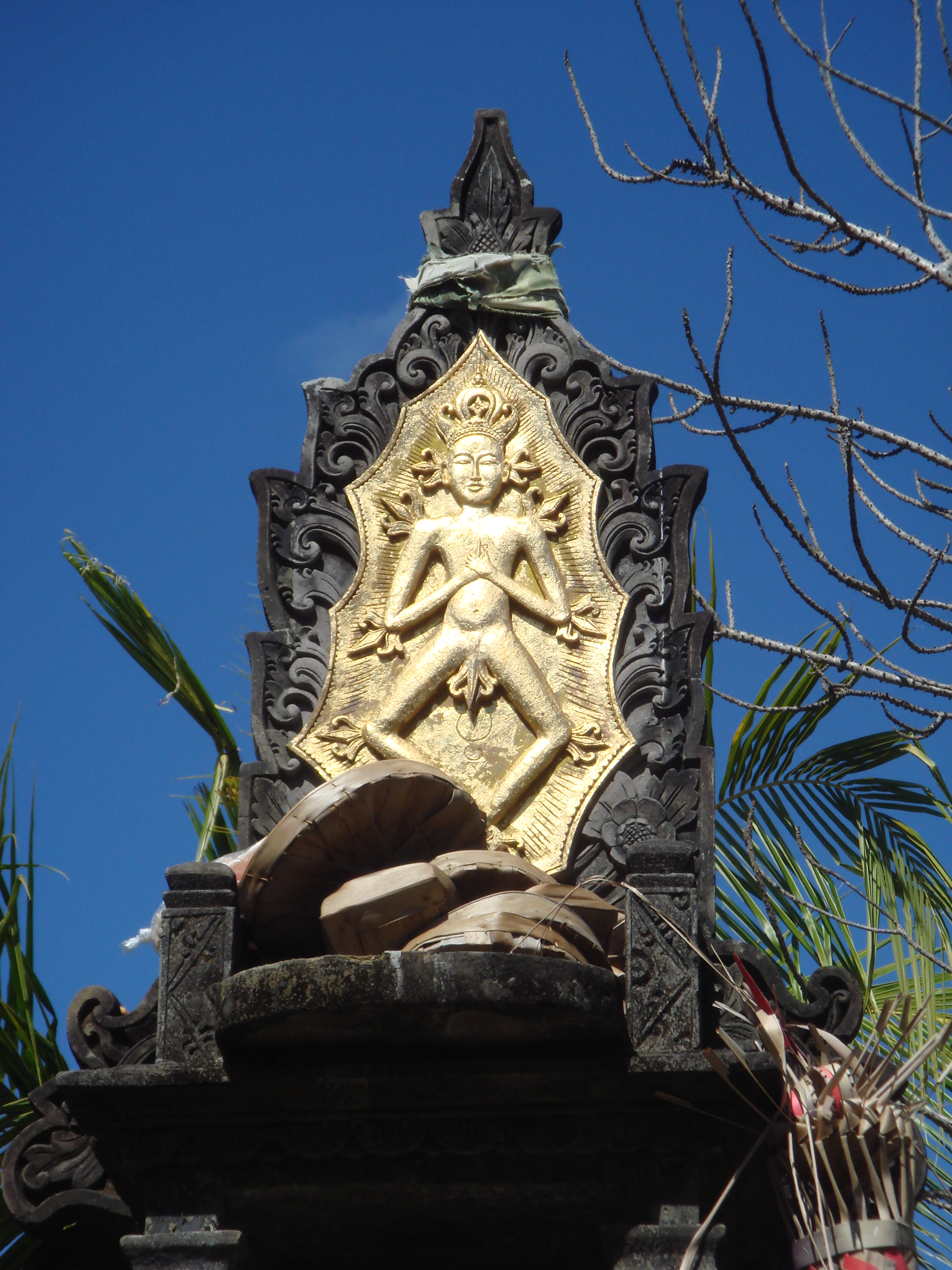
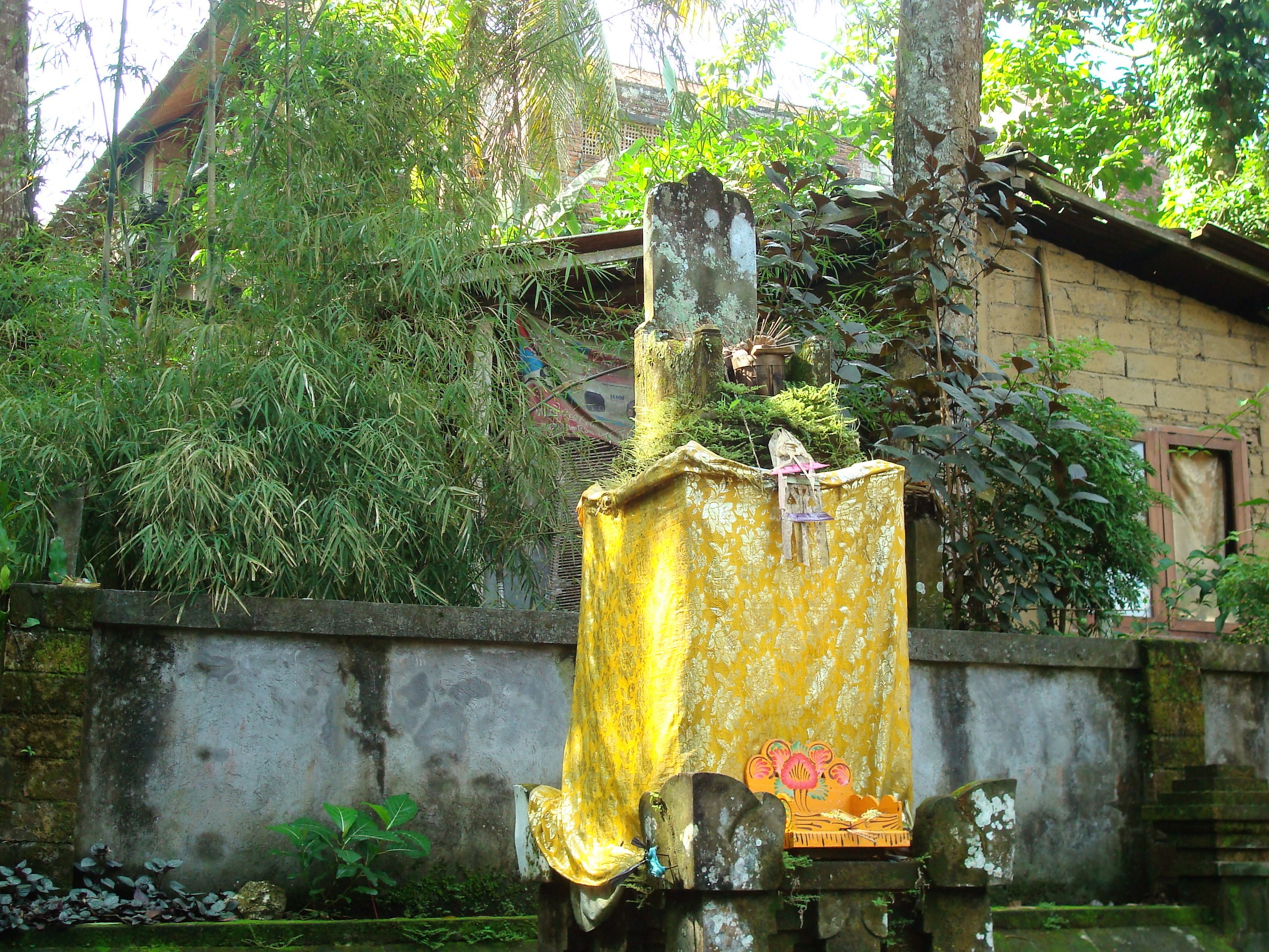
Sang Hyang Widhi Wasa (left), the Divine Oneness and supreme god of Balinese Hinduism. Acintya is a part of temples, home shrines and ceremonies, remembered with a colourfully decorated stone seat, Padmasana (right).

Balinese Hinduism recognises a supreme, formless reality known as Sang Hyang Widhi Wasa, understood as the ultimate source of existence. This supreme principle is manifested through multiple gods (dewa), each representing specific aspects of cosmic function and natural order. Sang Hyang Widhi has been likened to the concept of the Christian God or Allah in Islam.

The major Hindu deities—such as Brahma, Vishnu, and Shiva—are revered, with Shiva often occupying a particularly prominent role. Divinity is not viewed as distant or abstract but as actively present in the natural world, temples, ancestors, and daily life.

=== Catur Purusa Artha ===
Catur Purusa Artha refers to the four fundamental aims of human life recognised in Balinese Hinduism, adapted from broader Hindu philosophical traditions (puruṣārtha). These aims provide an ethical and spiritual framework guiding individual conduct and social responsibility, and are understood as interdependent rather than sequential.

- Dharma – Moral duty and right conduct, encompassing religious obligation, social responsibility, and ethical behaviour. In Balinese Hinduism, dharma is closely linked to communal participation, ritual observance, and the maintenance of harmony.
- Artha – Material prosperity and economic well-being, pursued through lawful and socially responsible means. Artha is valued as necessary for sustaining family life, fulfilling ritual obligations, and supporting communal institutions.
- Kama – Pleasure, emotional fulfilment, and aesthetic enjoyment, recognised as a legitimate aspect of human life when balanced with dharma. Artistic expression, ritual performance, and family life are key expressions of kama in Balinese culture.
- Moksa – Spiritual liberation from the cycle of rebirth (samsara), achieved through ethical living, ritual purification, and spiritual insight across multiple lifetimes.

=== Karma, rebirth, and liberation ===
Balinese Hinduism shares core Hindu concepts of karma, samsara (the cycle of birth, death, and rebirth), and moksha (liberation). Actions in this life influence one’s future rebirths, shaping both individual destiny and family lineage. Liberation is understood not only as spiritual release but also as the purification of the soul through ethical conduct, ritual observance, and devotion across multiple lifetimes.

=== Tri Hita Karana ===
A central philosophical concept in Balinese Hinduism is Tri Hita Karana, meaning "the three causes of well-being". It emphasises harmony in three interrelated relationships:

- Parahyangan - Harmony between humans and the divine
- Pawongan - Harmony among humans within society
- Palemahan - Harmony between humans and the natural environment

This principle underpins religious practice, social organisation, architecture, agriculture, and environmental stewardship in Balinese life.

=== Ethics and social duty ===
Balinese Hindu Ethics or susila emphasize harmonious relationships with others and the universe, grounded in sincerity, sacrifice (yadnya), and compassion. The word susila comes from "Su" (good, harmonious) and "Sila" (conduct).The principal Tat Twam Asi ("He is you") teaches that harming others is harming oneself, while helping others is helping oneself. Ethics are reinforced by Tri Kaya Parisudha—thinking good (manacika), speaking good (wacika), and doing good (kayika).

Ethics are strongly grounded in the concept of dharma, understood as the proper fulfilment of religious, social, and communal obligations rather than adherence to a codified moral law. Ethical conduct is expressed primarily through participation in ritual life, maintenance of social harmony, and fulfilment of responsibilities within family, village, and religious institutions. Moral behaviour is therefore relational and situational, embedded in collective practice rather than individual belief alone.

In Balinese society, individuals are expected to contribute labour, resources, and time to their banjar (neighbourhood association), desa adat (customary village), and temple networks. Participation in rituals, festivals, and collective work (gotong royong) is both a religious and ethical obligation. Failure to fulfil communal duties is viewed less as a personal moral failing than as a disruption of social and cosmic balance. Sanctions for ethical lapses are typically social—such as loss of standing or ritual exclusion—rather than punitive in a legal sense.

Ethical behaviour in Balinese Hinduism includes proper recognition of social roles, seniority, and ritual status. Respect for elders, religious specialists, and community leaders is considered a moral duty, reflected in language use, bodily comportment, and ritual etiquette.

Correct ritual performance (tata susila and tata upacara) is central to ethical life. Ritual errors are not necessarily viewed as sins but as technical or procedural failures that may require correction through additional offerings or ceremonies. Intention (niat) and sincerity are valued, but ethical emphasis remains on correct participation rather than internal belief alone. This reflects a broader orientation toward orthopraxy (right practice) rather than orthodoxy (right belief).

Ethical responsibility in Balinese Hinduism extends to the natural environment, consistent with the principle of Tri Hita Karana. Humans are expected to maintain respectful and sustainable relationships with land, water, and animals, which are regarded as spiritually animated. Agricultural practices, temple calendars, and water management systems such as subak reflect ethical commitments to cooperation, fairness, and ecological balance.

Balinese Hindu ethics incorporate the principle of karma, whereby actions generate consequences that may unfold across multiple lifetimes. However, karma is not interpreted strictly as individual moral reward or punishment. It is also understood as collective and ancestral, linking families and communities across generations. Ethical conduct therefore includes maintaining ancestral obligations, performing rites correctly, and preserving family and temple continuity, as these actions are believed to influence both present harmony and future rebirth.

=== Deities ===
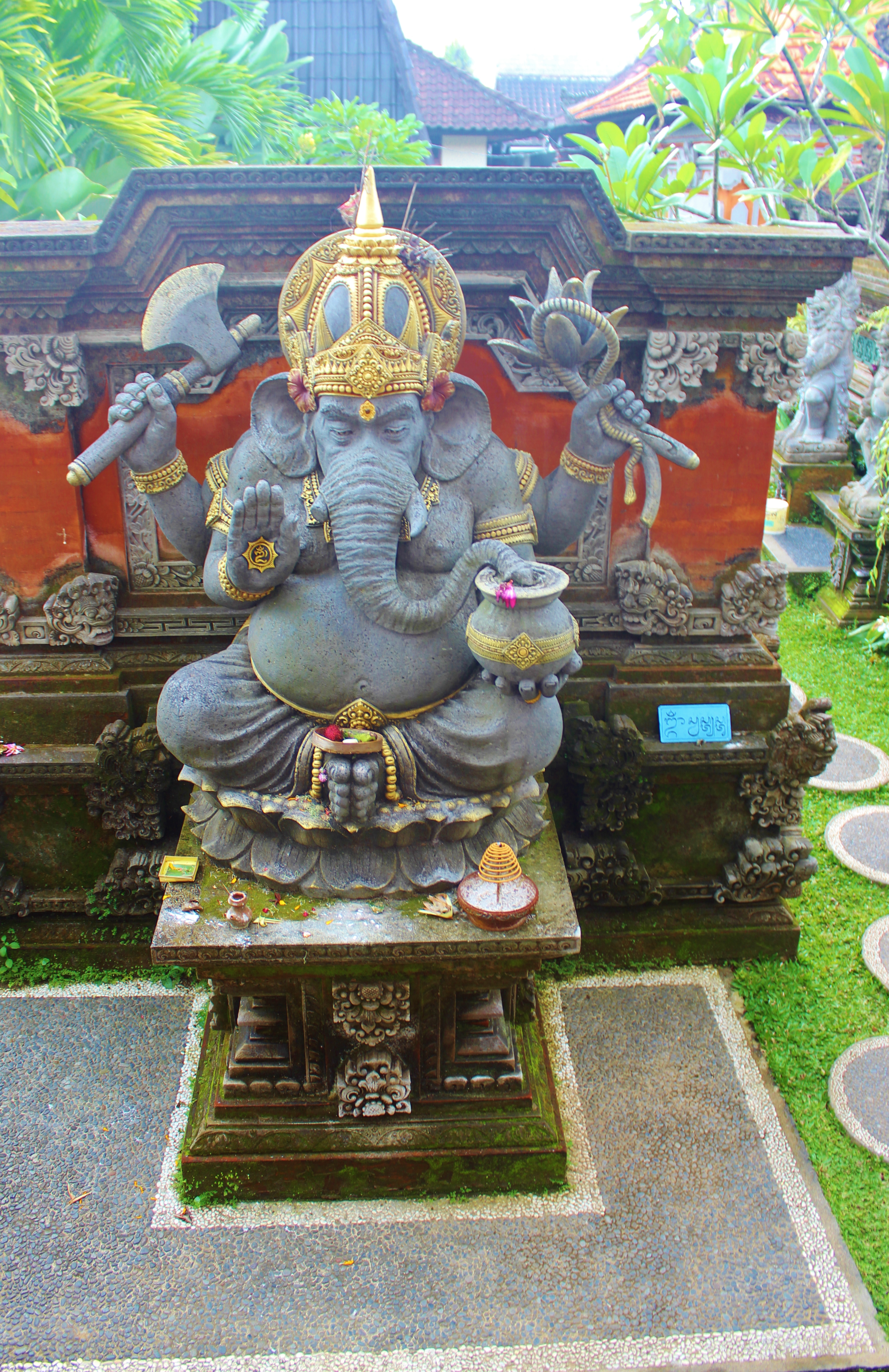
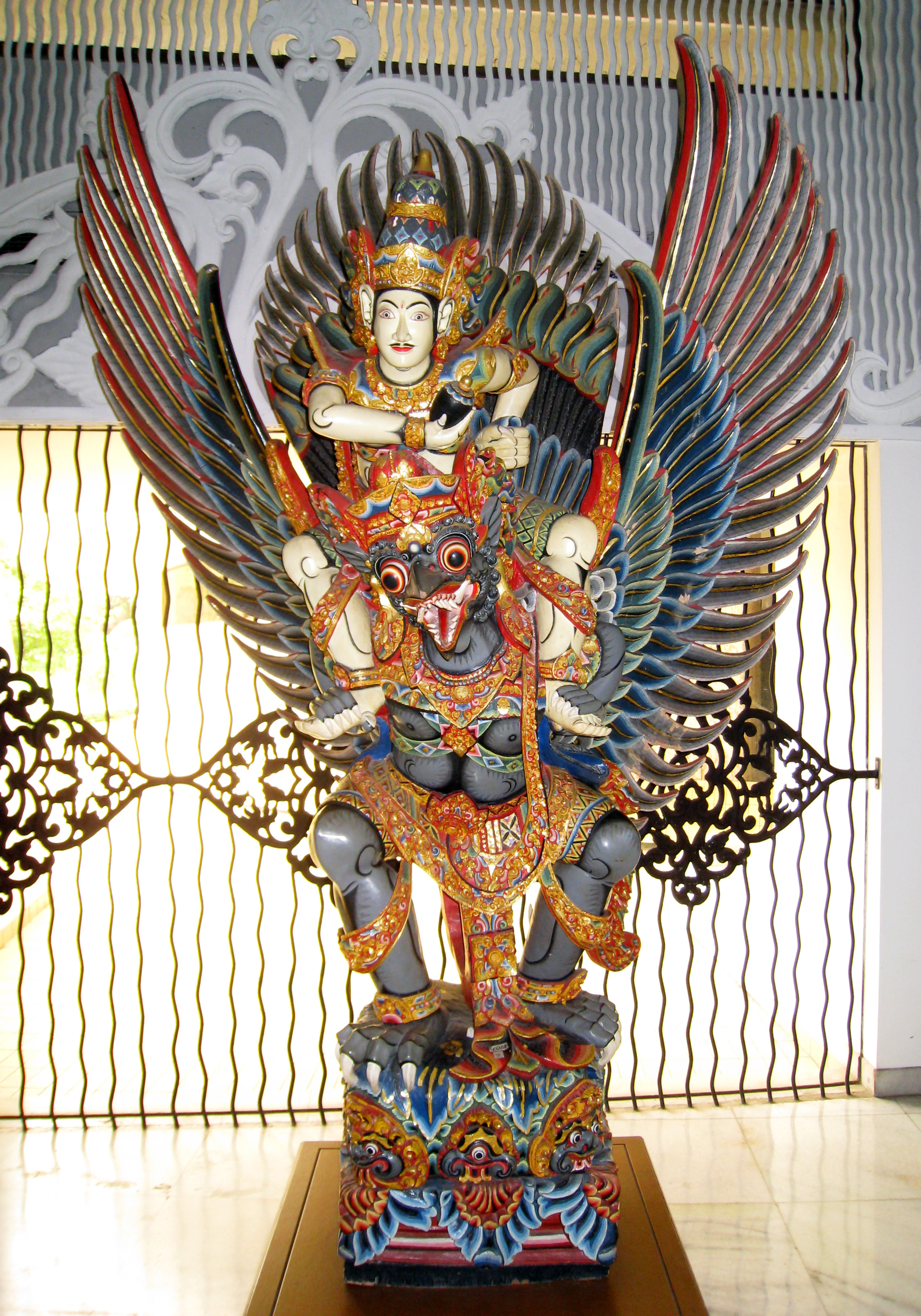
Some of many Hindu gods and goddesses of Balinese Hinduism:
Ganesha (left), Vishnu on Garuda (right).

Through the ages, the Balinese have adopted the Indian Hindu pantheon of gods (dewa) and goddesses (dewi), though having adapted it to their own history, character and unique needs.

I Nyoman Tantrayana argues that, while the concept of a supreme god remained largely unmanifest in Indian Hinduism, in Bali it became personified as the enigmatic Sanghyang Widhi Wasa, and that the pantheon of gods are manifestations of the supreme consciousness. He contends that this system of worship is not truly pantheistic, but rather represents a flexible form of monotheism.

According to Tantrayana, these gods and the associated Balinese mythology assists in personalising the relationship to the divine. "Each individual is likely to find a Dewa or Dewi that they most naturally and closely connect with... through over time that affinity may change." "As personifications, the Dewa-Dewi are ascribed human qualities, some less than admorable."

The major Indian Hindu gods of the Trimurti —Brahma, Wisnu (Vishnu), and Çiwa (Shiva)—hold particular significance to the Balinese, with Shiva often occupying a central position in Balinese theology as a god of transformation and spiritual power. In Balinese Hindu texts, the alternate tripartite concept of Shiva of Indian Shaivism is also found. This is usually referred in Balinese as "Siwa-Sadasiwa-Paramasiwa", where Shiva is the creator, the maintainer and the destroyer of cyclic existence.

Along with the trimurti, Balinese Hindus worship a range of gods and goddesses (variously referred to as Hyang, Dewata and Batara-Batari), as well as others that are unique and not found in Indian Hinduism. Some of the more revered and recognisables gods and goddesses include:

- Dewi Sri – Goddess of rice, fertility, and life-giving abundance; central to subak irrigation rituals and household worship. An indigenous goddess likely pre-dating Hinduism but now aligned with the Indian goddess Lakshmi.
- Ganesha (Ganapati) – God of wisdom, thresholds, and the removal of obstacles; commonly found at temples, crossroads, and places of transition.
- Bhatara Kala – God of time, destruction, and dangerous liminal forces; prominent in calendrical rites, exorcisms, and rites of passage.
- Dewi Durga – Goddess associated with death, transformation, and protective destructive power; especially important in temple and cremation contexts. The pura dalem or death temple is dedicated to her.
- Dewi Saraswati – Goddess of knowledge, writing, and learning; ritually central during Saraswati Day in the Balinese calendar.

Among deities associated with the natural world, those linked to mountains and lakes are considered the most powerful. The god of Mount Agung, Ida Bhatara Gunung Agung, is honoured at Besakih Temple and in meru shrines throughout the island. Dewi Ulun Danu Batur, the goddess of Lake Batur, is associated with water, fertility, and agricultural prosperity.

The sea occupies a contrasting position in Balinese cosmology. It is regarded simultaneously as a source of danger and a powerful agent of purification. Rather than personifying a single sea deity, the Balinese commonly refer to Segara, meaning "the sea" itself, as a potent and impersonal sacred force.

=== Ancestor veneration ===
Among the most intimate and personally significant divine beings are deified ancestors. The relationship between the Balinese and their ancestors is both reverent and practical: the souls of the dead are believed to attain full absorption into the heavenly realm only through purification rites performed by the living. In return, ancestors may bestow protection, blessings, and guidance, sometimes communicating through trance mediums.

The term Bhatara Kawitan refers to the original ancestor of a clan, who is worshipped at family temples and regarded as the spiritual origin of the lineage. Ancestor worship thus forms a central link between domestic ritual life and the wider Balinese cosmological order. Deceased family members are believed to remain spiritually present and capable of influencing the living. Proper rituals ensure their peaceful transition and continued protection of descendants. Major ceremonies, particularly cremation (ngaben), are essential for releasing the soul and enabling reincarnation or spiritual ascent. Ancestors are honoured in family shrines and temples alongside deities.

Ancient kings are also regarded as influential deities in Balinese religion and are believed, on occasion, to manifest during temple anniversary celebrations (odalan), with the manner of their appearance varying in dignity and form.

=== The visible and invisible worlds - Sekala and Niskala ===
Balinese Hinduism recognises an inseparable relationship between the seen (sekala) and unseen (niskala) worlds. Spirits, deities, and forces of chaos coexist with humans and must be acknowledged through offerings, rituals, and ethical behaviour. Not all spiritual forces are benevolent; rituals aim to maintain equilibrium between constructive and destructive energies rather than eliminate one entirely.

This relationship is not expressed solely through formal ritual but is also demonstrated in Balinese performing arts. Shadow puppet theatre (wayang kulit) and the Barong dance symbolically enact the interaction between order and chaos, good and destructive forces, and the visible and invisible worlds.

=== Spatial orientation and sacred geography ===
Balinese Hindu belief assigns spiritual significance to direction and space, reflecting a cosmological order that structures religious life and the built environment. Mountains—particularly Mount Agung—are regarded as sacred abodes of the gods, while the sea is associated with powerful and potentially chaotic forces. This opposition is commonly expressed through the spatial concepts of kaja (towards the mountains, sacred) and kelod (towards the sea, less sacred). Temples, homes, villages, and even seating arrangements are organised according to these spatial principles. Sacred spaces are oriented kaja-ward, while activities associated with everyday or impure functions are placed kelod-ward.

These principles are integrated into the system of Dewata Nawa Sanga, the "nine guardian deities," who preside over the eight cardinal and intercardinal directions and the centre. Each direction is associated with a specific deity, colour, and spiritual quality, together forming a protective cosmic grid that maintains balance and order.

== Sacred texts ==
Balinese Hinduism does not rely on a single canonical scripture. Instead, religious knowledge is drawn from a diverse body of Sanskrit-derived Hindu texts, Old Javanese (Kawi) literature, local ritual manuals, and oral tradition. Sacred texts function primarily as guides for rather than as sources of fixed doctrine.

Balinese Hinduism utilises palm leaf manuscripts (lontar) to record religious scripture, ritual practice, cosmology, and ethics. The refined technique of engraving words in Balinese script on processed palm-leaves originates from pre-modern India and is still practiced on Bali today.

Traditionally, lontar manuscripts were kept and transmitted by Brahmanical and aristocratic elites, religious and ritual specialists, folk healers (balian), and educated commoners. The largest collections are found in Brahmanical households and former royal palaces, but many ordinary families—particularly in northern and eastern Bali—also possess a small number of lontar. One estimate suggests that Bali alone may contain tens of thousands of these manuscripts.

Classical Hindu texts such as the Vedas, Upanishads, Mahabharata, Ramayana, and Puranas are recognised as authoritative in principle, but they are generally known through summaries, commentaries, and adaptations rather than direct textual study.

Old Javanese literary works play a particularly important role in Balinese Hinduism. Texts such as the kakawin and kidung—poetic compositions based on Indian epics and local mythology—form a central part of religious education, temple performance, and moral instruction.

In the modern period, Balinese Hindu institutions have produced standardised interpretations of scripture to align religious teaching with national educational frameworks.

== Practices ==
=== Rituals and ceremonies ===
Ritual life is structured around a complex ceremonial calendar combining the 210-day Pawukon cycle and the lunar Saka calendar. Ceremonies mark temple anniversaries (odalan), agricultural cycles, lifecycle events, and communal purification rites. Major rituals involve the cooperation of extended families, neighbourhood associations (banjar), and temple communities.

=== Offerings and daily devotion ===
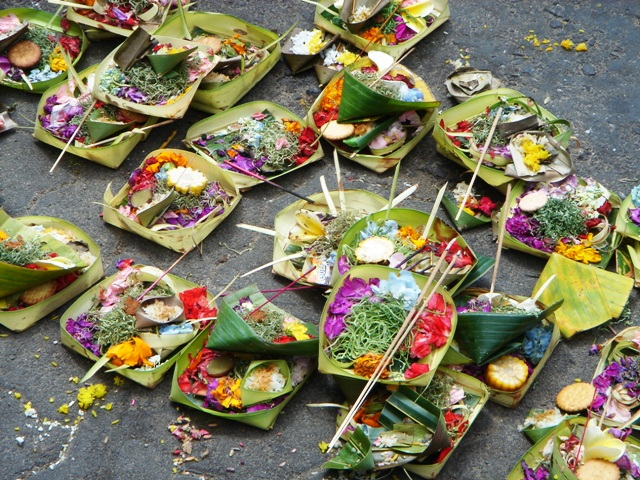
Canang sari offerings

Offerings, known as banten, are a central element of Balinese religious life. They are prepared to give pleasure to both gods and spirits and are believed to generate good karma for those involved in their making.

Family shrines receive offerings daily, typically in the morning and again in the late afternoon. On important ritual days—such as Kajeng–Keliwon, Tilem, Purnama, the Tumpeks, Galungan, and other festivals—more elaborate offerings are prepared. Offerings in the form of canang sari are usually presented by a female member of the household, who must be dressed in proper Balinese ceremonial attire. They are carried on a tray together with a burning incense stick, and the essence of the offering is gently wafted toward the shrine.

Before eating or drinking, many Balinese households prepare coffee with a small sweet and offer it to Sang Hyang Widhi Wasa at the family house temples, accompanied by incense. When rice is first cooked each day, a small portion is set aside on small squares of banana leaf and lightly sprinkled with salt. Commonly numbering between fifteen and twenty, these simple offerings are distributed to key ritual points throughout the family compound, including the kitchen, household shrines, wells or water connections, and entrances or pathways.

For major ceremonies and temple festivals, larger offerings (banten gede) are prepared and taken in procession to temples. These elaborate offerings include cooked foods (rice dishes, cakes, fruit, meat), extensive flower arrangements, incense, and ritual objects arranged in complex palm-leaf structures.

At certain rites—such as odalan and major calendrical ceremonies—animal sacrifice (most commonly chickens, ducks, or pigs) may be included, prepared according to strict ritual rules.

=== Ngejot ===
Ngejot refers to the Hindu ritual of giving food to neighbors as a gesture of gratitude, usually during times of celebrations or holidays. Ngejot is predominantly performed in the province of Bali in Indonesia. The tradition is practiced by the Balinese Hindu community. For Hindus, ngejot is held for Galungan and Nyepi. For Muslims, the tradition is practiced before Eid al-Fitr, the Muslim holiday commemorating the end of Ramadan. The Hindus give food in the form of lawar, an Indonesian pork dish. The ngejot tradition in India symbolizes inter-religious harmony and the brotherhood between Hindus and Muslims.

=== Prayer ===
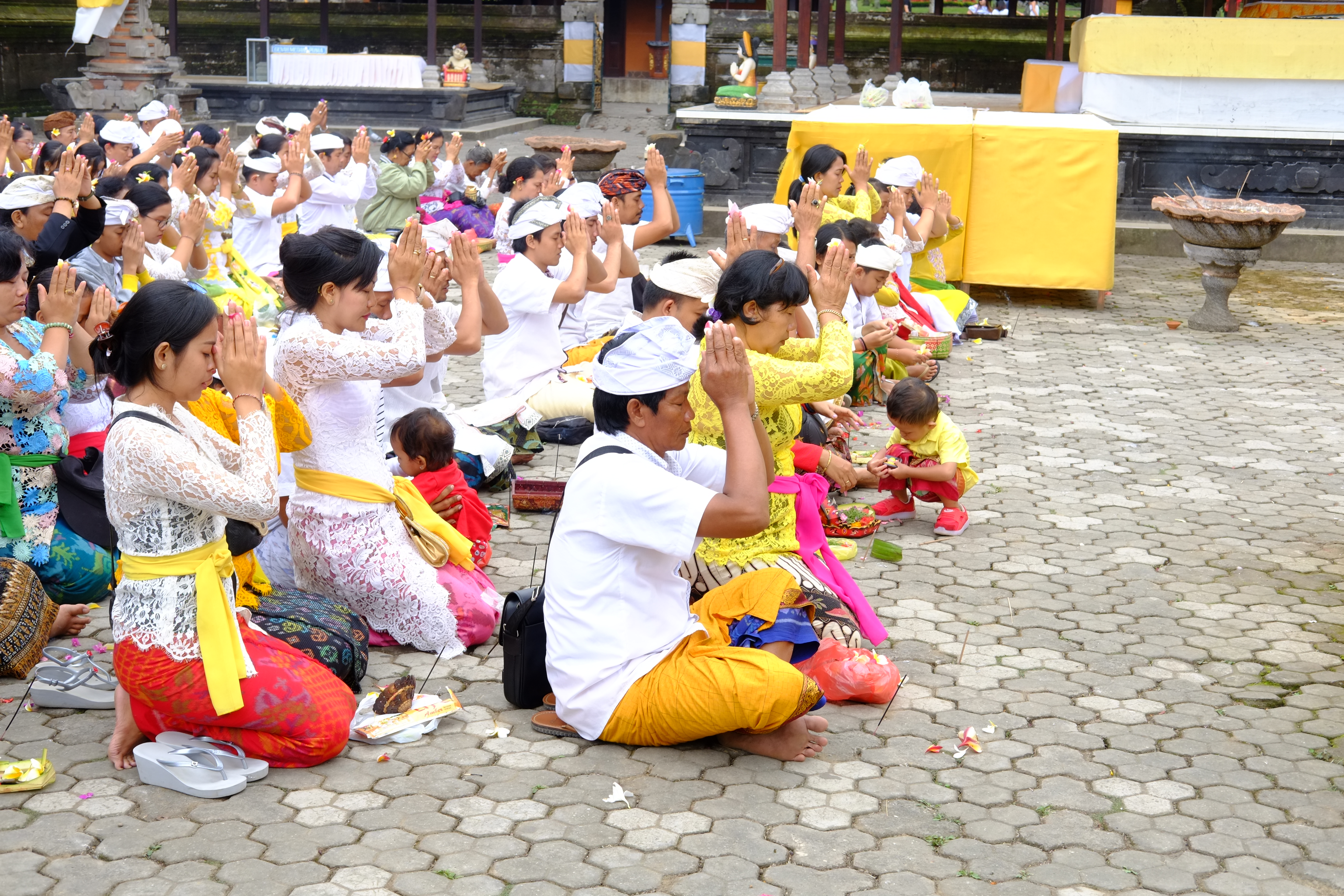
Balinese performing the Kramaning Sembah prayer during a temple ceremony.

Daily prayer in Bali is anchored by Tri Sandhya, a formal prayer recited three times a day. It is rarely recited by Balinese daily and is often broadcast over temple loudspeakers, sometimes mistaken by foreigners for the Muslim call to prayer. Tri Sandhya is also recited by students in schools, reinforcing its role as a shared civic and religious practice. The prayer consists of six verses.

Prayer posture varies by context. Men sit cross-legged in padmasana, while women sit in the heel position (bajrasana). In schools, prayer is usually performed standing (pada asana). When reciting prayers, the hands are cupped like a lotus flower at the chest, symbolising purity and offering. Tri Sandhya is recited at ceremonies, though it may be omitted due to its length when ritual schedules are tight.

Ceremonial worship centres on Kramaning Sembah. Krama means manners and Sembah means appreciation. It is also known as Panca Sembah ("five worships"). This structured sequence involves praying to Sang Hyang Widhi five times. The hands are raised to the head as mantras are recited; then raised again holding a flower, with mantras repeated three times, followed by a final repetition without a flower. The hands remain lifted for as long as the priest rings the bell (genta), marking the climax of the prayer.

At the conclusion, worshippers receive holy water (tirtha): it is sprinkled by the priest (pemangku) three times, then received in the right hand and drunk three times, followed by splashing it onto the forehead three times. Finally, water-soaked rice (bija) is given—a few grains are eaten, and the remainder pressed onto the forehead.

=== Temple worship ===
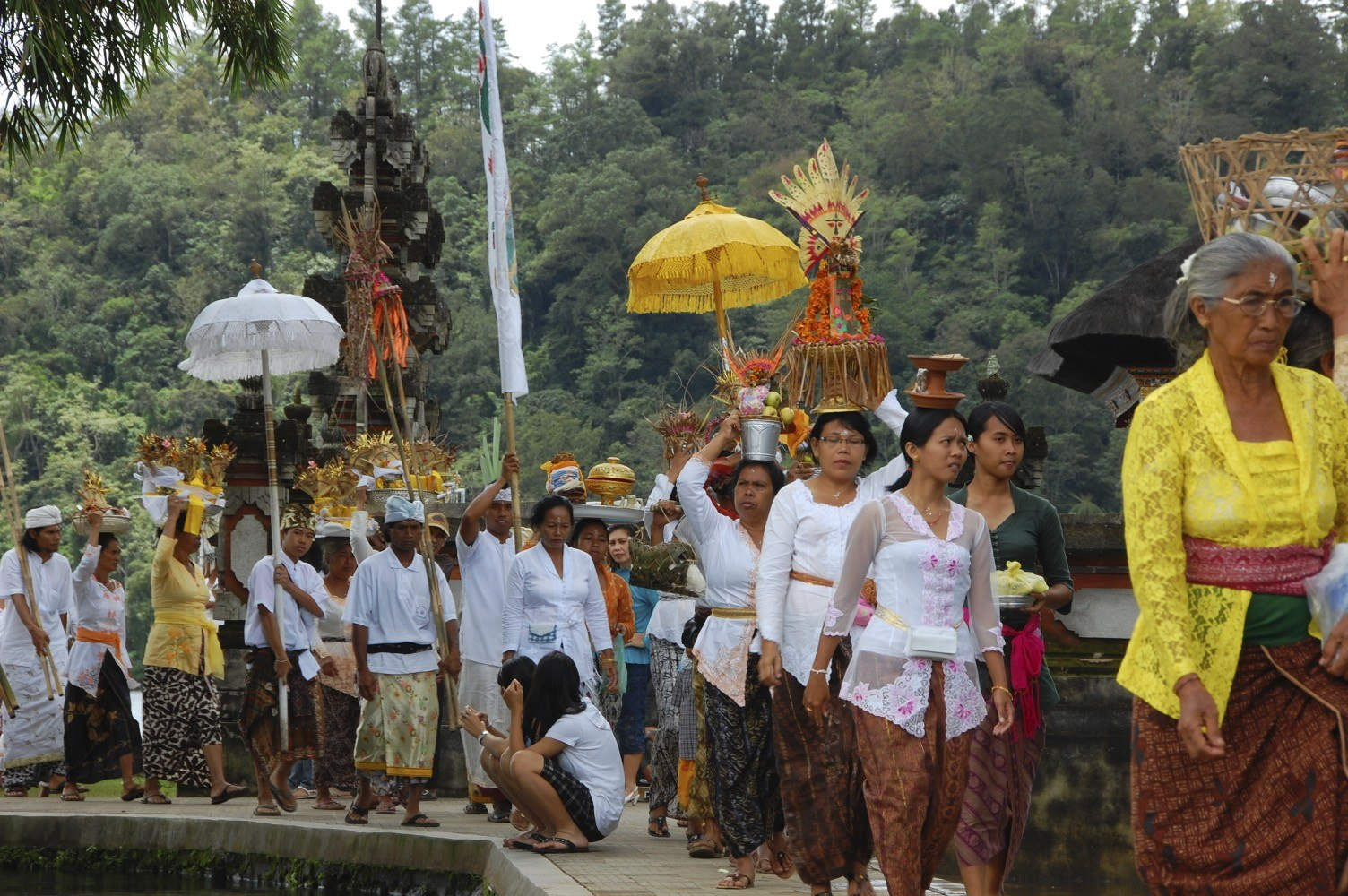
Procession with offerings entering a Hindu temple in Bali

Temples (pura) are the central institutions of religious life in Balinese Hinduism. Bali is home to tens of thousands of temples, commonly estimated at over 20,000, ranging from small family shrines and neighbourhood temples to major regional and island-wide sanctuaries.

Balinese temples are organised according to sacred spatial principles that reflect cosmic order and direction, and are dedicated to specific deities, ancestral lineages, natural forces, or communal functions. Every level of social organisation—family, clan, village, irrigation association (subak), and kingdom—maintains its own temples, each with distinct ritual obligations.

Temple worship is communal rather than congregational. Individuals participate as members of families, villages, or ritual groups, with temple festivals (odalan) structured around collective responsibility rather than individual devotion.

Among the most significant temples are:

- Besakih Temple – Regarded as the "Mother Temple" of Bali, located on the slopes of Mount Agung. It is the most important temple complex on the island and serves as a central site of worship for all Balinese Hindus, encompassing multiple temples dedicated to major deities and ancestral lineages.
- Pura Ulun Danu Batur – A major water temple associated with Lake Batur and the regulation of irrigation and fertility, central to Bali’s agricultural cosmology.
- Pura Tanah Lot – A sea temple associated with protection and balance between land and ocean forces.
- Pura Luhur Uluwatu – One of Bali’s directional temples, guarding the island’s southwestern spiritual boundary.

=== Purification and holy water ===
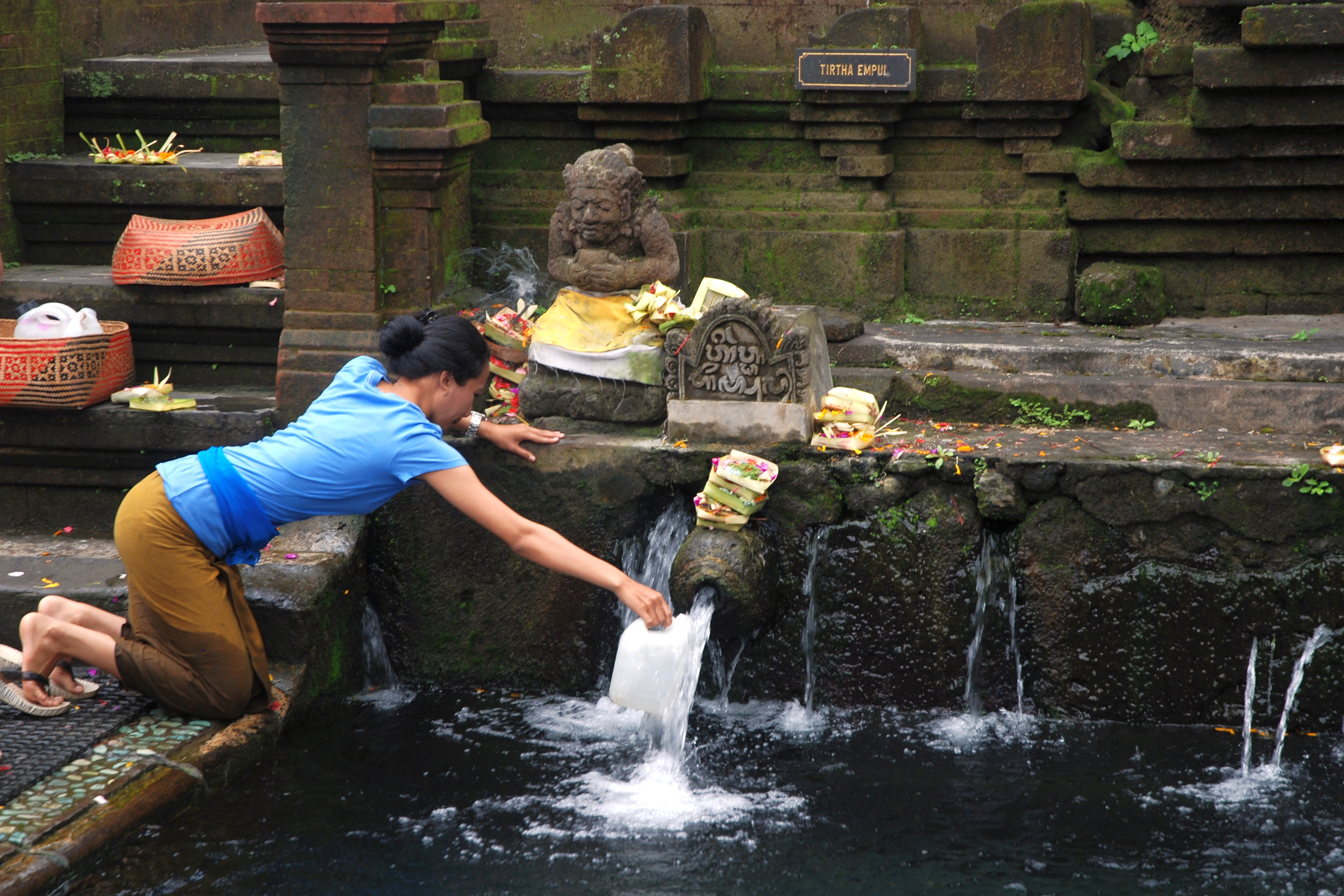
The spring waters at Pura Tirta Empul are considered highly sacred. Balinese pilgrims will bathe in its waters to undertake the melukat cleansing ritual.

Purification rites are fundamental to Balinese Hindu practice, which is often referred to as Agama Tirtha ("the religion of holy water"). Holy water (tirtha) is regarded as a primary medium of divine power and accompanies every act of Balinese Hindu worship where it is believed to "cleanse spiritual impurities, fend off evil forces, and render the recipient immune to the attacks of negative or demonic influences". The theological basis for holy water comes from the Bhagavad Gita where Krishna says, "If one disciplined soul proffers to me with love a leaf, a flower, fruit or water, I accept this offering of love from him."

The High Balinese word for water tirtha and Middle Balinese toya are used to distinguish holy water from ordinary water which is called yeh using Low Balinese. Holy water is created by priests every morning by reciting mantras and the use of ritual hand gestures (mudras). Whilst all holy water is considered sacred, some holy water is considered more powerful. Water derived from sacred places or created through the use of more powerful mantras is believed to contain more mystic energy. Holy water used in every day temple worship may not come from as significant a source high in the mountains as what may be required for water used for important rites such as a temple ceremony or cremation.

=== Priesthood and ritual specialists ===
A brahmana or priest performing a ritual at Pura Tirta Empul

Priests and ritual specialists hold a central position in Balinese Hinduism, guiding religious practice to maintain social order and cosmic balance. Broadly, ritual specialists are organised into two hierarchical categories—Dwijati ("twice-born") and Ekajati ("once-born")—within which three functional roles are commonly distinguished: pedanda (high priests), pemangku (temple priests), and balian (ritual healers and mediums).

The Golongan Dwijati comprises the highest-ranking priests. Following extensive training, candidates undergo a major purification ceremony symbolising a second birth, from which the term dwijati derives. This group includes titles such as Rsi, Empu, Pandita, Sulinggih, Pedanda, Bujangga, Dukuh, Bhagawan, and Dang Hyang, with pedanda commonly used as an umbrella term. Pedanda are not usually attached to a single temple but serve communities connected to them through lineage or tradition. Their responsibilities include preparing the most ritually potent holy water (tirta) for major temple festivals and officiating key life-cycle rites such as tooth filing and cremation. In ritual performance they employ sacred gestures (mudra) and mantras. Most are pedanda Siwa, following Shaivite traditions, while a smaller number are pedanda Buda, drawing on Buddhist textual and ritual lineages; some ceremonies require priests of both types to officiate together.

The Golongan Ekajati encompasses other ritual specialists who undergo a lesser purification. This group includes pemangku, pinandita, wasi, mangku, balian, mangku dalang, pengeman, and dang acarya, with pemangku often used as a general term. Pemangku are temple priests responsible for daily and periodic rituals. Dressed in white and drawn from any caste other than Brahman, they consecrate offerings, prepare holy water, and lead temple ceremonies.

Balian function as healers, diviners, and mediums. Through spiritual power known as taksu, they may enter trance states in which gods or ancestors communicate through them. Balian are consulted to diagnose illness, identify spiritual causes of misfortune, and, in some cases, determine signs of reincarnation.

=== Ceremonial dress ===
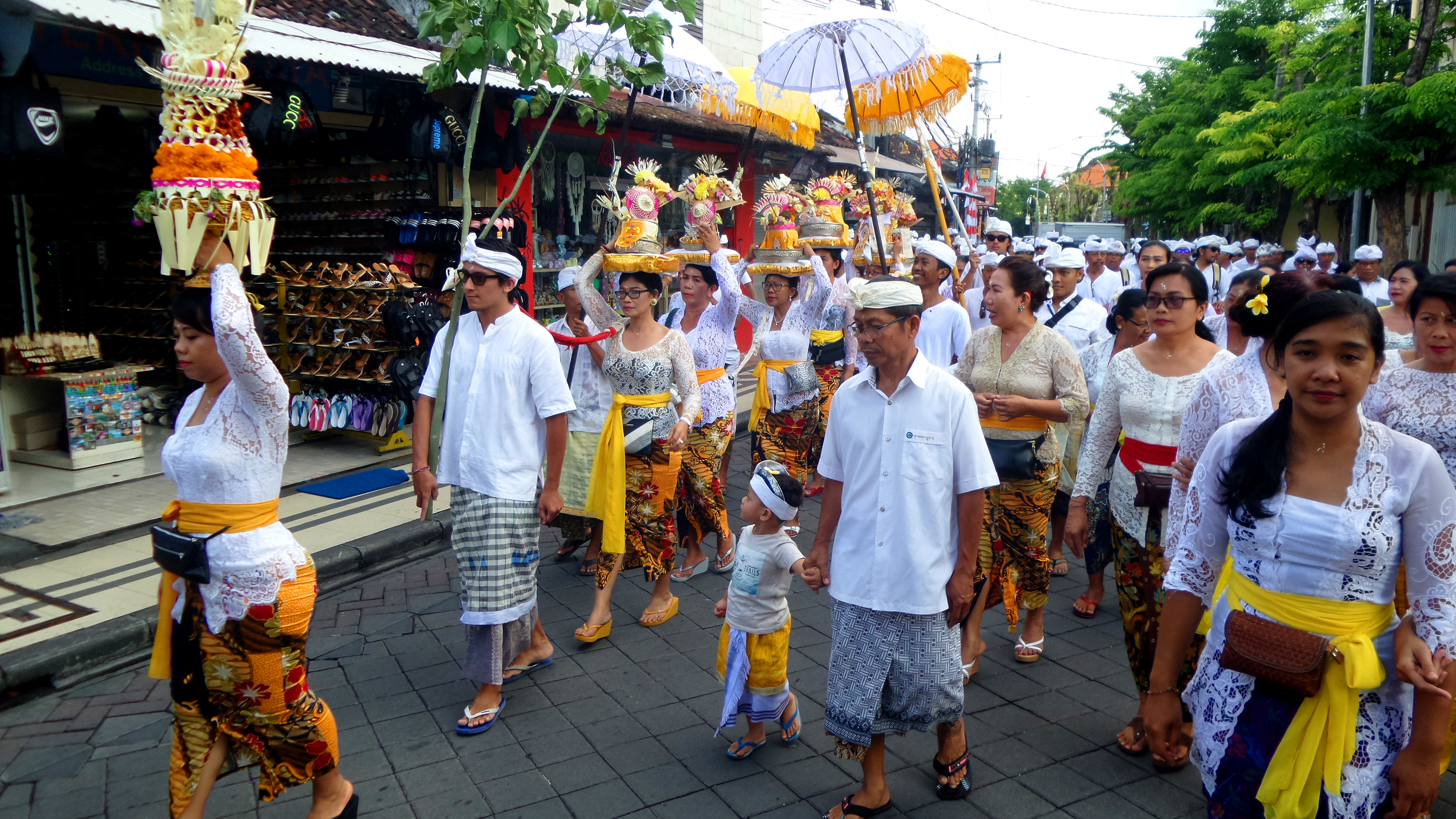
Balinese in procession to a temple wearing traditional ceremonial dress

When dressed in full ceremonial attire, the body is symbolically divided into three parts. For men, the kamen (sarong) and saput (outer cloth) cover the lower body, while the udeng (headcloth) separates the head from the body. This division reflects the Balinese three-level conception of the universe: bhurloka (lower realm), bhuwah (human world), and suarga (heavenly realm).

The udeng, worn daily by Balinese men, has defined philosophical meaning. The right fold must be higher than the left, symbolising the supremacy of dharma (righteous conduct) over adharma (unrighteous conduct). The knot is placed at the centre of the forehead, representing the focus and origin of the mind, while the upward edge signifies concentration directed toward the divine. The udeng is also interpreted as embodying the Tri Murti, with its folds symbolically associated with Brahma, Vishnu, and Shiva.

Women customarily wear a kamen wrapped tightly around the lower body, a kebaya (fitted blouse) covering the upper body and shoulders, and a selendang (sash) tied at the waist. As with men, the sash carries symbolic meaning, representing self-restraint and the ordering of the body during worship. Hair is typically tied up or neatly arranged, and shoulders and legs must be covered.

Colours are generally modest—most commonly white or yellow—signifying ritual purity, though variations may occur for specific ceremonies or temple anniversaries (odalan). Darker and brighter colours are worn for weddings, and even darker colours are preferred at cremations (ngadben).

=== Performance ===
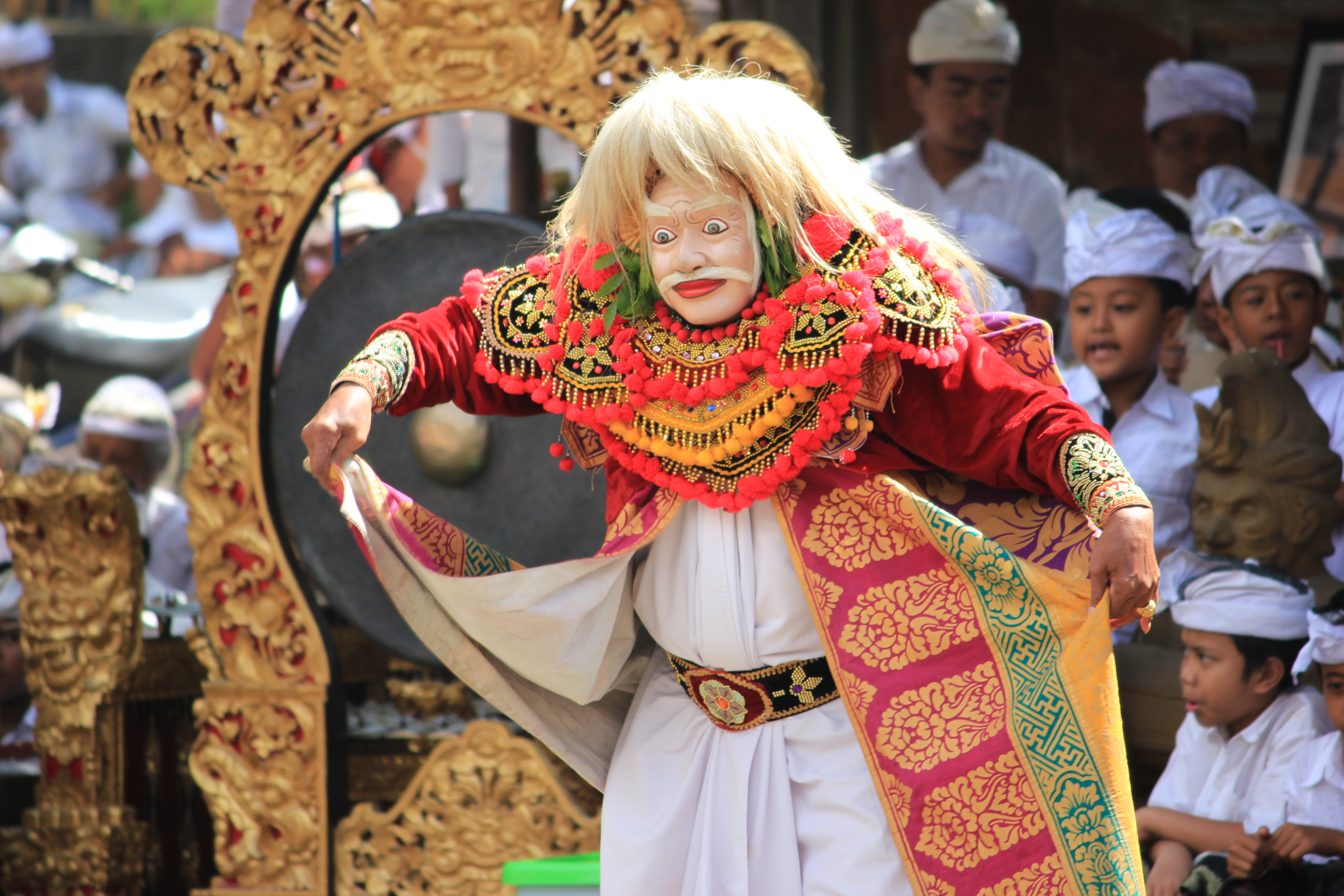
Traditional mask (topeng) dance as part of a temple ceremony at Bangli

Performance is central to Balinese Hinduism and is understood primarily as ritual offering rather than entertainment. Dance, music, and shadow theatre are integral to temple festivals, rites of passage, and calendrical ceremonies, where they serve to honour the gods, maintain cosmic balance (dharma), and protect the community.

Balinese dance is closely tied to ritual context and is traditionally classified as sacred (wali), ceremonial (bebali), or entertainment (balih-balihan), with sacred and ceremonial forms performed within temple precincts as offerings. Musical accompaniment is provided by gamelan ensembles, whose interlocking rhythms structure ritual time and accompany dance and drama.

Wayang kulit (shadow puppet theatre) has a distinct religious role. Performed by a priest-puppeteer (dalang), it draws on Hindu epics and local myth to communicate cosmological and ethical teachings, and in ritual contexts is believed to possess spiritual and purificatory power.

=== Lifecycle ceremonies ===
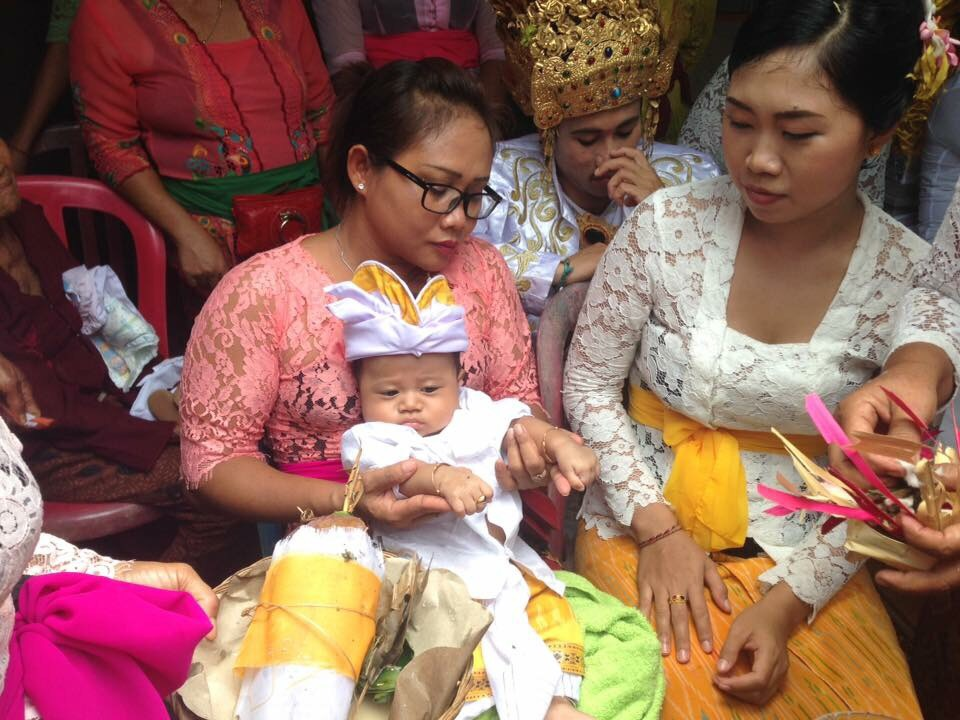
The rite of Nelu Bulanin

Balinese Hinduism places strong emphasis on rites of passage, including birth rituals, tooth-filing (metatah), marriage, and cremation (ngaben). These ceremonies mark transitions in spiritual and social status and are essential for maintaining harmony between the individual, family, ancestors, and the wider community.

There are a total of thirteen ceremonies concerned with life from conception until, but not including, death, each of which has four elements: placation of evil spirits, purification with holy water, wafting of the essence, and prayer. These ceremonies mark major events in a person's life, including birth, puberty, grain feeding, and marriage.

A newborn baby is believed to represent the soul of an ancestor and is regarded as a god for the first 42 days of its life. However, the mother is regarded as impure and is not allowed to participate in any religious activities during this period. A baby must not touch the impure ground until it is 105 days old, halfway to the celebration of its first birthday according to the 210-day Balinese Pawukon calendar. Once it reaches its first birthday, the child's family will celebrate the Otonan birthday ceremony. Once the child reaches puberty, the six upper canine teeth are filed until they are even.

=== Death rites and cremation ===
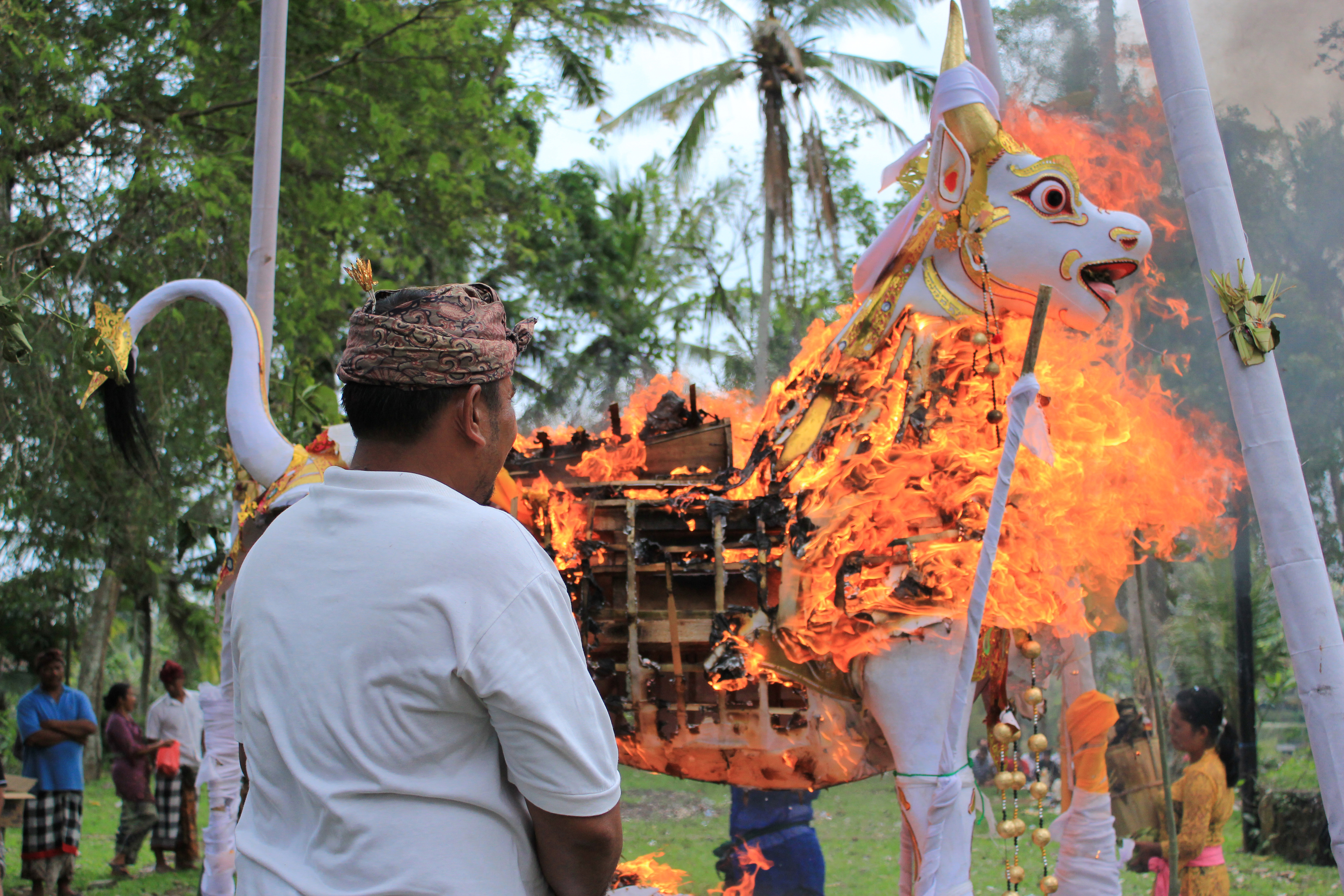
Balinese ngaben ceremony

The most important ceremonies take place after death and result in the soul being freed to be eventually reincarnated (samsara). Unlike the death rites of other religions, the physical body is not the focus, as it is seen as nothing more than a temporary container of the soul and fit only for expedient disposal. In fact, the body must be burned before the soul can leave it completely. The Balinese cremation ceremony (ngaben) to bring this about can be extremely expensive because an elaborate ceremony is a way of showing respect for a soul destined to become a god with considerable powers over those left behind. Therefore, bodies are sometimes temporarily buried until the family can accumulate enough funds for cremation, although the bodies of priests or high-class families are preserved above ground.

=== Dietary law ===
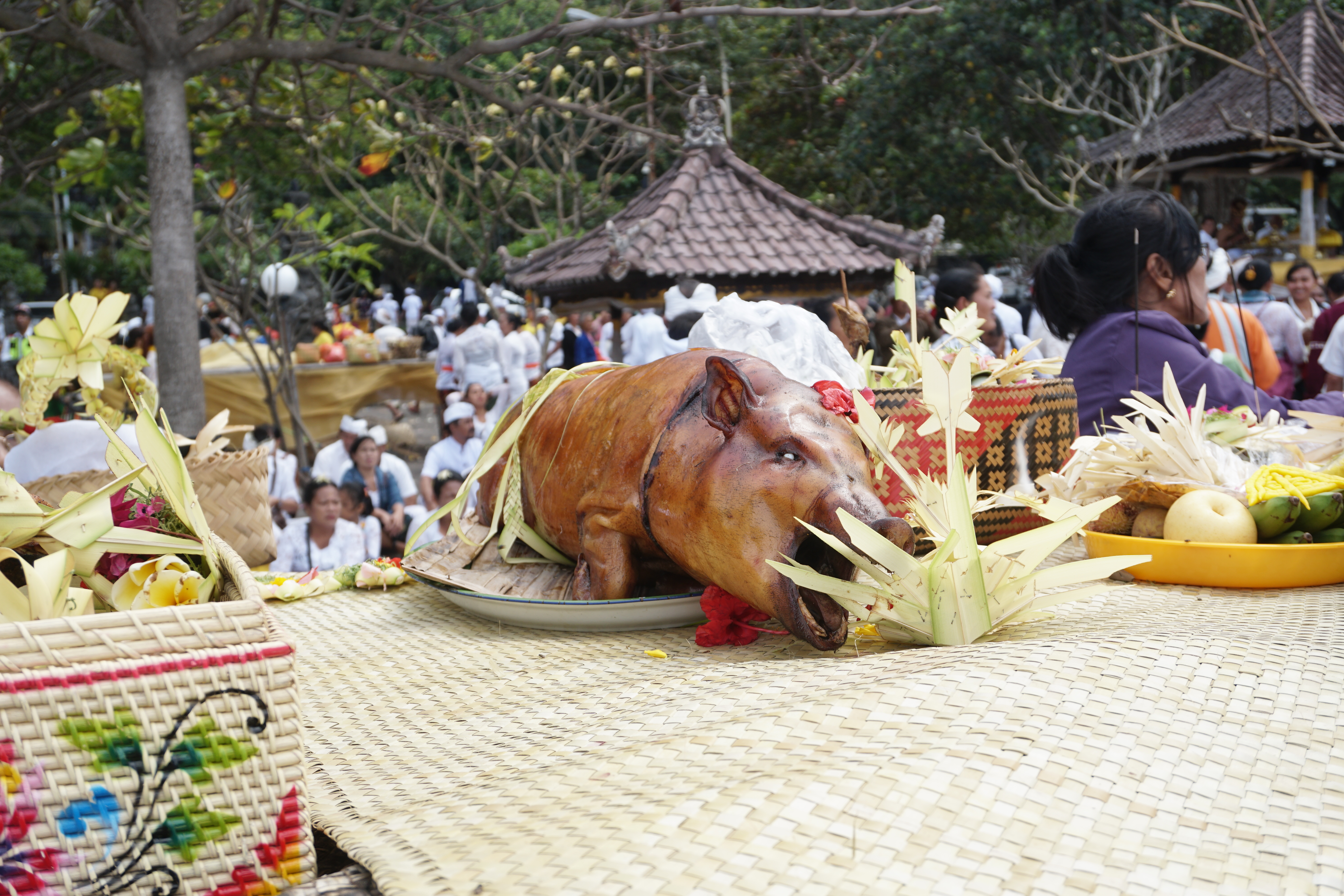
Unlike the rest of Muslim dominated Indonesia, pork is commonly eaten by Balinese Hindus, especially during ceremonies in the form of babi guling.

Balinese Hinduism does not prescribe a single, universal dietary code. Dietary practice has historically been shaped by ritual context, social status, and local custom rather than by permanent religious prohibitions comparable to those found in some other traditions.

Historically, dietary distinctions existed between caste groups (wangsa), particularly in relation to ritual purity and social etiquette. Higher-status groups, especially Brahmana households, often observed stricter dietary practices, including avoidance of certain meats or foods such as beef or abstaining from alcohol. In the past, Balinese were said to be forbidden from consuming flesh of human, cat, monkey, dog, crocodile, mouse, snake, frog, certain poisonous fish, leech, stinging insect, crow, eagle, owl, or any other bird of prey.

Priests and ritual specialists traditionally follow more regulated dietary discipline during consecration, fasting, or purification periods. Such restrictions are situational and temporary, intended to maintain ritual balance rather than moral purity.

== Festivals ==
=== Galungan and Kuningan ===
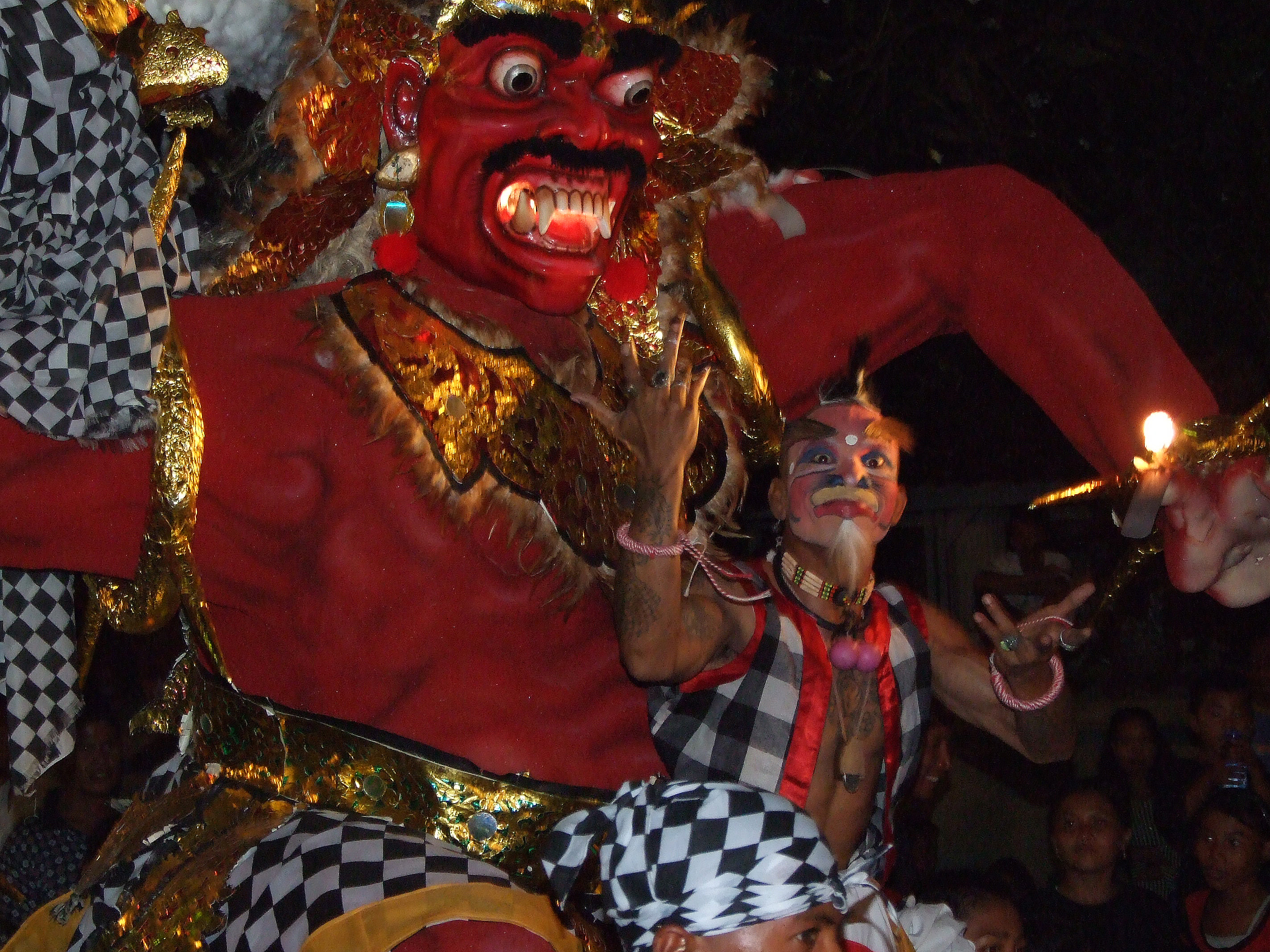
Ogoh-ogoh procession on the eve of Nyepi

The most important festival is Galungan (related to Deepavali), a celebration of the triumph of dharma over adharma. It is calculated according to the 210-day Balinese Pawukon calendar and takes place on the Wednesday (Buda) of the eleventh week (Dunggulan). According to tradition, the spirits of the dead descend from Heaven, to return ten days later on Kuningan.

=== Nyepi ===
Nyepi, or the Day of Silence, makes the start of the Balinese Saka year and is marked on the first day of the 10th month, Kedasa. It usually falls in March.

=== Other festivals ===
Watugunung, the last day of the Pawukon calendar, is devoted to Saraswati, goddess of learning. Although it is devoted to books, reading is not allowed.

The fourth day of the year is called Pagerwesi, meaning "iron fence". It commemorates a battle between good and evil.

The Hindu festival of Maha Shivaratri is celebrated by Balinese Hindus as Siwa Ratri.

== Caste system ==
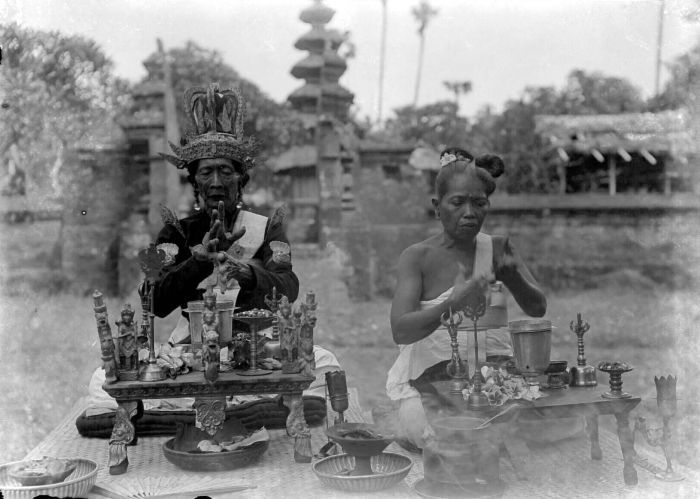
Buda pedanda with his wife

Balinese Hinduism has traditionally recognised a system of social classification known as wangsa or varna, shaped by indigenous Balinese social organisation and later Hindu-Javanese influence. While it uses Sanskrit-derived terminology, the Balinese system differs from Indian caste systems in that it has never functioned as a rigid hierarchy based on occupation or ritual purity. Caste affiliation is most visibly expressed through personal names and titles and historically influenced levels of speech in the Balinese language. Inter-caste marriage has long occurred and has never been absolutely prohibited.

Balinese Hindu society is commonly described as comprising four broad categories (catur wangsa):

- Brahmana - Traditionally associated with priesthood and religious scholarship. Brahmana families historically supplied high priests (pedanda) who officiate major rituals, though priestly authority in contemporary Bali is no longer restricted to hereditary Brahmana lineages.
- Satria - Associated with royal houses, nobility, and former ruling elites. Many Balinese kings and aristocratic families belonged to this group, which historically played leading roles in governance and court ritual.
- Wesia - A small and less clearly defined category, historically linked to administration and commerce. In practice, Wesya status has had limited social distinction in Bali compared to other categories.
- Sudra - The majority of the population, encompassing farmers, artisans, and village-based communities. Unlike in Indian caste systems, Sudra Balinese have always fully participated in temple worship, communal rituals, and religious life.

Since the 20th century, caste distinctions in Bali have declined in social and legal importance. Reformist interpretations of Hinduism emphasise vocation and religious practice over inherited status, expanding access to priesthood and diminishing caste as a determinant of social position. Today, caste functions largely as a cultural and historical identity marker within Balinese Hinduism.

== Administration ==
Balinese Hinduism is formally regulated and administered through a combination of Indonesian state institutions and Balinese religious and customary authorities. This dual system reflects Indonesia’s constitutional framework for recognised religions alongside Bali’s long-standing system of customary law (adat).

At the national level, Balinese Hinduism is recognised as an official religion of Indonesia under the name Agama Hindu Dharma. Oversight is exercised by the Ministry of Religious Affairs (Kementerian Agama), which is responsible for religious education, registration of religious officials, state-recognised ceremonies, and the administration of religious affairs across all recognised faiths. Hindu religious education in public schools and universities, as well as the certification of Hindu teachers and clergy, falls under this ministry.

Religious doctrine, ritual standards, and theological interpretation are primarily guided by the Parisada Hindu Dharma Indonesia (PHDI), the national Hindu council. PHDI serves as the principal representative body for Hindus in Indonesia and plays a central role in defining theology, issuing religious guidance, standardising ritual practice, and representing Hindu interests to the state. It has been instrumental in articulating key concepts such as Sang Hyang Widhi Wasa to meet national requirements for monotheistic belief.

At the provincial and local level in Bali, religious life is closely intertwined with customary governance. The Majelis Desa Adat coordinates and oversees desa adat (customary villages), which are responsible for temple management, ritual calendars, community obligations, and the enforcement of customary religious norms. While desa adat operate independently of the state administrative village system (desa dinas), they are formally recognised under Balinese provincial law.

Temples (pura) are administered locally by temple councils and village institutions, with ritual authority exercised by priests (pedanda, pemangku) operating within frameworks recognised by both PHDI and local customary bodies. In practice, governance of Balinese Hinduism relies on cooperation between state regulation, religious councils, and customary institutions rather than centralised control.

== Outside Bali and Indonesia ==
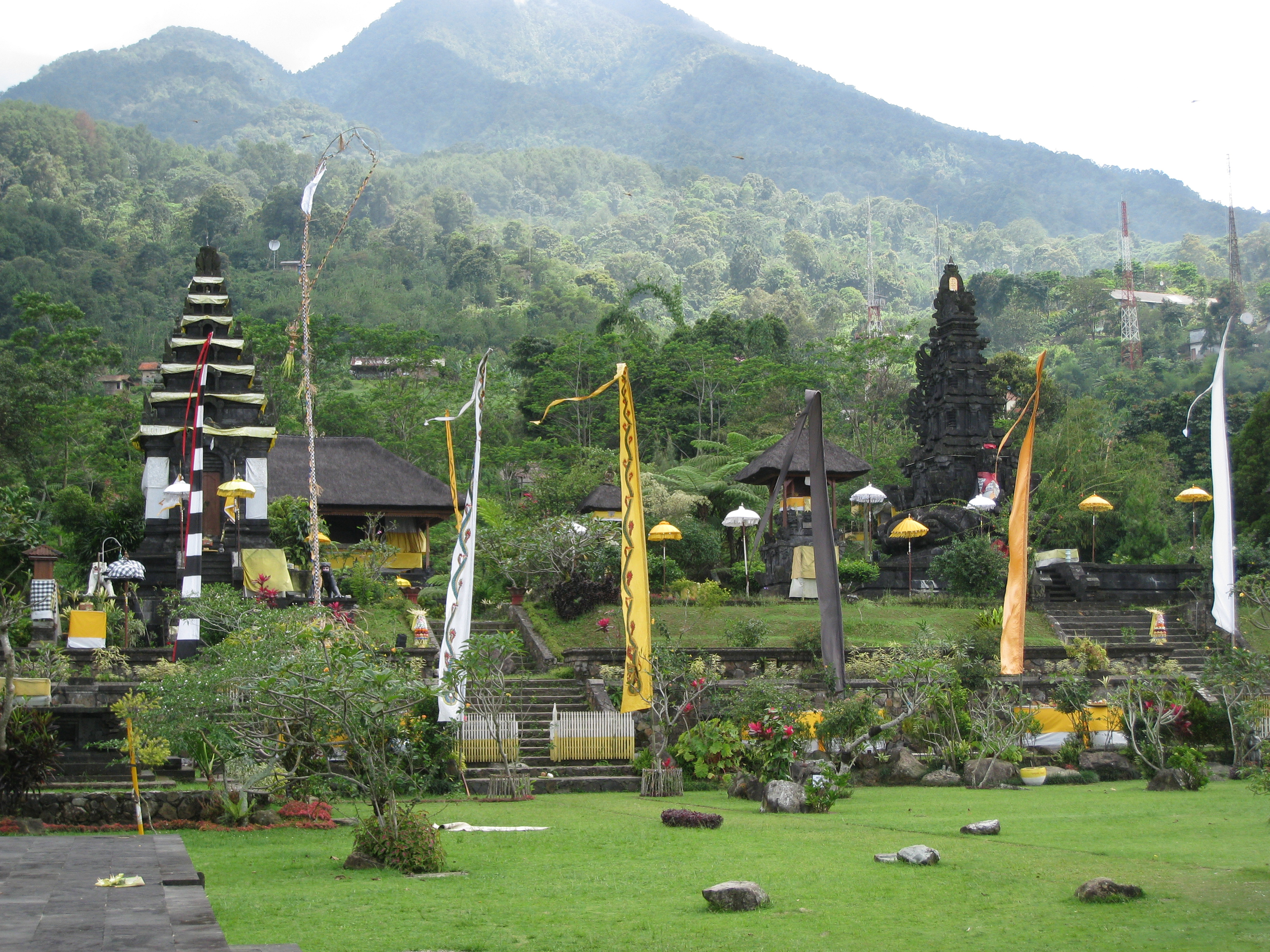
Pura Parahyangan Agung Jagatkarta in Bogor, West Java

Balinese Hindus built Pura Parahyangan Agung Jagatkarta, the second largest temple in Indonesia after Pura Besakih in Bali, dedicated to Hindu Sundanese King Sri Baduga Maharaja Sang Ratu Jaya Dewata Prabu Siliwangi. Pura Aditya Jaya is the largest temple in Indonesian capital Jakarta.

At least four Balinese Hindu temples exist in Europe. A padmasana exists in Hamburg, Germany in front of the Museum of Ethnology, Hamburg. Pura Girinatha in Dili, Timor Leste, was built by Indonesian immigrants. The recently constructed Pura Tri Hita Karana is located in Erholungspark Marzahn park in Berlin, Germany. Two temples exist in the Pairi Daiza botanical garden in Belgium. A temple was inaugurated in May 2025 in Kallenkote, Indonesia.

== See also ==
- Hinduism in Indonesia
- Hinduism in Southeast Asia
- Hinduism in Java
- Hinduism in Timor-Leste
- Candi of Indonesia
- Indonesian Esoteric Buddhism
- Indosphere
- Javanese Kshatriya
- Kakawin Sutasoma
- Kejawèn
- Sunda Wiwitan
