= Otonan =

Ceremonial birthday carried out in Bali, Indonesia

Otonan is a Balinese Hindu birth ceremony (ceremonial birthday) carried out in Bali, Indonesia.

Six months, or 210 days, after a child is born, the ceremony is carried out according to the Balinese Pawukon calendar, either during Sapta Wara, or Panca Wara. The purpose of this ceremony is to make up for the errors and evils of prior life to achieve a more perfect life by expressing gratitude to ancestors and Sang Hyang Widhi Wasa. It is led by a Hindu priest or family elder.

During the first Otonan ceremony, a haircut ritual is typically involved and the ceremony is very festive. The ceremony will continue to be celebrated throughout a person's life in conjunction with their birthday.

A white thread bracelet called "beneng" is given after the Otonan ceremony is complete.
