= Canang sari =

Daily offering in Balinese Hinduism

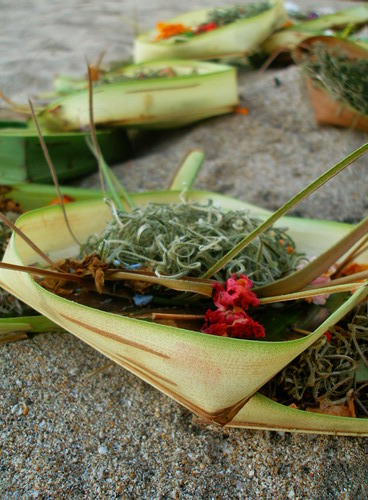
Canang sari on the Kuta Beach sand

Canang sari (Balinese: ᬘᬦᬂᬲᬭᬶ) is one of the daily offerings made by Balinese to thank the nine guardian deities - Dewata Nawa Sanga - in praise and prayer. Canang sari will be seen in the Balinese temples (pura), on small shrines in houses, and on the ground or as a part of a larger offering.

== Etymology ==
The phrase canang sari is derived from the Balinese words sari (essence) and canang (a small palm-leaf basket as the tray). Canang itself consists of two syllables from the Kawi language: ca (beautiful) and nang (purpose).

== Parts ==
Canang sari has some parts; there are peporosan, ceper, raka-raka, and sampian urasari. Peporosan or the core material is made from betel leaf, banana leaf, lime, gambier, prestige, tobacco and betel nuts. Material of peporosan symbolizes the Trimurti, the three major Hindu Gods. Shiva is symbolized by lime, Vishnu is symbolized by betel nut, and Brahma is symbolized by gambier. Canang sari are covered by ceper (a tray made from palm leaf) as a symbol of Ardha Candra. Raka-raka is topped with sampian urasari, which are in turn overlaid by flowers placed in a specific direction. Each direction symbolizes a Hindu God (deva):

- White-colored flowers that point to the east as a symbol of Iswara
- Red-colored flowers that point to the south as a symbol of Brahma
- Yellow-colored flowers that point to the west as a symbol of Mahadeva
- Blue or green colored flowers that point to the north as a symbol of Vishnu

A canang sari is completed by placing on top of the canang an amount of kepeng (the coin money) or paper money, which is said to make up the essence (the "sari") of the offering.

== Usage ==
Canang sari is offered every day to Sang Hyang Widhi Wasa as a form of thanking for the peace given to the world; it is the simplest daily household offering. The philosophy behind the offering is self-sacrifice in that they take time and effort to prepare. Canang sari is not offered when there is a death in the community or family. Canang sari is also used on certain days, such as: Kliwon, Purnama, and Tilem.

== Gallery ==
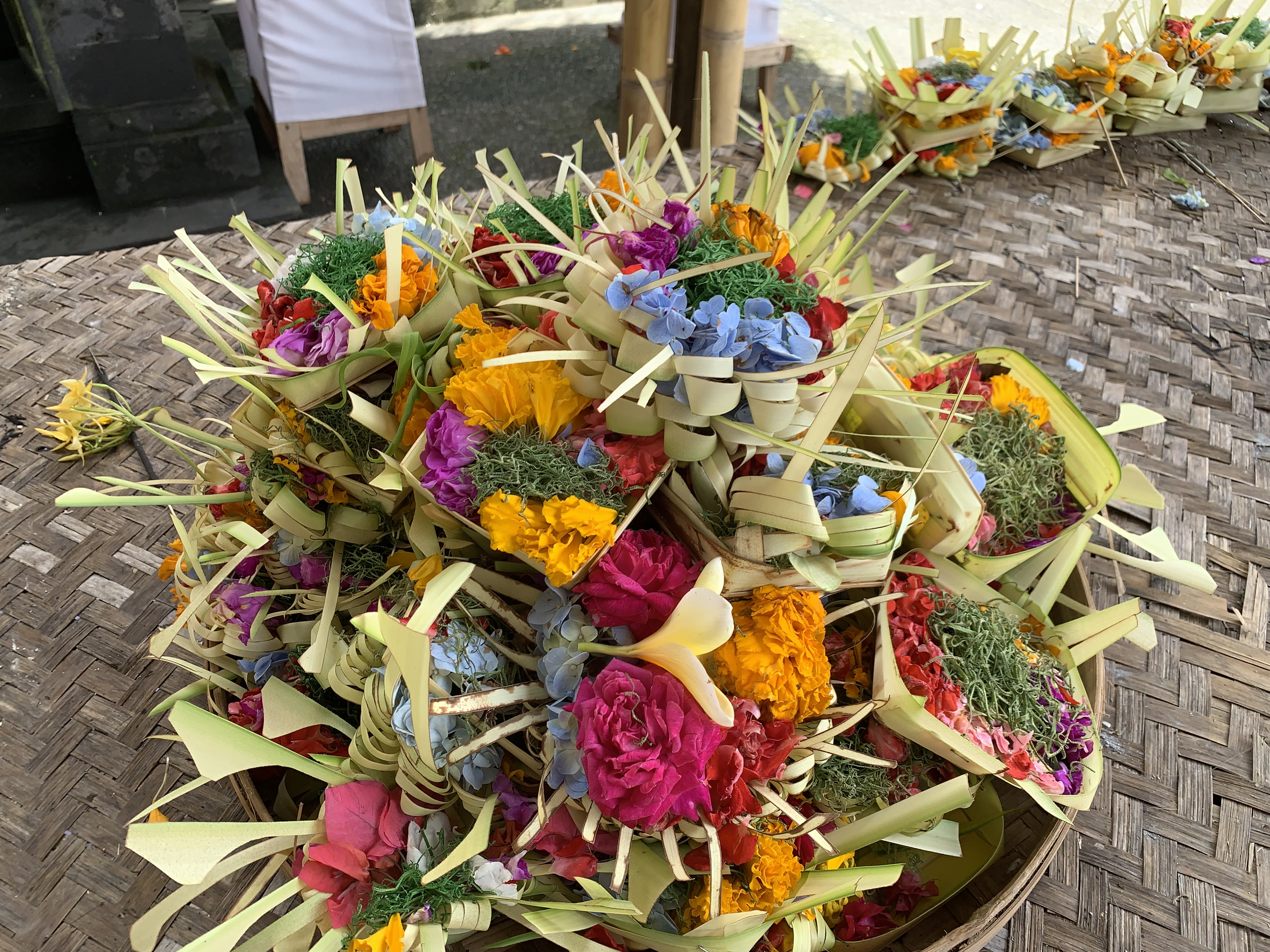
A tray of Canangs offered at Goa Gajah

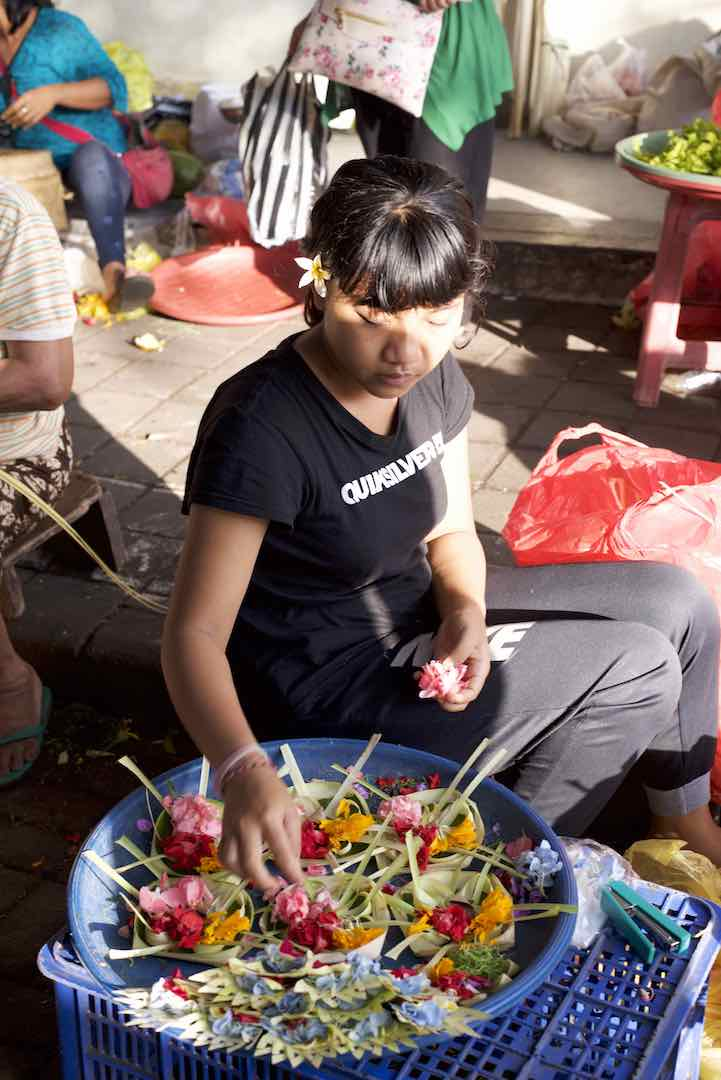
Young Balinese woman making canang to sell at the local pasar (market).

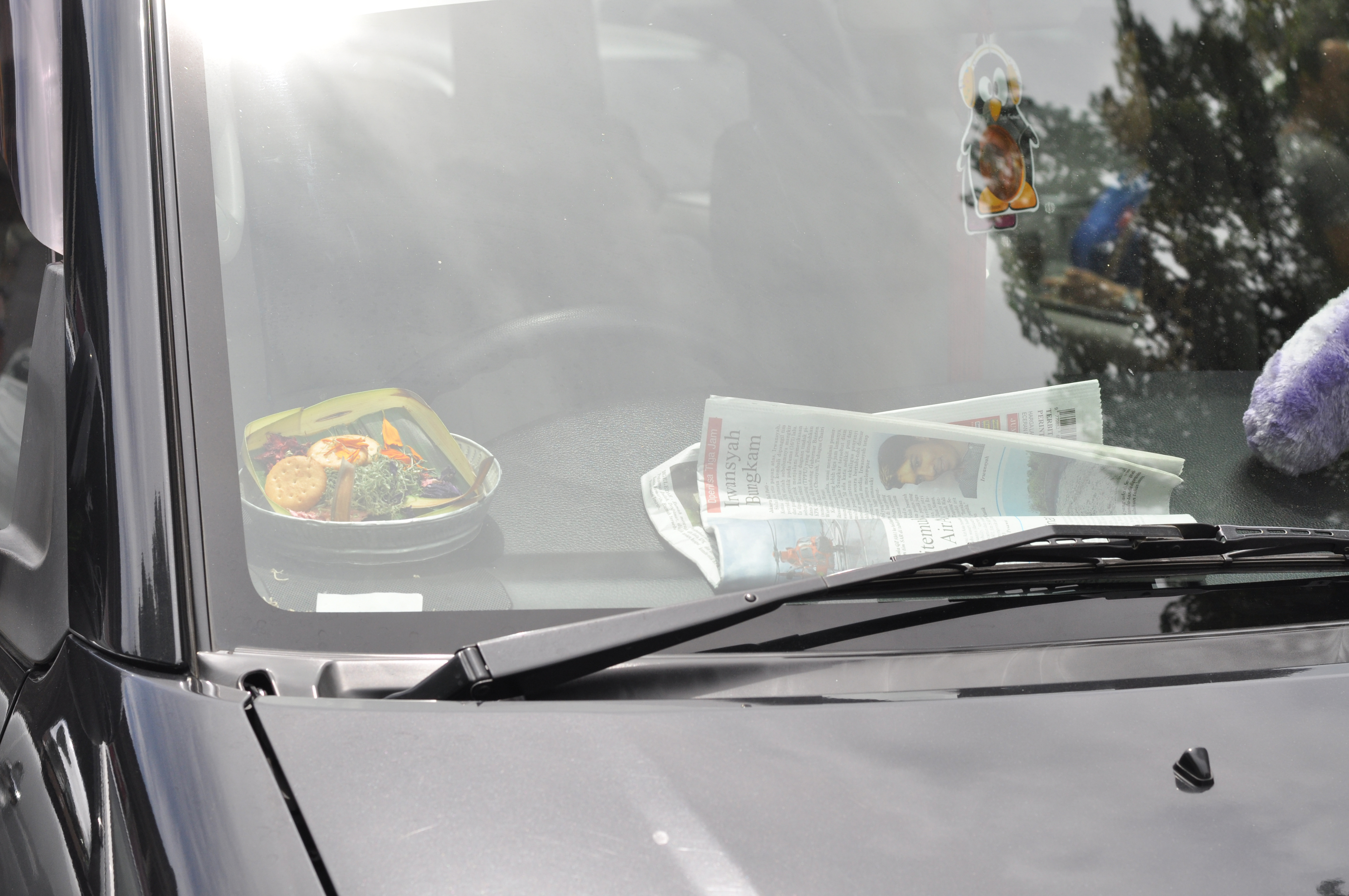
Canang inside a car

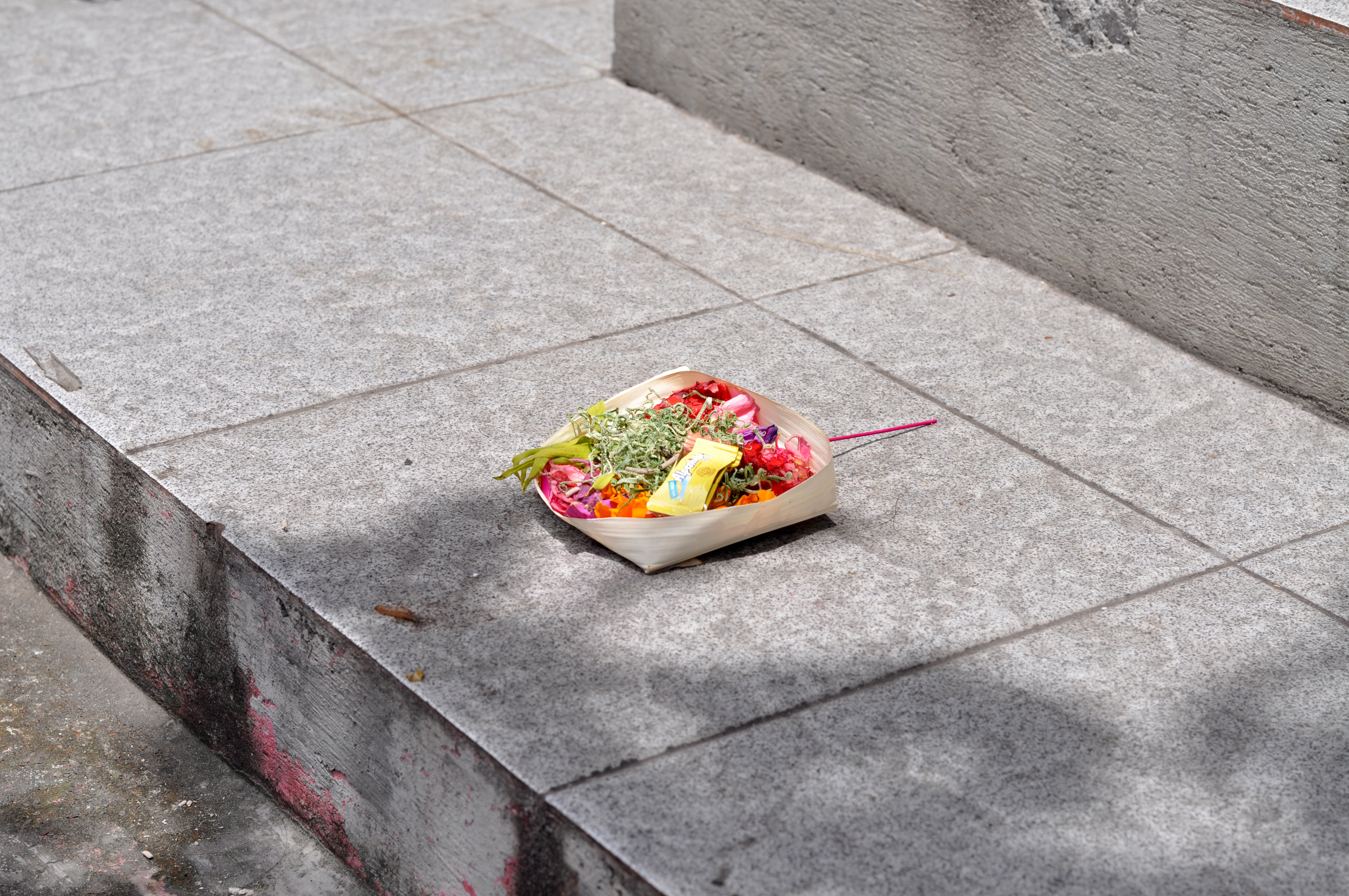
Canang on the road

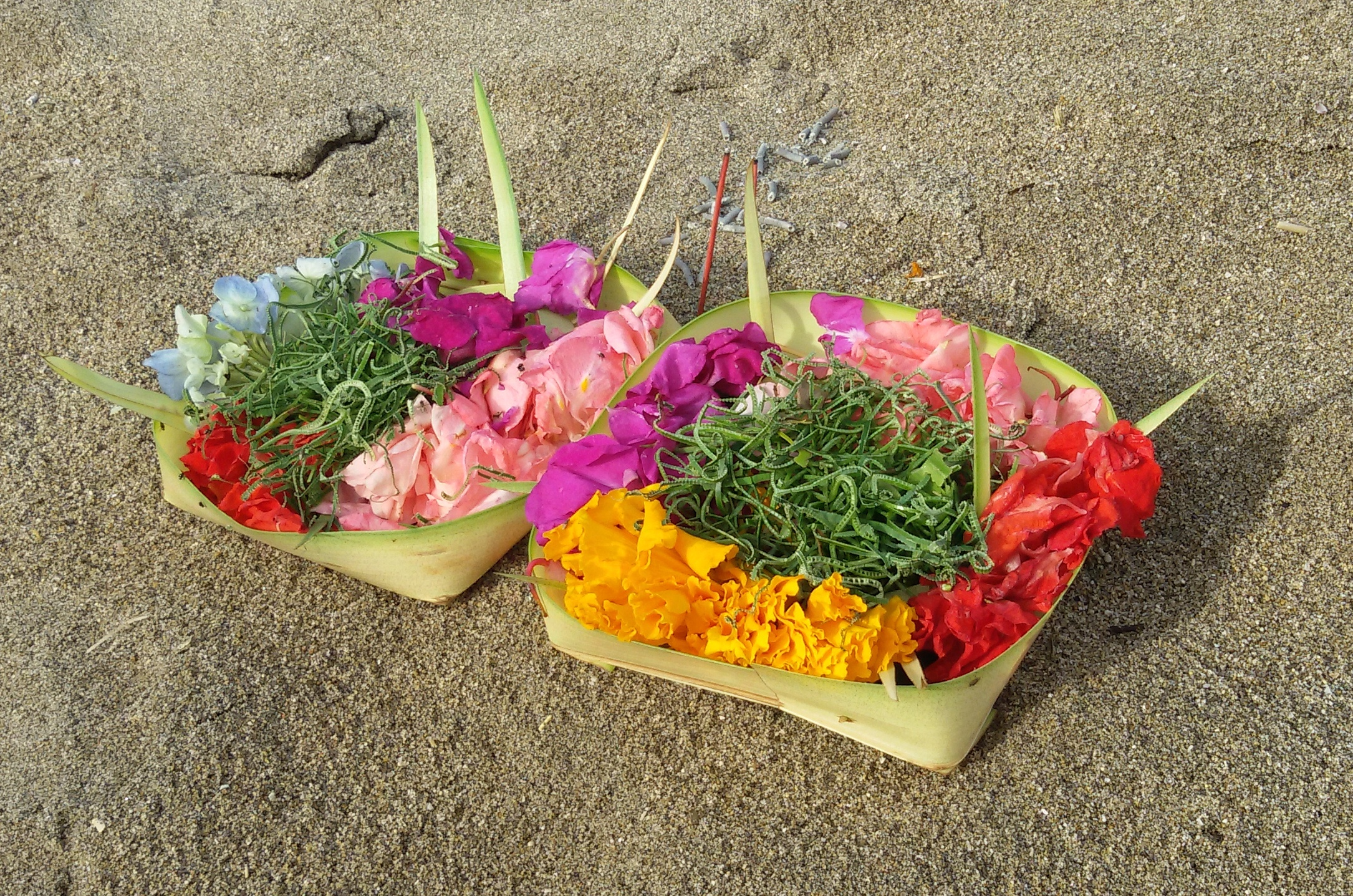
Canang sari at Kuta Beach

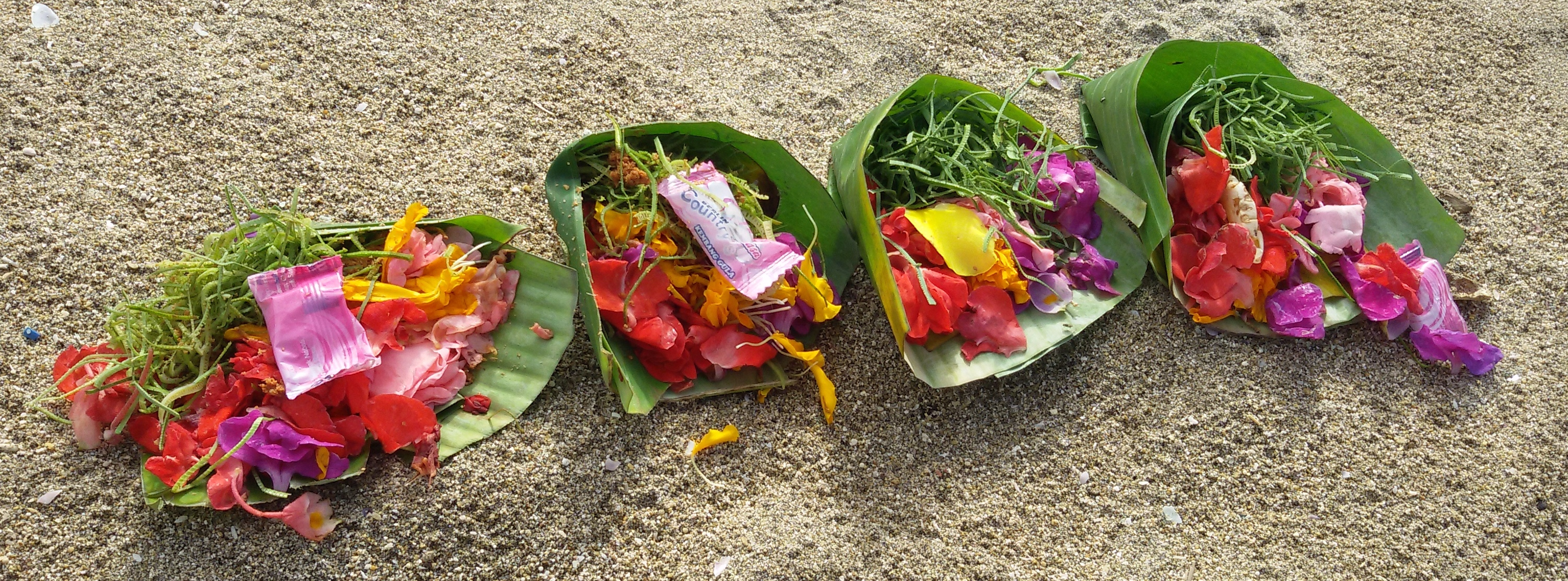
Canang sari at Kuta Beach

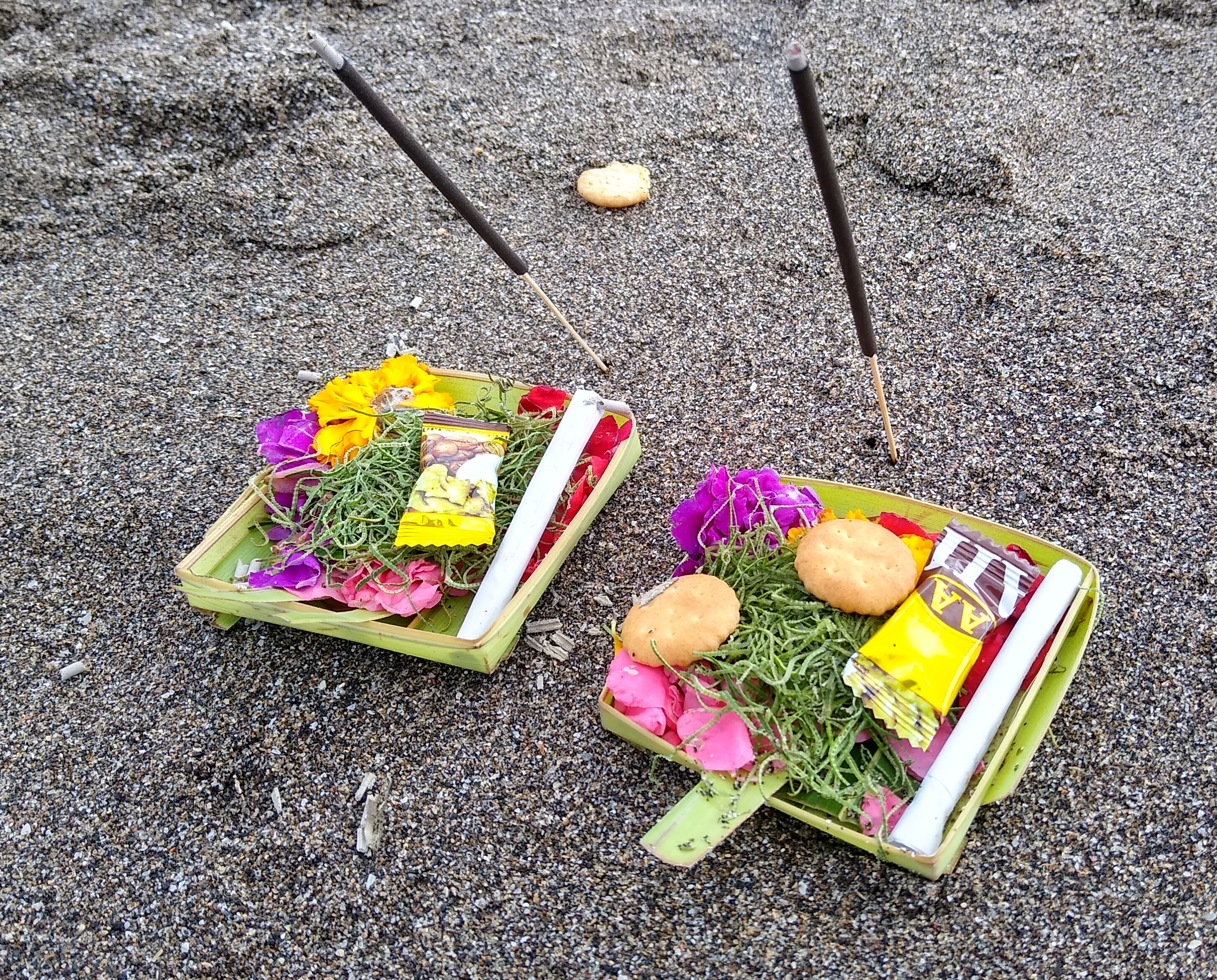
With incense at a beach in Canggu

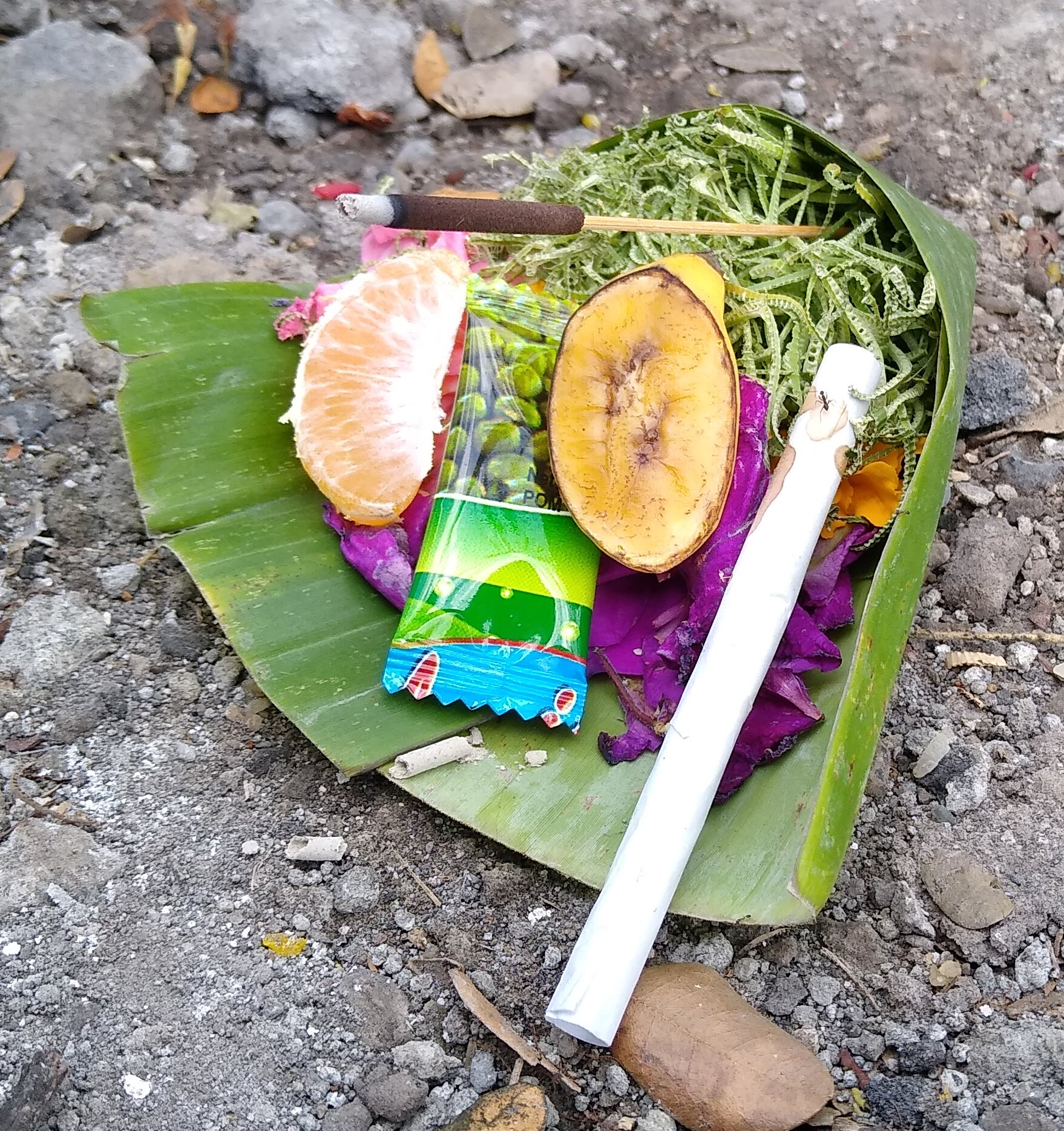
In Canggu

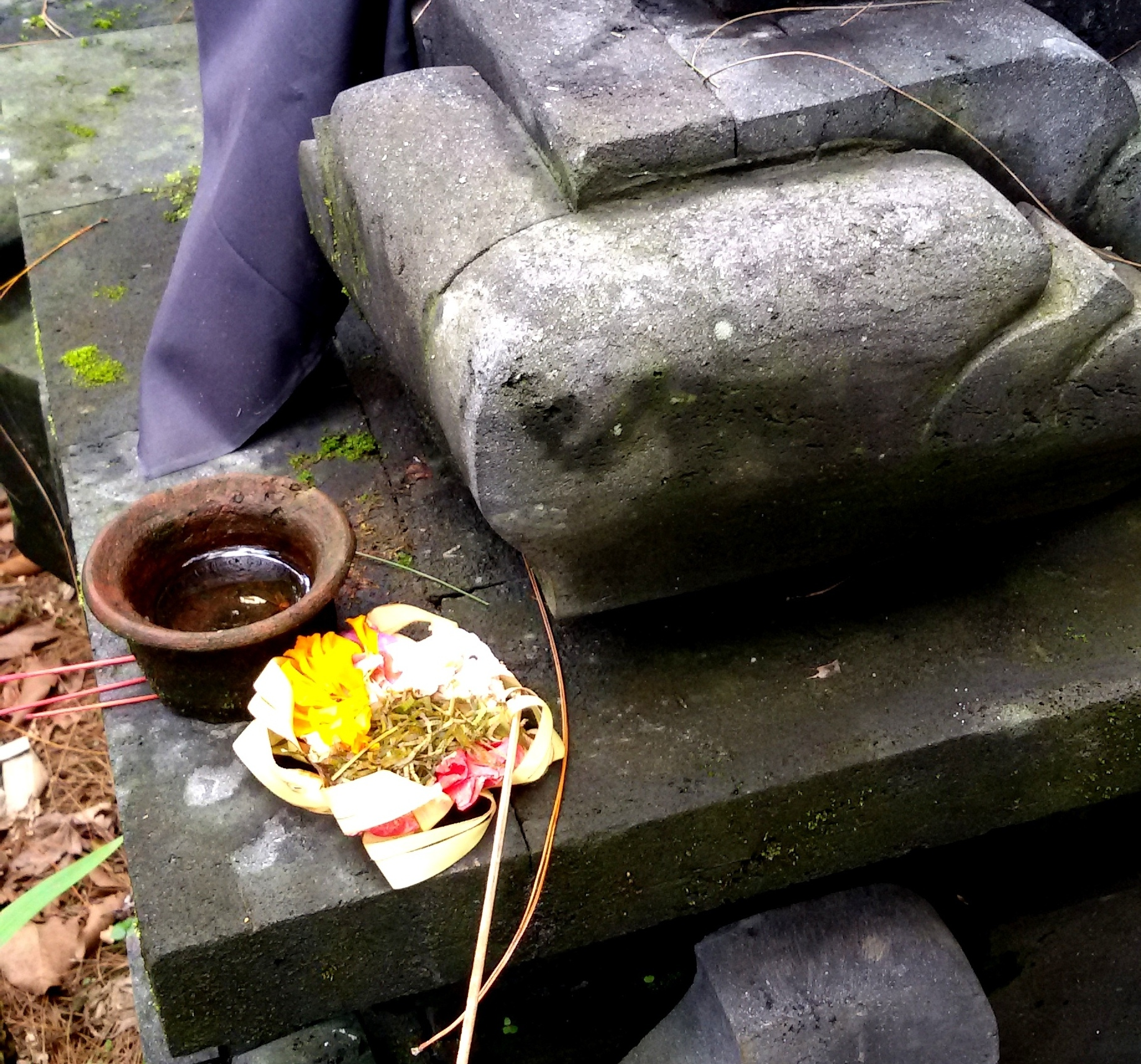
Canang sari at Pura Beji Ananthaboga, Banyuwangi Regency, East Java

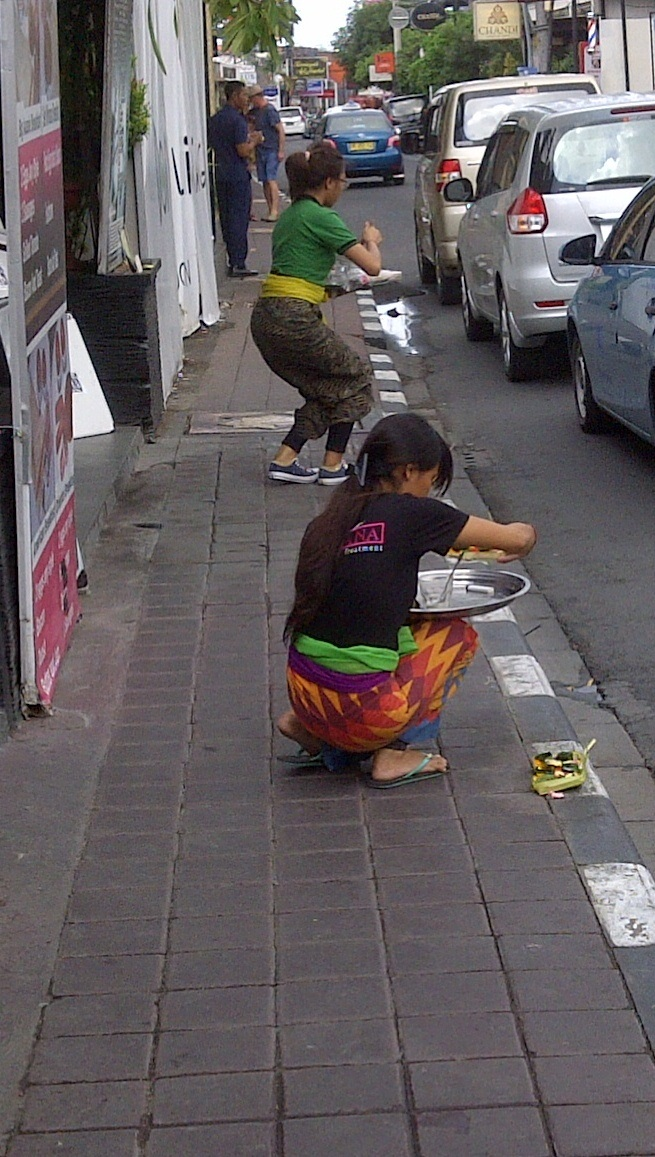
Balinese women attained flower offerings ritual in the morning

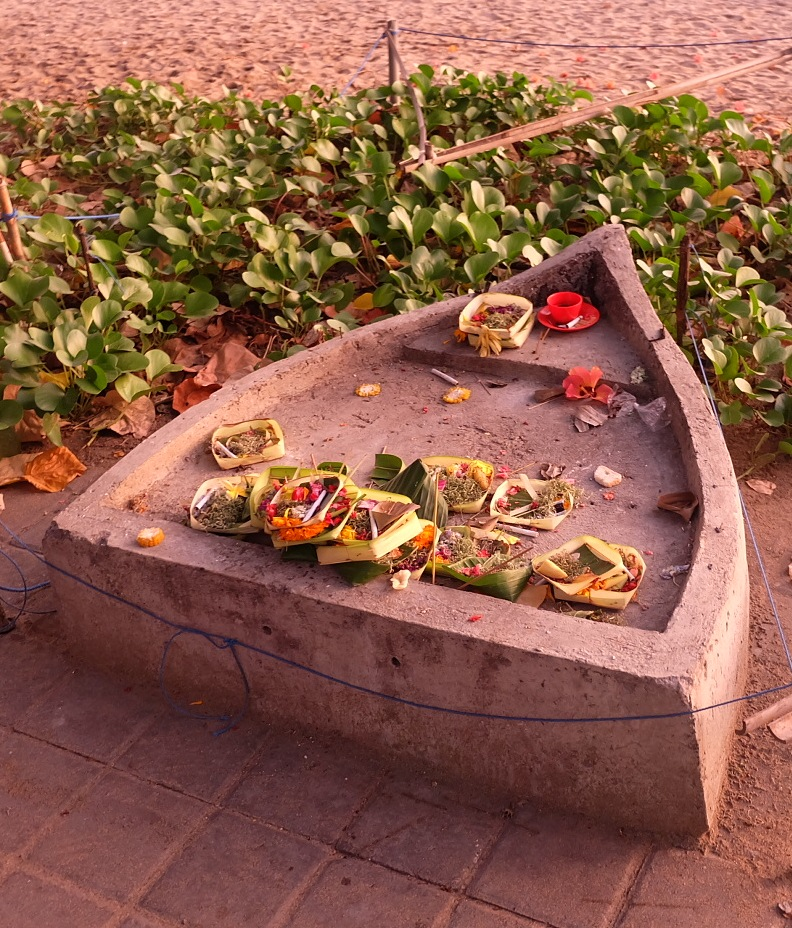
A place to put canang at Kuta, Bali

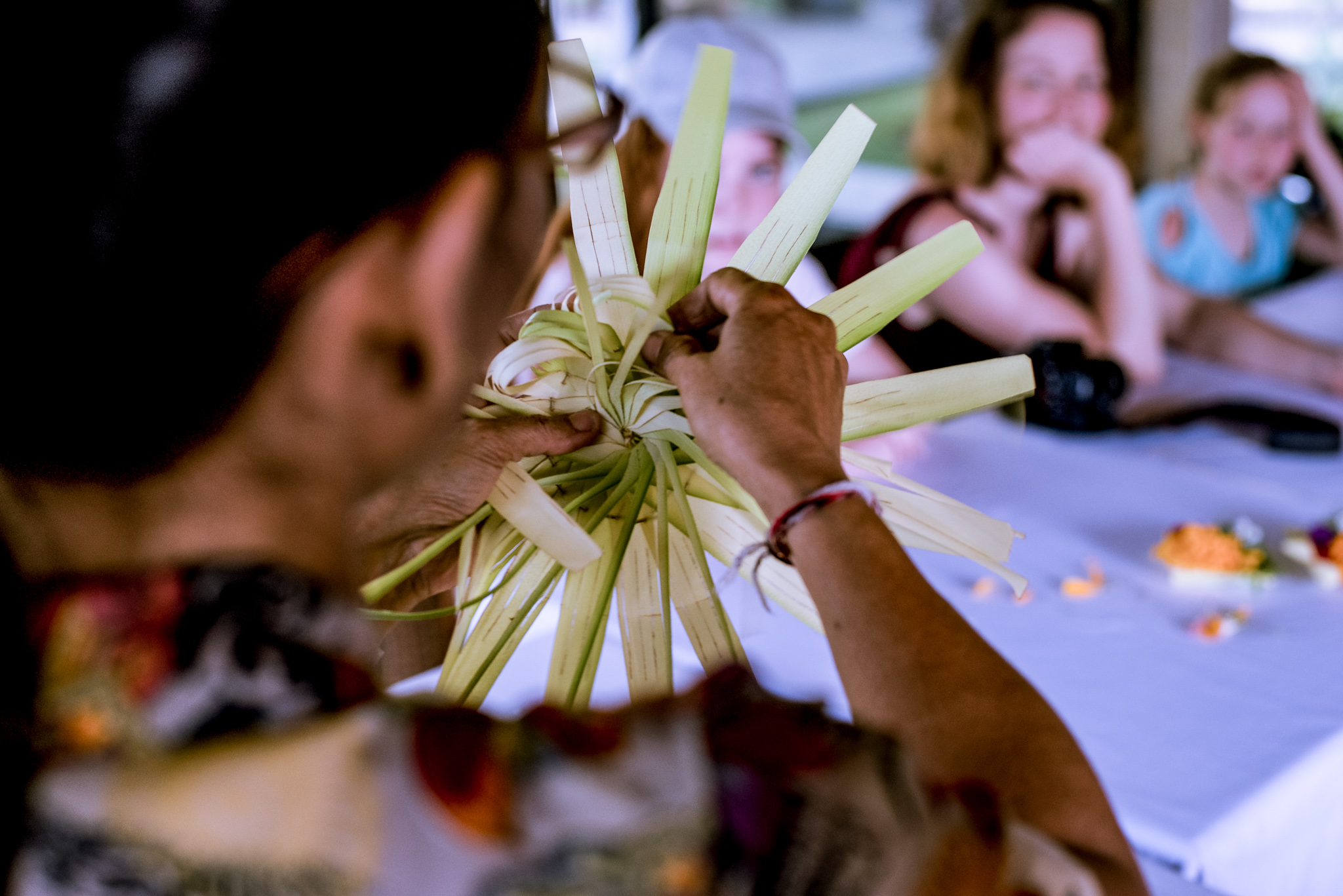
A Balinese woman teaching a class on how to make canang sari offerings.
