= Watu Gunung =

Watu Gunung is a figure in the foundation mythology of the Indonesian island of Java. He is a descendant of the gods, the son of King Palindriya of Gilingwesi and Dewi Sinta. One day, when he is very young, his mother scolds him for troubling her. This upsets him, and he runs away to live in another kingdom. After he grows up, he overthrows the king of that kingdom and takes the throne, but not before the king has cursed him. Not knowing his own parentage, he invades Gilingwesi in order to marry the reputedly beautiful wives of king Palindriya. He then marries his mother, Dewi Sinta, and his aunt/stepmother, Dewi Landep, and has 27 sons by them. The true identity of the incestuous parties is eventually uncovered. Watu Gunung, who is already virtually indestructible because of his godly nature, becomes more and more arrogant, and builds an iron city to live in. The other gods, resenting his pride, go to war with him. In some versions of the myth, he is betrayed by his kinfolk, who tell the enemy about his single vulnerability. Ultimately, peace is secured and Watu Gunung, his wives and children all ascend to heaven. Lessa describes the story as containing elements of Oedipal type.
