= Dewata Nawa Sanga =

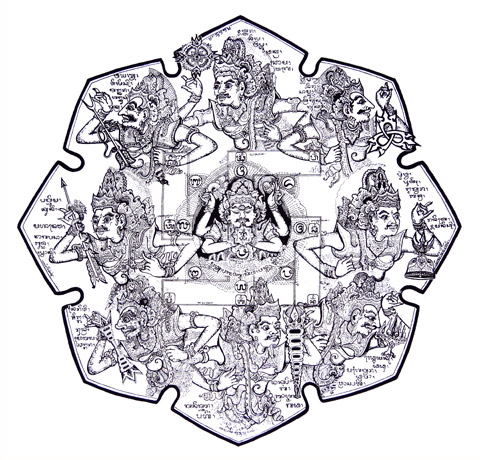
Depiction of the Padma Bhuwana showing the Nawa Sanga deities and their associated celestial weapons in their respective positions.

Dewata Nawa Sanga (Balinese: ᬤᬾᬯᬢ ᬦᬯ ᬲᬗ) is a core cosmological and theological concept in Balinese Hinduism, referring to the nine guardian deities who preside over the eight cardinal and intercardinal directions plus the center of the universe. Together, they are believed to maintain cosmic balance and protect the world from disorder. It is related to the Indian Hindu concept of Aṣṭa-Dikpāla.

The term derives from Sanskrit and Old Javanese elements: dewata (gods), nawa (Sanskrit for nine), and sanga - (Old Javanese for nine). The system integrates Hindu theology with indigenous Balinese spatial cosmology and remains foundational to temple architecture, ritual practice, and sacred geography in Bali.

== Etymology ==
Nawa Sanga comes from two words: nawa, a Sanskrit term meaning “nine,” and sanga, an Old Javanese word with the same meaning. Some scholars instead interpret sanga as sangga, meaning “to support” or “to sustain.” The term dewata refers to divine beings. Taken together, Dewata Nawa Sanga means “the nine sustaining deities.”

== Concept and theology ==
According to the Sundarigama scripture, the nine deities are understood as manifestations of the Supreme God who protect and sustain the universe. Their positions are symbolically arranged in a diagram known as the Padma Bhuwana (“the universal lotus”). The placement of Shiva at the centre of the lotus indicates that this system is grounded in Shaivite philosophy, which has been the dominant Hindu tradition in Bali since the 16th century.

The table below outlines this system: each compass direction is associated with a specific deity and sacred colour. Each deity is also linked to a vehicle (vahana) and a celestial weapon. Temples located in the corresponding directions across Bali are traditionally assigned to these deities.

Deity	Vishnu	Sambhu	Iswara	Maheswara	Brahma	Rudra	Mahadeva	Sangkara	Shiva
Direction	North	North East	East	South East	South	South West	West	North West	Centre
Color	Black	Blue	White	Pink	Red	Orange	Yellow	Green	Five colors
Celestial weapon	Disc (cakra)	Trident (trisula)	Bell (wajra)	Incense (dhupa)	Mace (gada)	Club (mosala)	Serpent Arrow (nagapasa)	Firey arrow (angkusa)	Lotus flower (padma)
Vehicle (vahana)	Garuda	Wilmana	Elephant	Tiger	Swan	Buffalo	Serpent	Lion	Bull
Sacred syllable	ᬅᬁ (A)	ᬯᬁ (Wa)	ᬲᬁ (Sa)	ᬦᬁ (Na)	ᬩᬁ (Ba)	ᬫᬁ (Ma)	ᬢᬁ (Ta)	ᬰᬶᬁ (Si)	ᬇᬁ (I) / ᬬᬁ (Ya)
Place (sthana)	Pura Ulun Danu Batur Pura Batu Madeg Besakih	Pura Besakih	Pura LempuyangLuhur Pura Gelap Besakih	Pura Goa Lawah	Pura Luhur Andakasa Pura Kiduling Kreteg	Pura Luhur Uluwatu	Pura Luhur Batukaru Pura Ulun Kulkul Besakih	Pura Puncak Mangu Pangelengan	Pura Pusering Jagad

== History and origin ==
Surya Majapahit diagram showing the positions and colours of the Balinese Nawa Sanga deities. The names of the original Vedic dpikalaka guardian deities are shown around the outer points of the star.

The concept of nine protective deities first appears in Wrihaspati Tattwa and Sundarigama, two influential Balinese Hindu theological texts dating to the fifteenth century. The Javanese priest Dang Hyang Niratha is credited with introducing the Nawa Sanga system to Bali in the late fifteenth and early sixteenth centuries. The formulation of the Nawa Sanga served as a means of political and religious unification at a time when Bali was divided by competing Hindu sects, following the collapse of the Majapahit Empire and during the rapid spread of Islam across the Indonesian archipelago.

Unlike the asta dikpalaka system—derived from Vedic tradition—which recognises eight directional guardian deities with Brahma at the centre, the Nawa Sanga places Shiva at the centre. In this system, all deities of the Nawa Sanga, with the exception of Vishnu and Brahma, are understood as manifestations of Shiva. This reflects Niratha’s strong Shaivite orientation. The inclusion and spatial positioning of Vishnu, Shiva, and Brahma nevertheless preserved reverence for the Trimurti, which remained a central theological concept in Balinese Hinduism at the time.
