= Indonesian names =

Indonesian names and naming customs reflect the multicultural and multilingual nature of the over 17,000 islands in the Indonesian archipelago. The world's fourth most populous country, Indonesia is home to numerous ethnic groups, each with its own culture, custom, and language.

The naming customs by no means are consistent, and may differ by ethnic group. For example, most western Indonesians do not have surnames (exceptions: Bataks, Nias, Mentawai, Enggano, and some Dayaks), while eastern Indonesians generally do (exceptions: Balinese, West Nusa Tenggara people, and some ethnic groups in Sulawesi).

== Honorifics ==
=== General ===
In Indonesia, ranks and professional titles are used. It is also customary to use Pak, Bapak, or Saudara to address men and Bu, Ibu, or Saudari to address women. Pak and Bapak are literally translated as "father". Bapak is more formal and is used much like the English word, "Mister". Saudara (for men) or Saudari (for women) is another term of greater respect and formality. It translates to "kinsman", "lady", or "gentleman". Ibu is literally translated as "mother". It is used as "madam" or "Ms." would be in English. If addressing a man whose name is unknown, one uses Bapak and if addressing a woman whose name is unknown, one uses Ibu.

A very formal way to address an older person or a person of higher status is Tuan or Nyonya, which mean "mister" or "madam".

An informal way to address a significantly older person is to use Om, Paman, Bibi, or Tante, which mean "uncle" and "aunt". The terms are Dutch-influenced and quite commonly used in the big cities.

Local honorifics continue to be employed throughout Indonesia. In a casual situation, Kakak or Kak is used to address a person as an "older sibling".

In Javanese, Mbak is used for "older sister" and Mas is used for "older brother". Mbak and Mas are also used, for example, to address junior staff in cafes and restaurants in Jakarta.

In Sundanese, Teteh or Teh is used for "older sister" and Akang, Kang, or Aa is used for "older brother". Mamang, Amang, or Mang is used for "uncle" and Ceuceu or Ceu is used for "aunt".

In Balinese, Mbok is used for "older sister" and Bli is used for "older brother". Geg is used for "younger sister" and Gus is used for "younger brother".

In Batak, Ito is used by a woman to a man or vice versa to call "older sibling", Eda is used by a woman to call "older sister", and Lae is used by man to call "older brother".

In Minangkabau, Uni is used for "older sister" and Uda is used for "older brother".

In Manado, Ambon, and Kupang, Nona is used for "younger sister" and Nyong is used for "younger brother". Noni is also used for "younger sister" in Manado.

In Papua, Tete is used for elderly men and Nene is used for elderly women. Bapa is used for older men and Mama is used for older women. Pace is used for familiar older men and Mace is used for familiar older women. Kaka is used for "older sibling". Ade is used for "younger sibling". Nona is used for familiar women of your age or young women.

In Malay cultural spheres, an "older sister" is addressed as Kakak or Kak and an "older brother" is addressed as Abang or Bang. However, Abang is also commonly used in other areas to address a becak driver, angkot driver, butcher, vegetable vendor, fishmonger, or hawker.

Gus (from bagus) is used exclusively to address an honorable Eastern Javanese person with a strong traditional and religious identity. For example, the Indonesian former president, Abdurrahman Wahid, was often addressed as Gus Dur; Dur being the short form of his first name, Abdurrahman. Single names are some of the most common around Indonesia .

=== Royalty ===
For Indonesian royalty, the titles "Sri" and "Prabhu" are used to address kings and monarchs, usually in Indianized kingdoms located in the islands of Sumatra, Java, Bali, Borneo, and other places which had Hindu/Buddhist influence. "Sri Baginda" or "Sri Paduka Baginda" is the formal title used to address a king, for example the sultan of Yogyakarta, Sri Sultan Hamengkubuwono X. "Prabhu" is also the title used for kings who ruled in the Hindu/Buddhist era, such as Prabu Siliwangi and Prabu Bratasena.

== Naming forms ==
Legally, Indonesian personal names are not divided into first and family names. A single name can be recognized as a full personal name, and the addition of further components—such as additional given names, regional, or ethnic family/clan names or patronymics or matronymics—is a matter of parents' choice when registering the child's name. Even then, family names or patronymics are just considered part of the full personal name and have no official relevance (for instance, alphabetic ordering of names is always done by the first letter of the full personal name).

The majority of Indonesians do not have family names. Rather, their given names are geographically and culturally specific. Names beginning with "Su" in Indonesian spelling ("Soe" in the old orthography) or ending with an "o" are usually Javanese people. For example, people called "Suprapto" or "Soeprapto" are likely to be of Javanese descent.

Malays of northeast Sumatra such as in Medan have a unique naming convention based on the order of their birth:

- the eldest born is Sulung
- the second (tengah, 'middle') is Ongah
- the youngest is Bungsu.

Balinese names are given similarly; Wayan means first born, Made means second born. A Balinese name may also indicate caste- for instance, a Kshatriya person may be named "I Gusti".

"Sitompul" and "Rajagukguk" are clan names usually found in people with Batak or North Sumatran heritage.

In general, Indonesian names fall into one of the following categories:

- A single name, such as Sukarno and Suharto
- Two (or more) names without a family name, such as Joko Widodo or Sri Mulyani Indrawati
- Two (or more) names with a family/clan name such as Alexander Evert Kawilarang, Abdul Hakim Achmad Aituarauw or Abdul Haris Nasution
- Two (or more) names with a patronymic, such as Megawati Sukarnoputri or Abdurrahman Wahid

== Regulation ==
The Ministry of Home Affairs of the Republic of Indonesia Regulation no. 73 of 2022 about Recording of Names on Residence Document regulates the naming of Indonesian residents. The document requires names to be written in the Latin script, and having no less than two words and no more than 60 characters, including spaces. It also discourages names that contain multiple meanings or negative meanings.

Before the regulation was introduced, there had been people with unusual names like 6 people with names with only a single character, including "." and "N", while on the other side, there were also people with extremely long names like "Rangga Madhipa Sutra Jiwa Cordosega Akre Askhala Mughal Ilkhanat Akbar Suhara Pi-Thariq Ziyad Syaifudin Quthuz Khoshala Sura Talenta", which contained up to 132 characters including spaces. In September 2025, Ministry of Home Affairs revealed that three people below have the longest names in Indonesia, and all of them were born before the regulation was enacted.

- Shinggudinggazhanggaree Jaudingginaderaenivatearathus Mauradhuttamazhazhilazu'art (78 characters)
- Engkang Sinuhun Kanjeng Pangeran Gagak Handoko Hadiningrat Putro Sabdo Langit (68 characters)
- Crescentia Fransisca Theresia Johanna Widyarsari Puspa Caesarianti (60 characters)

== Indonesian naming traditions ==
Most Indonesians do not have family names. Both men and women usually have a given name and then take the name of their father as a last name. Some, but not all, married Indonesian women take the last name of their husband. This name is usually added after their own "last" name. Therefore, it is not rare for married couples to have different last or family names.

Naming also differs regionally. Some Javanese, especially those of the old generation have only one name. Bataks have clan names which are used as their surnames. Some Chinese Indonesians have Chinese-style names. In Indonesian telephone directories, names are listed under the first or given name and not under the last or family name.

=== Mononymic names ===
Example:

Child's name: Hasan
Father's name: Suparman
Mother's name: Wulandari

On the birth certificate, the child's name would be written as "Hasan child of Suparman and Wulandari". The birth certificate of an extramarital child would bear only the mother's name. On a school diploma, the child's name would be written as "Hasan, child of Suparman". On all other official documents (ID card, driver's license, and passport), only the child's name would appear, "Hasan".

=== Polynymic names without a family name ===
Example:

Child's name: Hasan Prasetyo
Father's name: Suparman Prakoso
Mother's name: Wulandari Setiadewi

On the birth certificate, the child's name would be written as "Hasan Prasetyo child of Suparman Prakoso and Wulandari Setiadewi". On all other official documents, the child's name would be written as "Hasan Prasetyo".

=== Polynymic names with family name ===
If the parents want a family name (or surname) to appear on official documents, the family name has to be included on the child's birth certificate.

Example:

Child's name: Hasan Prakoso
Father's name: Suparman Prakoso
Mother's name: Wulandari Suprapto

On the birth certificate, the child's name would be written as "Hasan Prakoso child of Suparman Prakoso and Wulandari Suprapto". On all other official documents, the child's name would be written as "Hasan Prakoso".

=== Polynymic names with patronymic ===
The patronymic is usually constructed from the father's name, with the word putra (for males, "son" in Sanskrit) or putri (for females, "daughter" in Sanskrit) appended.

Example:

Child's name: Hasan Suparmanputra
Father's name: Suparman
Mother's name: Wulandari

On the birth certificate, the child's name would be written as "Hasan Suparmanputra child of Suparman and Wulandari". On all other official documents, the child's name would be written as "Hasan Suparmanputra". This would be somewhat analogous to the practice in Iceland, where patronymics are used.

Occasionally, the father's name will be used as the surname, without appending putra or putri (in this example it would be Hasan Suparman). This might be done unofficially, that is, not matching the birth certificate. Nevertheless, this format sometimes appears on government documents.

== Modifications to the name outside of Indonesia ==
Other countries may modify an official Indonesian name to conform to local standards. This is most apparent in states throughout the world where personal names are divided by law into given/first name and family/last name.

In the Netherlands, for example, a person without an official family name would be given the surname Onbekend (which means "unknown"). Individuals with multiple-word names will often be given this surname, particularly if the last name on the birth certificate differs from the father's family name. Individuals with a distinct family name may also be given this surname if it is recorded differently on the birth certificate.

Referring to the examples above, a Dutch identification card would record the individual's name as:

Example 1: Hasan Onbekend
Example 2: Hasan Prasetyo Onbekend
Example 3: Hasan Gunawan Onbekend
Example 4: Hasan Suparmanputra Onbekend

In Germany, the one-word name is used as both given name and surname. This is often displayed on official documents as "Hasan Hasan" or "H. Hasan".

In the U.S., there are at least four ways to record people with a single-word name. One way is to use the existing single word name as the surname. Then, an official body will add "FNU" (first name unknown) as the first or given name. This can lead to a false belief that "Fnu" is a common Indonesian first name.

Conversely, the existing single word name can be used as the given or first name and then "LNU" (last name unknown) may be added as the family, surname or last name. This can lead to the misconception that "Lnu" is a common Indonesian surname. In some cases "Fnu" will be used as the surname or last name.

Third, the existing single word name may be duplicated to give a first name and surname such as "Hasan Hasan".

Fourth, the practice of the U.S. Patent and Trademark Office is to record the single-word name as a first or given name, and to enter a period for the surname.

== Origin of names in Indonesia ==
=== Local family/clan names ===
There are some Indonesian ethnic groups or tribes whose people do maintain a family, last, or surname. These include the:

- Alas people of Aceh, for example, Desky, Keruas, Kepale Dese, or Pagan.
- Gayo people of Aceh, for example, Alga, Ariga, Bukit, Cibero, Gading, Gunung, Linge, Munte, or Tebe.
- Kluet people of Aceh, for example, Bencawan, Pinem, Pelis, or Selian.
- Batak people of Sumatra, for example, Hutabarat, Nainggolan, Panjaitan, Simatupang, or Siregar.
- Nias people from Nias, for example, Amuata, Falakhi, Laoly, Marunduri, Ote, or Wau.
- Minangkabau people of Sumatra, for example, Bodi, Caniago, Sikumbang, Koto, Tanjung, or Piliang.
- Mentawai people from Mentawai Islands, for example, Anakalang, Sabaggalet, Gougou, Oinan, Sagurung, or Talopulei.
- Komering people of South Sumatra, for example, Bungamayang, Pakusengkunyit, or Semendawai.
- Tribes and royalties in Lampung, for example, Djayasinga, Badak, Limau, Gunungalip, or Way Tube.
- Christian Betawi people, for example, Baidan, Djaim, or Senen.
- Royalties and nobles from the Javanese people, for example, Sastrowardoyo, Djojohadikusumo, or Kolopaking.
- Royalties and nobles from the Sundanese people or Bantenese of Java, for example, Kusumah, Djajadiningrat, Soerjaatmadja, Martadinata, or Prawiranegara.
- Dayak people of Kalimantan, for example, Udan Tingang, Unus, Apui, Usat, Laing, Lawai, Danum, Riwut, Usop, Narang, Undjung, Ngampar, Gohong, Baboe, Huang, Lambung, Djinu, Ningkan, or Jau.
- Toraja people from Tana Toraja for example, Allokendek, Toding, Lumba, Rambulangi, or Manganan.
- Rampi people from North Luwu, for example Dasinga, Sigi, Ntaba, Sinta, Kaho, or Gerosi.
- Minahasan people from North Sulawesi, for example, Lembong, Mogot, Ratulangi, Sondakh, or Tendean.
- Mongondow people from Bolaang Mongondow, for example, Damopolii, Mokoginta, Mokodongan, Manoppo, Mokodompit, or Pasambuna.
- Sangir people from Sangihe Islands, for example, Kansil, Manansang, Manganang, Mohede, or Tatengkeng.
- Talaud people from Talaud Islands, for example, Ambanaga, Binambuni, Darinding, Gumansalangi, Lalombuida, Ratungalo, or Totopandey.
- Gorontalo people from Gorontalo, for example, Gobel, Hulupango, Lasindrang, Kamaru, Pomanto, or Monoarfa.
- Various ethnic groups in the Maluku Islands, for example, Leiwakabessy, Latuconsina, Hehanussa, Ilela, Mahu, Marasabessy, Umasangadji, Fatotnam, Wailissa, Renyaan, Marsaoly, Ringirfuryaan, Sahanaya, or Sahilatua. Due to intermixing, many Moluccans also retain foreign surnames from foreign countries such as the Netherlands (van Afflen, van Room, de Wanna, de Kock, Kniesmeijer, Gaspersz, Ramschie, Payer, Ziljstra, van der Weden, etc.), Portugal (da Costa, de Fretes, Que, Carliano, de Souza, se Carvalho, Pareira, Courbois, Frandescolli, etc.), Spain (Oliviera, Diaz, de Jesus, Silvera, Rodriguez, Montefalcon, Mendoza, de Lopez, etc.), and Arabic directly from Hadramaut (Al-Kaff, Al-Chatib, Bachmid, Bafagih, Bakhwereez, Bahasoan, Al-Qadri, Alaydrus, Assegaff, etc.)
- Various ethnic groups in East Nusa Tenggara use surnames native to the region—some of these surnames include Hurek, Riberu, Seda, Messakh, and Keraf. There are also Portuguese surnames (typically found in the eastern portion of Flores) due to Portuguese influence in the region during colonial times, such as Fernandez, Diaz, Pareira, Da Lopez, da Cunha, de Rosario, and others.
- Various ethnic groups in West Papua—There are more than 200 ethnic groups in West Papua, and surnames are typically unique to a particular ethnic group and can be used to identify a person's ethnic background. Some of the largest surnames include Kogoya, Wenda, Tabuni, Wonda, and Murib from Highland Papua and Central Papua. There are also other West Papuan surnames popular in Indonesia such as Rumberpon, Suebu, Kaisiepo, Numberi, and Solossa.

=== Javanese names ===
Javanese people have various systems for naming. Some Javanese, especially those from older generations, have only one name and no surname. Others use their father's names as well as their own, in a similar manner to European patronymics. For example, Abdurrahman Wahid's name is derived from Wahid Hasyim, his father, an independence fighter and minister. In turn, Wahid Hasyim's name was derived from his father named Hasyim Asyari, a cleric and founder of the Nahdlatul Ulama organization. Another example is former President Megawati Sukarnoputri; the last part of the name is a patronymic, meaning "Sukarno's daughter".

Some Javanese, especially those from older generations, have a mononymic name and no family name; for example, Sukarno, Suharto, and Boediono. Some names are derived from native Javanese language, while some others are derived from Sanskrit and Arabic. Names with the prefix Su-, which means good, are very popular.

=== Sanskrit-derived names ===
Most Indonesians, especially the Javanese, Sundanese, and Balinese, have names derived from Sanskrit. This is because of the Indian cultural influence which came to the archipelago since thousands of years ago during the Indianization of South East Asian kingdoms, and ever since, it is seen as part of the Indonesian culture, especially Sundanese, Javanese, Balinese, and some part of Sumatran culture. Unlike Sanskrit-derived names in Thai and Khmer, the pronunciation of such names in either Javanese or Indonesian is very similar to the original Indian pronunciation, except that the v is changed to a w, and all instances of s, ś, and ṣ are merged into single s.

For example, Susilo Bambang Yudhoyono, former Indonesian president, has a Sanskrit-derived name. "Susilo" comes from sushila meaning "good character" and "Yudhoyono" comes from yudha meaning war or battle and yana meaning an epic story. Sukarno is derived from the Sanskrit su (good) and karno or Karna (a warrior) in Mahabharata.

Several common Indonesian names derived from Sanskrit are deities or heroes names, including Indra, Krisna, Wisnu, Surya, Bayu, Dewa, Rama, Lesmana, Sudarto (Javanese for Siddharta), Dewi, Pertiwi, Sri, Ratih, Sinta, Laksmi, and Saraswati. Some famous people who uses these names include: Giring Ganesha, Isyana Sarasvati, Indra Lesmana, Dewa Budjana, Dewi Sandra, Laksamana Sukardi, etc..

Other Sanskrit derived names used widely in Indonesia also include such as: Wibisana or Wibisono (from the Ramayana figure Vibhishana), Arya, Subrata, Aditya, Abimanyu, Bima, Sena, Satya, Cakra (read Chakra), Putri, Putra, Mahardhika, Gatot or Gatut (from the Mahabharata figure Ghatotkacha), Perdana (from the word "Pradhan"), Prameswara or Prameswari, Wijaya (from Vijay), and many more.

Many Indonesians use Sanskrit-derived names to indicate their position among siblings (birth order). The first-born child might bear the name Eka or Eko (mostly Javanese), the second-born child might be named Dwi, the third-born Tri, the fourth-born Catur, and the fifth-born Panca or Ponco (usually Javanese). Some examples are Eko Yuli Irawan, Rizky Dwi Ramadhana, Triyaningsih, and Catur Pamungkas.

Indonesian government names of institutions, mottoes, and other terms also use Sanskrit, such as to address an Indonesian Navy admiral, the word "Laksamana" (from the Ramayan figure Lakshmana) is used. The "Adipura award" (Indonesian: Penghargaan Adipura) which is an award given to cities throughout Indonesia from the central government for cleanliness and urban environmental management also uses from Sanskrit language which is Adi and Pura. There are also many mottoes of Indonesian institutions which use Sanskrit language, such as the motto of the Indonesian Military Academy which sounds "Adhitakarya Mahatvavirya Nagarabhakti".

Some of these Sanskrit-derived names might be used by ningrat or menak (noble) families, especially among Javanese and Sundanese, in much the same way as some family names in western culture indicate lineage and nobility. Some such names are Jayadiningrat, Adiningrat, Notonegoro, Suryasumantri, Dharmokusumo, Wongsoatmodjo, Natalegawa, Kusumaatmadja, Kartadibrata, Kartapranata, and Kartasasmita.

=== Chinese names ===
Under President Suharto, Indonesia attempted to deconstruct organisations and groups that might represent an internal security threat. As a part of the policy to limit the influence of the Chinese Communists and to encourage the ethnic Chinese to assimilate, the state strongly encouraged Chinese Indonesian individuals to change their names. This was a difficult balance because while the names were changed, laws continued to identify them as 'different' from indigenous Indonesian groups. Indonesian businessman, Liem Sioe Liong, for example, had his name changed to Sudono Salim. Some people did not change their names (e.g., Kwik Kian Gie, Liem Swie King, etc.).

Many of the later generations have kept the Indonesian form of the name. Other Chinese Indonesians, however, maintain their Chinese name as well as their family names. As is customary with Chinese names, the family name (or surname) is traditionally placed in front of the given (or first) name.

=== Arabic names ===
As Islam is the largest religion in Indonesia, it is quite common to find Arabic first names or words. Popular Arabic names include Muhammad, Ahmad, Arief, Akbar, Reza, Aisyah, Nur, Nabila and Zahra. Such names are used by Indonesians not of Arab descent, both as first names and as surnames.

Ethnic groups with strong Islamic influence, such as the Acehnese, Malay, Minangkabau, Betawi and Bugis, tend to use Arabic names. For example, Indonesian politicians Teuku Muhammad Hasan (from Aceh) and Mohammad Hatta (from Minangkabau) have Arabic names. However, some of these ethnic groups with strong Islamic influences, such as the Betawi people, have Arabic names which have been suitable with the local pronunciation, such as Leman (Sulaiman), Rojak (Razak), etc.

Arabs settled in Indonesia many generations ago, and their descendants still use their family names, for example, Assegaf, Alhabsyi, or Shihab.

There are many Javanese-style Arabic names such as "Kanapi" (from Hanafi), "Marpuah" (from Marfu'ah), "Ngabdurohman" (from Abdurrahman), "Sarip" (from Sharif), "Slamet" (from Salamah), "Solikin" (from Salihin), etc.

The name "Maysaroh" is a common female name amongst the Betawi people. However, this name is actually a male name in Arab countries. It is probably mistaken with the name Saroh, which is in turn derived from Sarah.

There are also people in Indonesia who were named after classical scholars of Islam, such as "Ghozali" (from Al-Ghazali), "Romli" (from Shihab al-Din al-Ramli) or "Syafi'i" (from Al-Shafi'i).

=== Western names ===
Western names were brought to Indonesia by the Spanish, Portuguese, Dutch, and later from American-English cultural exports. Names with western origin include Henry, Agus, Johan, Andri, Anto (Antonius), Siska, Roni, Jono, Riska, Suzanna, Rian, Markus, and many more.

Indonesian Christians (Protestants and Catholics) may use Christian first names and/or baptismal names, derived more or less directly from Latin, such as Yohanes, Andreas, Matius, Markus, Lukas, Paulus, Maria, Stefanus, Yakobus, Filipus, and many more Biblical names. These names have been Indonesianized to conform with the Indonesian pronunciations (or as they appear in the Indonesian Bible translations). But more recently, many parents also use Anglicised names such as Peter, Andrew, James, John, Paul, Eva, Stephanie, Mary, etc.. Many non-Christian Indonesians may also use Western names such as Jon, Sam, Paul, Brian, Toni, Tomi, Anne, or Yulia. Many female names are also suffixed with either -ina and -ita, both are diminutive suffixes in Spanish.

Combinations of names from different origins such as "Ricky Hidayat" (Western-Arabic) are to be found as well.

=== Names related to month of birth ===
Indonesian names may indicate the month of birth. For example,

- January: Januri (m), Yanuar (m). Example: Yanuar Tri Firmanda.
- February: usually identified from prefix Febr-. Example: Febriyanto Wijaya.
- March: Marti (derived from Maret, Indonesian word for March, which in turn is derived from Dutch Maart). Example: Marty Natalegawa.
- April: usually identified from prefix Apri- or Afri-. Example: Aprilia Yuswandari.
- May: Mei or its derivations such as Meilanie, Meiliana, Meiliani (all are feminine). Example: Meiliana Jauhari.
- June: Yuni (f) or its derivations such as Yuniar (f), Yuniarti (f), Yuniarto (m). Example: Yuni Shara.
- July: usually identified from prefix Juli- or Yuli-. Example: Alvent Yulianto.
- August: Agus (m) (actually a name of native origin) or its derivations such as Agustin (m), Agustina (f), Agustinus (m, usually borne by Indonesian Catholic). Example: Agus Ngaimin.
- September: usually identified from prefix Sept- or Seft-. Example: Seftia Hadi.
- October: usually identified from prefix Oct- or Okt-. Example: Yati Octavia.
- November: usually identified from prefix Nov-. Example: Novita Dewi.
- December: Deasy, Desi, Dessy (all are feminine). Example: Desi Anwar.

=== Patrilineal and matrilineal family names ===
Some Indonesian patronymic last names are constructed of the father's name, with the word putra (for male) or putri (for female) appended. One example is former Indonesian President Megawati Sukarnoputri, the daughter of former President Sukarno. However, it is also common for the father's name alone to form the child's last name (for instance, 'Ali Ahmad' from the father 'Ahmad Sudharma').

Located in Western Sumatra, the Minangkabau are the largest matrilineal culture in the world and the fourth largest ethnic group in Indonesia. Tribe, clan (or suku) titles, properties and names are all handed down through the female line.

=== Names with religious connotations ===
Other than the above linguistical sources, Indonesians also gave their children names from their religious background, irrelevant with their mother language or source language of those names. Hindu names typically includes some deity names, and Sanskrit in origin, while Muslim names usually contain some variation of "Muhammad" and other Arabic names (with no apparent consensus on transliteration rule), and Christian names are either borrowed from European languages, or assimilated from them into Indonesian spellings (e.g. Christian -> Kristian). There are some similarities between the Indonesian Christian and Muslim names such as names that can be found in both Abrahamic religions like Adam, Abraham/Ibrahim, Yusuf/Yusup, Harun, Salomo/Sulaiman, Yunus, Ayub.

It is noteworthy that names based on religious connotations sometimes doesn't necessarily means that the person (or their parents) adherents of said religion, such as Christians/Muslims with Hindu names (e.g. Wisnu, a common male name, Giring Ganesha, etc.), Muslims/Hindu/Buddhist with Christian sounding names (e.g. Kristiani Herrawati), or Buddhist/Hindu/Christian with Muslim/Arabic names (e.g. Sulaiman, Hassan, and other common Arabic names), as many Javanese (and Indonesians to a larger degree) took inspirations from various cultural sources. Some names even mix elements from different religious sources, such as "Wisnu Kristianto" (Wisnu from Vishnu, and Kristianto from Christian), "Muhammad Wisnu", etc. which makes them truly unique from anthropological's point of view. This naming system is especially prevalent from people living in metropolitan areas, or people with Javanese background, as Javanese names tend to be more liberal, while less prevalent in other cultures and regions where the majority of the people are still using traditional names and naming system, or where religion still play a very large emphasis on the daily lives.

== Nicknames ==
It is uncommon, and considered rude, to refer to an Indonesian person by their full first name, unless that name has only one or two syllables. Former Indonesian president Abdurrahman Wahid, for example, had "Abdurrahman" shortened to "Dur". Many Indonesians use a different name altogether; a woman born as "Khadijah" may be known as "Ida" or "Ijah" to all her friends and family.

In Sundanese culture it is common for the nickname to become integrated as the first name. For example, someone with the name "Komariah", "Gunawan", or "Suryana" written in their birth certificate may become known as "Kokom" for Komariah, "Gugun", or "Wawan" for Gunawan, and "Yaya" or "Nana" for Suryana. The result is rhyming names such as "Kokom Komariah", "Wawan Gunawan", and "Nana Suryana". Notable people having such names include politician Agum Gumelar, comedian Entis Sutisna (with stage name Sule), and politician Dedi Mulyadi.

Indonesian people might also take a English nicknames such as Kevin, Kenny, Tommy (Tomi), Jimmy, Ricky, Dicky, Bob, Nicky, Nico, Susy, Taty, Lucy (Lusi), Nancy, Mary (Maria) and so on. It does not necessarily mean their names are Thomas (for Tommy) or James (for Jimmy). For instance, Suharto's son, Hutomo Mandalaputra is popularly known as "Tommy Suharto". The "Tommy" here was not derived from "Thomas", but from the Javanese name, "Hutomo".

== Noble titles as part of personal name ==
In some ethnic groups it is common to include a nobility title into the formal personal name. Due to the various traditions of nobility in each ethnic group, it may be difficult for people from outside a particular ethnic group to discern the nobility title from the personal name.

Acehnese people have titles such as Teuku or Teungku (male) and Cut (female). Celebrities with such titles include, for example, Teuku Wisnu and Cut Tari.

Balinese people have titles based on castes such as Ida Bagus for male and Ida Ayu for female (Brahmana caste), I Dewa, I Dewa Ayu, I Gusti, I Gusti Ayu, Ida I Dewa Agung, Cokorda/Tjokorda, and Anak Agung (Ksatriya caste), and Ngakan, Kompyang, and Sang (Waisya caste).

Banjar people have titles such as Andin, Antung, and Anang (male) and Gusti and Galuh (female).

Bantenese people have titles such as Tubagus (male) and Ratu (female). People with such titles include, for example, Tubagus Hasanuddin and Ratu Atut Chosiyah.

Belitung people have titles such as Ki Agus (male) and Nyi Ayu (female).

Buginese people and Makassarese people have 13 titles such as Andi, Petta, Datu, Bau, Daeng, Karaeng, Kare, Puang, Arung, Iye, La/I, Opu, and Sombaya. People with such titles include, for example, Andi Mappanyukki and Karaeng Matoaya.

Butonese people have titles such as La (male) and Wa (female). People with such titles include, for example, La Nyalla Mattalitti and Wa Ode Nurhayati.

Javanese people have titles such as Raden Mas, Raden, and Mas (male), Raden Ayu, Raden Nganten, and Mas Ayu (married female), and Raden Ajeng, Raden Rara, and Mas Ajeng (unmarried female).

Malay people have titles such as Tengku (male and female) and Datuk (male).

Minangkabau people have titles such as Datuak, Sutan, and Marah for male. People with such titles include, for example Sutan Sjahrir and Marah Roesli.

Palembang people have titles such as Raden Mas, Masagus, Kemas, and Kiagus (male) and Raden Ayu, Masayu, Nyimas, and Nyayu (female).

Sasak people have titles such as Lalu (male) and Baiq (female). People with such titles include, for example, Lalu Muhammad Zohri and Baiq Lukita Kirana Putri.

Sumba people have titles such as Umbu (male) and Rambu (female).

== Indonesian names outside of Indonesia ==
Indonesian passports do not divide names into given name, middle name, and family name, and Indonesians who travel outside of Indonesia have trouble filling out registries due to not understanding how they ought to subdivide their names.

== Indexing ==
According to the Chicago Manual of Style, Indonesian names are indexed differently according to the individual practices and customs. If there is one name, it is only indexed under that name. If the family name is printed first, index under the family name with no comma and no inversion.

== See also ==
- Balinese name
- Javanese name
- Marga (Batak)
