= Balinese people =

Ethnic group in Indonesia

ᬳᬦᬓ᭄‌ᬩᬮᬶ, Anak Bali (in the ketah register) ᬯᭀᬂᬩᬮᬶ, Wong Bali (in the madia register) ᬓ᭄ᬭᬫᬩᬮᬶ, Krama Bali (in the singgih register)
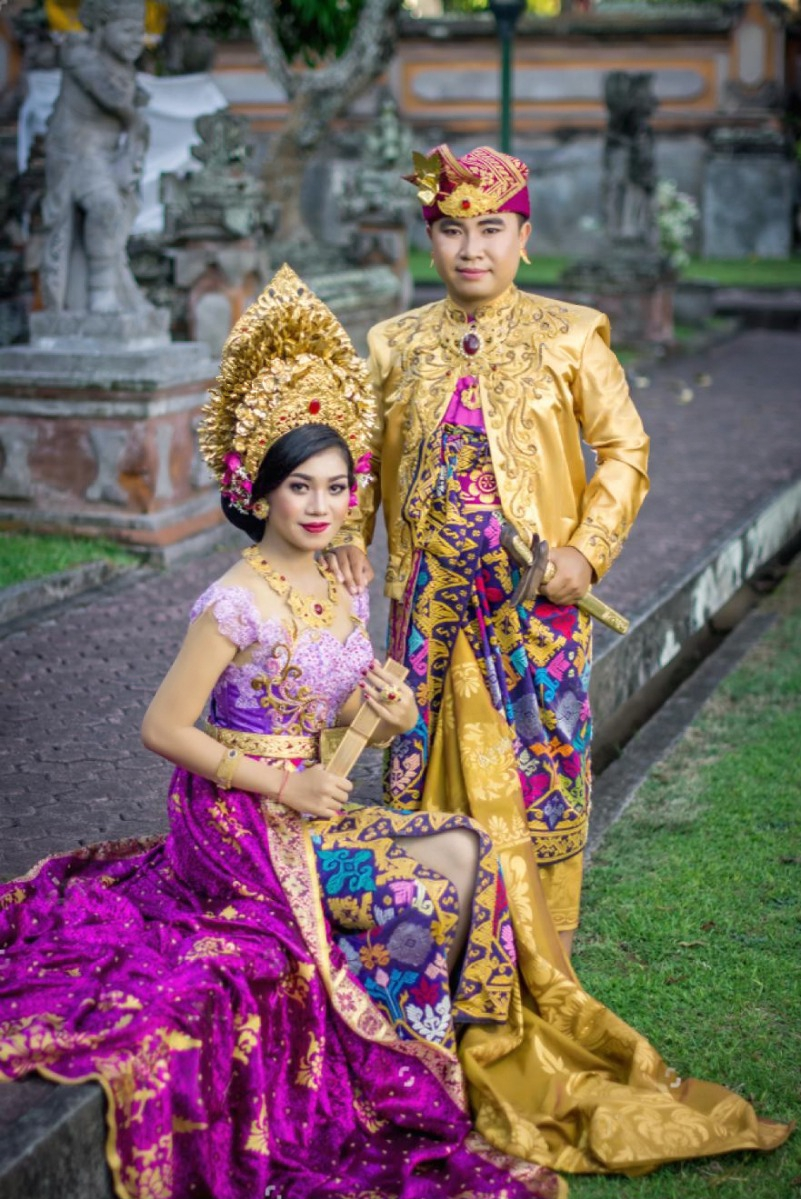
- Balinese couple during their wedding in traditional dress

Total population
- 3,946,416 (2010 Indonesian census)

Regions with significant populations
- Indonesia: 3,946,416
- Bali: 3,336,065
- West Nusa Tenggara: 119,407
- Central Sulawesi: 115,812
- Lampung: 104,810
- Southeast Sulawesi: 49,411
- South Sumatra: 38,552
- South Sulawesi: 27,330
- West Java: 20,832
- East Java: 20,363
- Jakarta: 15,181
- West Sulawesi: 14,657
- North Sulawesi: 14,347
- South Kalimantan: 11,999
- Diaspora: 14,804+
- Malaysia: 6,600 (Note: Est.)
- Australia: 5,529 (Note: Est.)
- Turkey: 1,375
- Germany: 700
- China: ~ 500 (Note: It is not known exactly how many Balinese people there are in China because there are no official records, but there is a Balinese/Balinese Chinese village called Bali Nansan Village, in Nansan, Quanzhou, Fujian, China which was inhabited by 500 people in 1959, Some people, especially the elderly, can still speak Balinese and Indonesian.)
- Netherlands: 250 – 350
- United States: 200 (Note: Est.)
- Singapore: 100 (Note: Est.)

Languages
- Native: Balinese; Dialects: Lowland Bali (Buleleng · Denpasar · Badung · Karangasem · Gianyar · Tabanan · Jembrana · Klungkung), Highland Bali (Bangli), Nusa Penida, Lombok; Also: Indonesian, Kawi and Sanskrit (religious and ceremonial) (Note: Kawi and Sanskrit are also commonly used by some Balinese Hindu priests, as Hindu literature was mostly written in Sanskrit.); Others: English, Dutch (historical)

Religion
- Majority; Balinese Hinduism (95.22%); Minorities; Islam (3.24%) • Christianity (1.26%) • Buddhism (0.26%) • Other (0.02%)

Related ethnic groups
- Austronesian peoples; Bali Aga; Nak Nusé; Sasak; Sumbawa; Javanese; Sundanese; Betawi; Tanimbar Kei; Balinese Chinese

The Balinese (Note: /ˈbɑːlɪniːz/ bah-lih-NEEZ) (Balinese: ᬳᬦᬓ᭄‌ᬩᬮᬶ, romanized: Anak Bali (in the ketah register), ᬯᭀᬂᬩᬮᬶ, Wong Bali (in the madia register), ᬓ᭄ᬭᬫᬩᬮᬶ, Krama Bali (in the singgih register); Indonesian: Orang Bali) are an Austronesian ethnic group native to the Indonesian island of Bali and the surrounding islands. The Balinese population of 4.2 million (1.7% of Indonesia's population) live mostly on the island of Bali, making up 85% of the island's population. The Balinese are distinctive amongst the ethnic groups of Indonesia for their adherence to Balinese Hinduism rather than Abrahamic religions such as Islam or Christianity.

There are also significant populations on the island of Lombok and in the easternmost regions of Java (e.g. Banyuwangi Regency), most of them are descendants of Balinese since the kingdoms era who once controlled the region. Some Balinese can also be found in Balinese migrant areas such as Lampung and Sulawesi regions, mainly due to the migration following the eruption of Mount Agung in 1963 as well as the transmigration program enacted by the Indonesian government.

The Balinese stand out within modern-day Indonesia because they continue to follow Balinese Hinduism rather than the Abrahamic religions that predominate elsewhere in the country. This situation emerged in part because the Dutch colonial administration restricted both Islamisation and Christian missionary activity on the island in order to preserve the already present religious traditions, and in part because the Balinese themselves maintained a strong commitment to their inherited cultural and religious practices. Earlier Hindu–Buddhist traditions had long been predominant in the region. The Orientalist colonial policy that sought to protect and codify Balinese customs later became known as Baliseering (Balinization).

== Origins ==
The Balinese originated from three periods of migration. The first waves of immigrants came from Java and Kalimantan in prehistoric times and were of Proto-Malay stock. The second wave of Balinese came slowly over the years from Java during the Hindu period. The third and final wave came from Java, between the 15th and 16th centuries, about the same time as the conversion to Islam in Java, causing aristocrats and peasants to flee to Bali after the collapse of the Javanese Hindu Majapahit Empire to escape Mataram's Islamic conversion. This in turn reshaped the Balinese culture into a syncretic form of classical Javanese culture mixed with many Balinese elements.

== Genetics ==
A DNA study in 2005 by Karafet et al., found that 84% of Balinese Y-chromosomes are of likely Austronesian origin, 12% of likely Indian origin and 2% of likely Melanesian origin. According to a recent genetic study, the Balinese, together with the Javanese and Sundanese, have a significant admixture of Austroasiatic and Austronesian ancestries.

== Culture ==
Balinese culture is a mix of Balinese Hindu-Buddhist religion and Balinese customs. It is perhaps most known for its dance, drama, and sculpture. The island is also known for its Wayang Kulit or Shadow play theatre. Even in rural and neglected villages, beautiful temples are a common sight; and so are skilful gamelan players and talented actors. Even layered pieces of palm leaf and neat fruit arrangements made as offerings by Balinese women have an artistic side to them. According to Mexican art historian José Miguel Covarrubias, works of art made by amateur Balinese artists are regarded as a form of spiritual offering, and therefore these artists do not care about recognition of their works. Balinese artists are also skilled in duplicating artworks such as carvings that resemble Chinese deities or decorating vehicles based on what is seen in foreign magazines.

The culture is noted for its use of the gamelan in music and various traditional events of Balinese society. Each type of music is designated for a specific type of event. For example, music for a piodalan (birthday celebration) is different from music used for a metatah (teeth grinding) ceremony, just as it is for weddings, Ngaben (cremation of the dead ceremony), Melasti (purification ritual), and so forth. The diverse types of gamelan are also specified according to the different types of dance in Bali. According to Walter Spies, the art of dancing is an integral part of Balinese life as well as an endless critical element in a series of ceremonies or for personal interests.

Traditionally, displaying female breasts is not considered immodest. Balinese women can often be seen with bared chests; however, a display of the thigh is considered immodest. In modern Bali, these customs are normally not strictly observed, but visitors to Balinese temples are advised to cover their legs.

In the Balinese naming system, a person's rank of birth or caste is reflected in the name. Balinese are generally patrilineal, but in the case where a family only has daughters, they can decide if a daughter is the confirmed heir (sentana rajeg). She will then have the same status as if she were a son. The marriage proposal will be carried in reverse; she will be considered the husband (meawak muani) and he the wife (meawak luh), and the children are considered to be part of their mother's family.

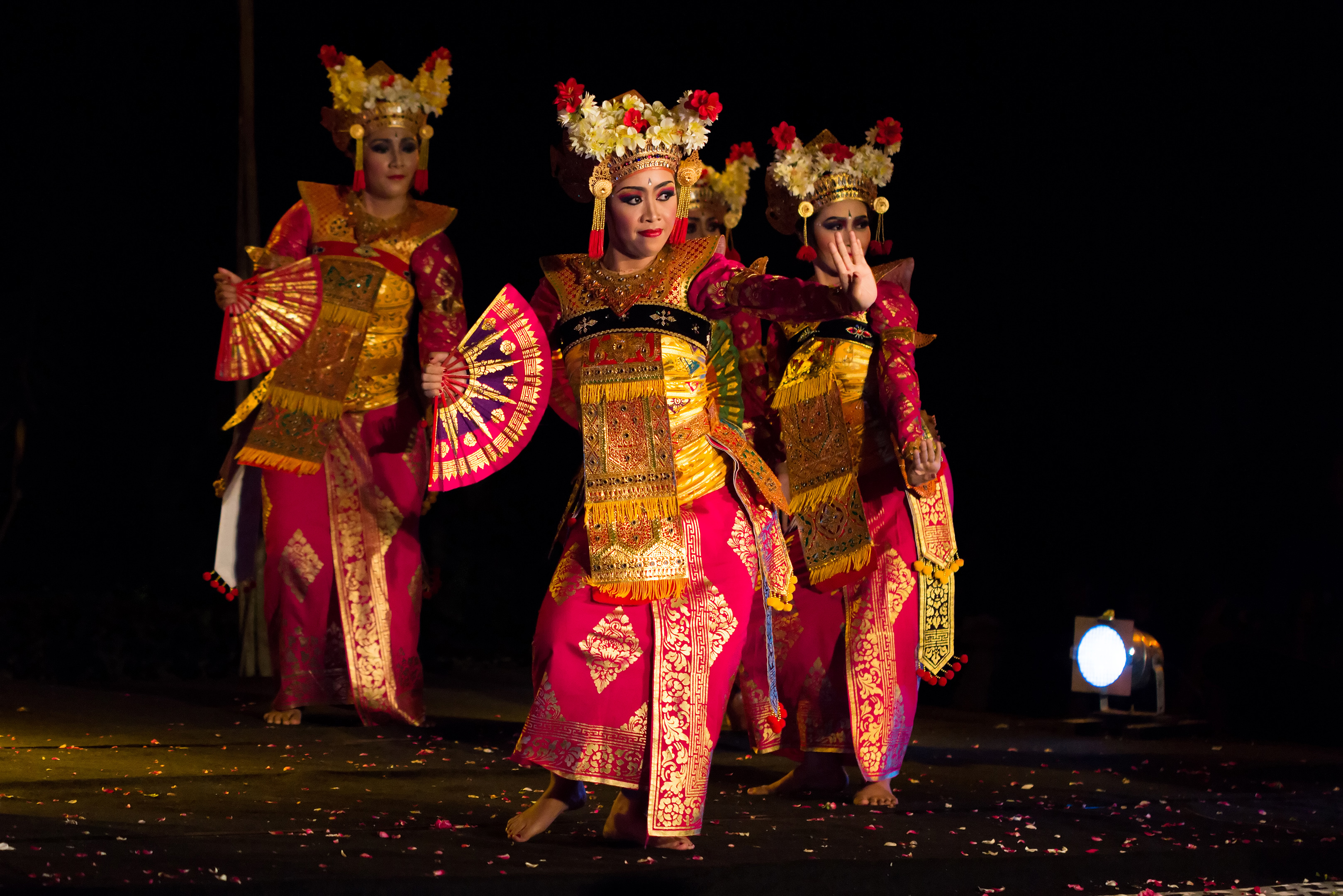
Legong dance

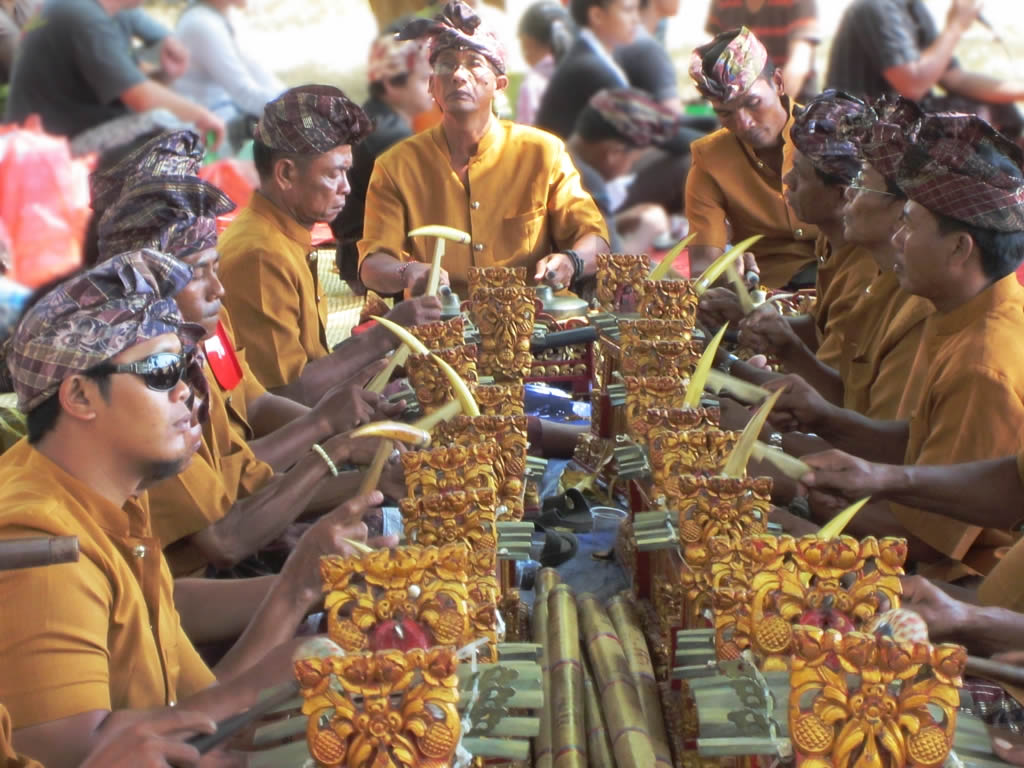
Balinese gamelan

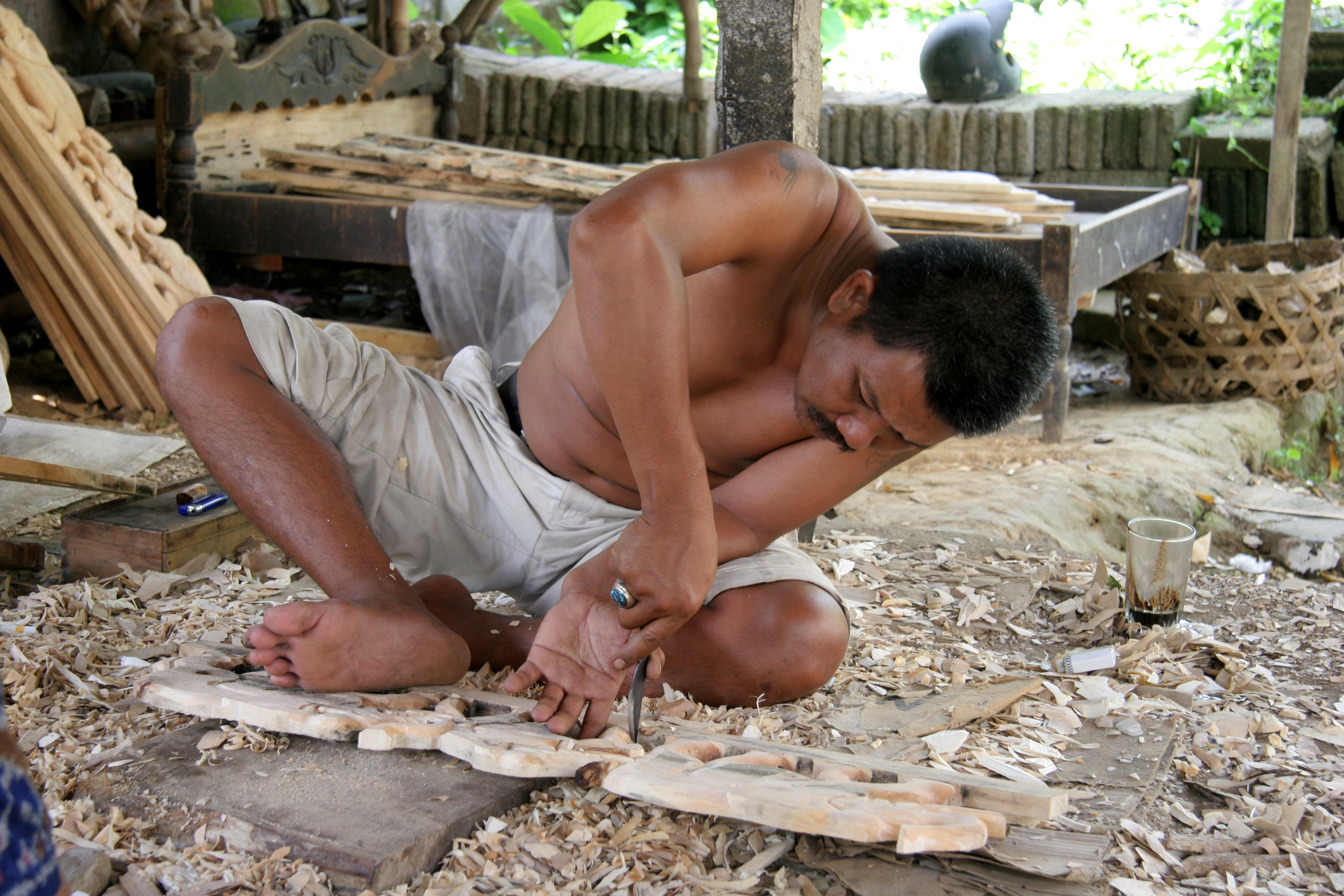
Balinese wood carver

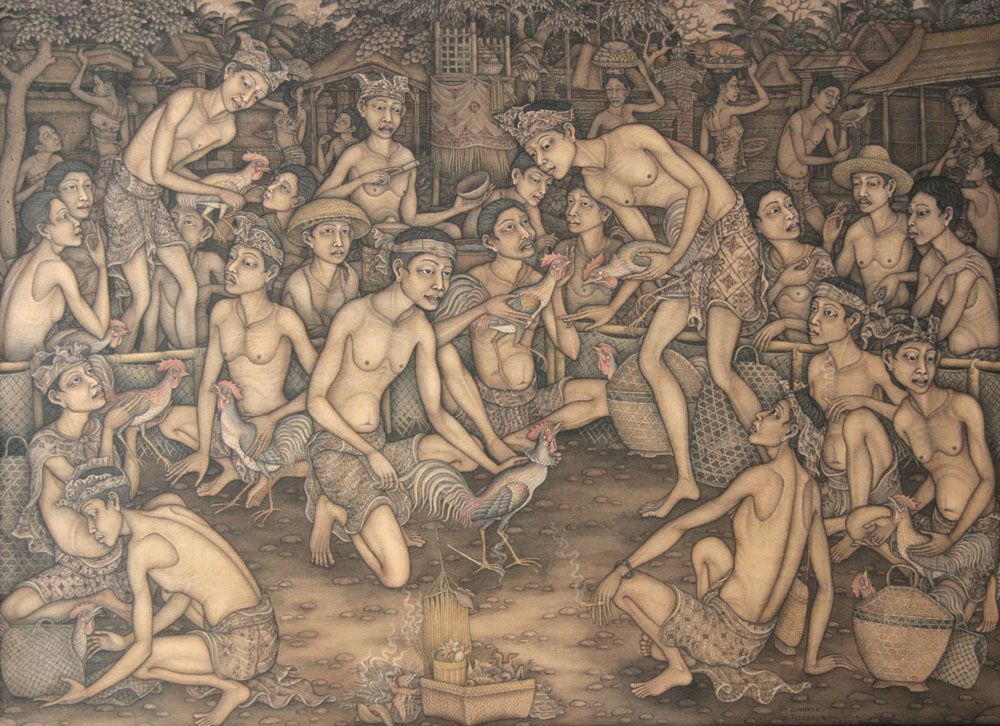
Balinese painting

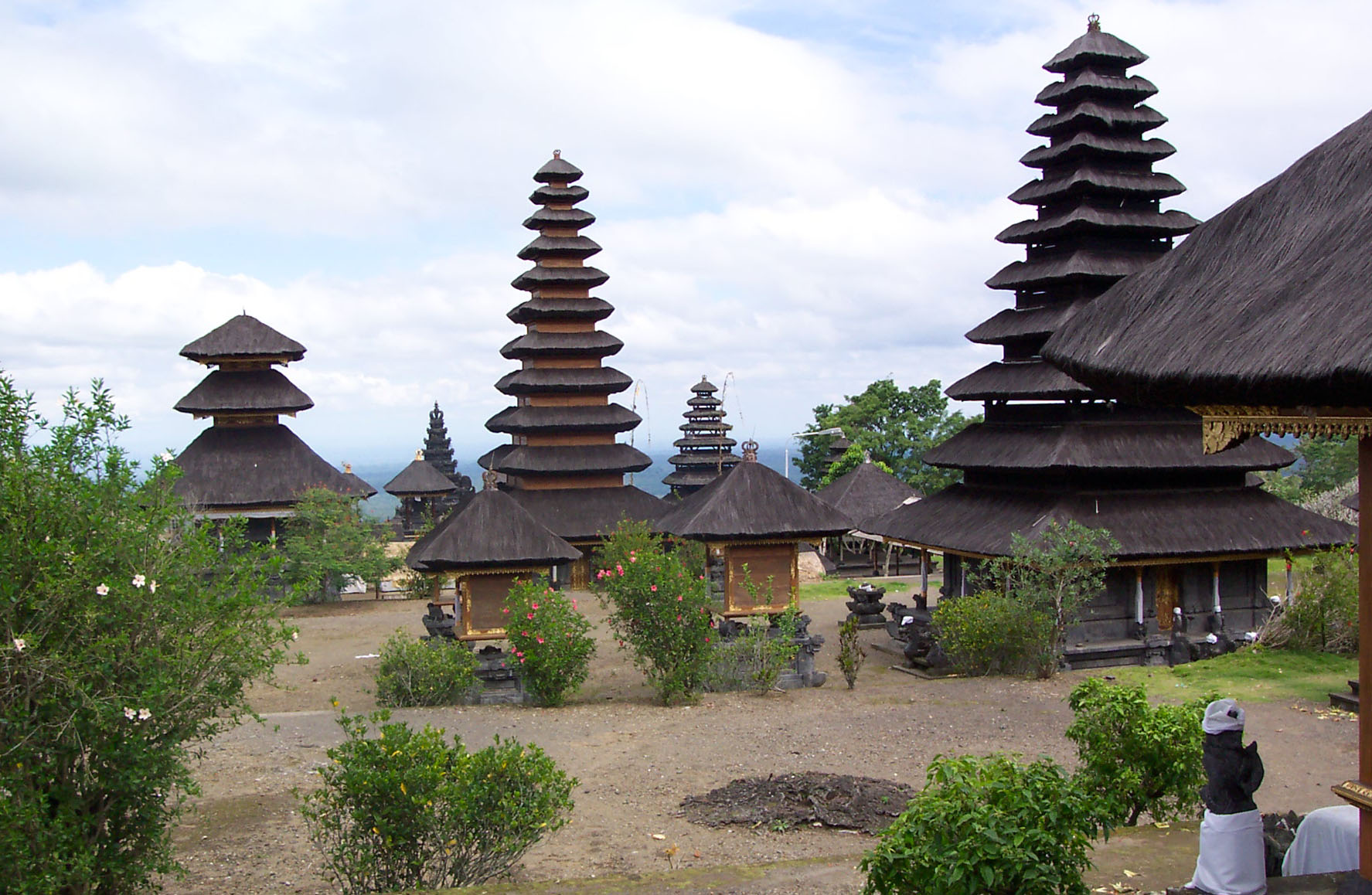
Besakih Temple

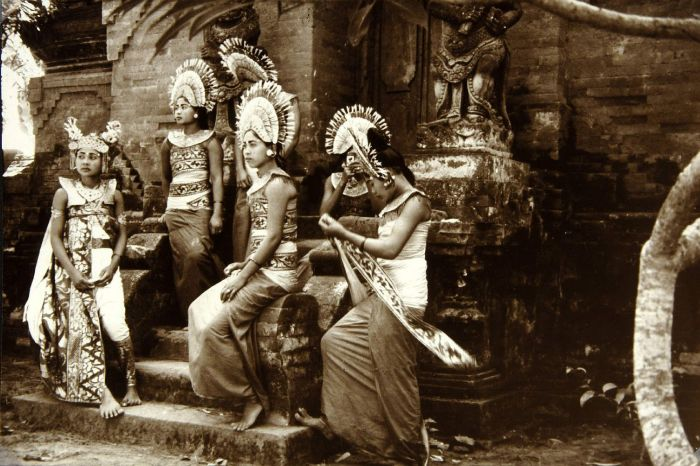
Balinese dancers, c. 1920–1940

=== Puputan ===
A puputan is an act of mass suicide through frontal assaults in battle and was first noted by the Dutch during the colonization of Bali. The latest act of puputan was during the Indonesian War of Independence, with Lt. Colonel I Gusti Ngurah Rai as the leader in the Battle of Margarana. The airport in Bali is named after him in commemoration.

== Religion ==
Religion of Balinese people in Indonesia
Religion	Total
Balinese Hinduism	3,736,993
Islam	127,274
Christianity	49,385
Buddhism	10,378
Others	615
Overall	3,924,645

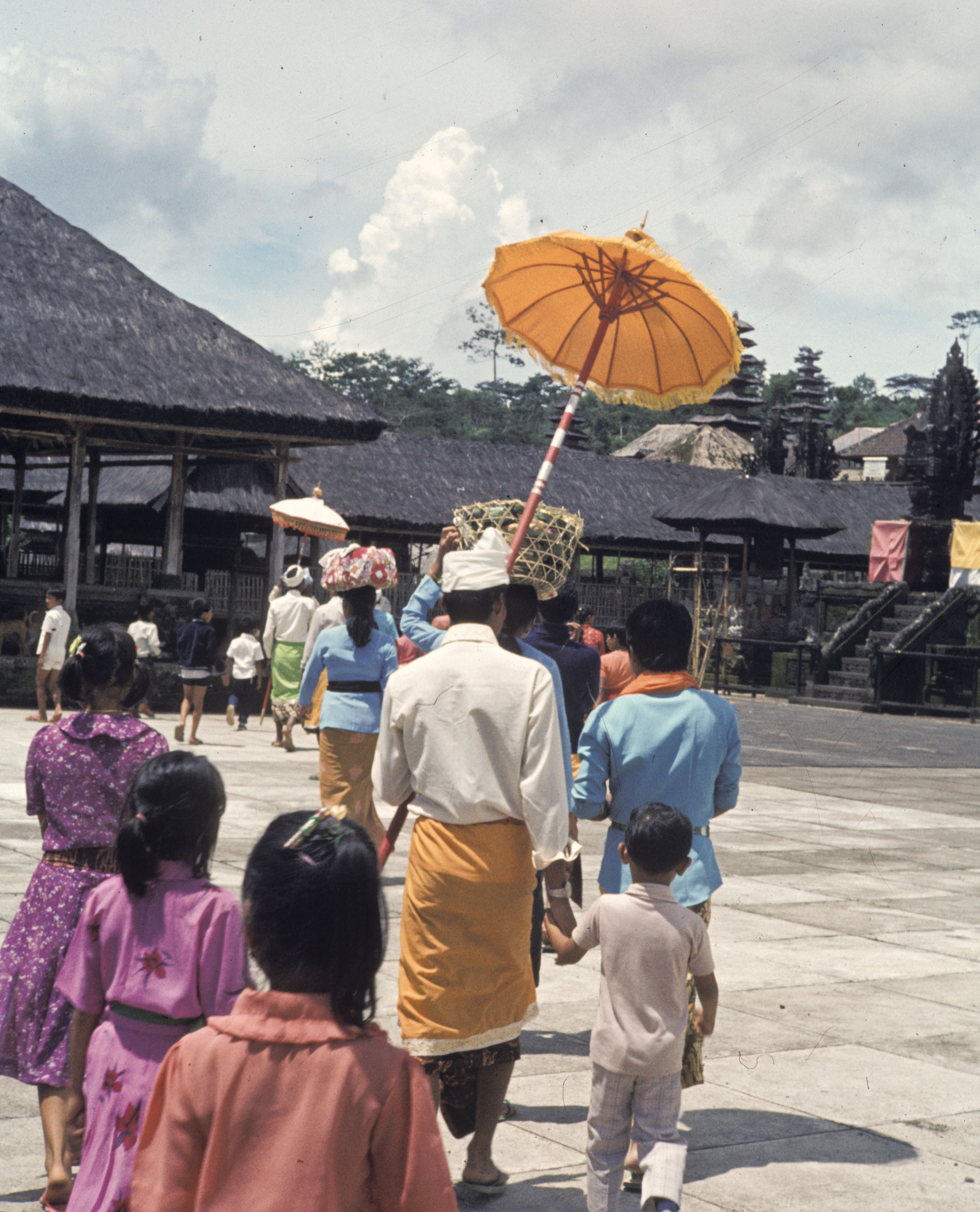
People bringing offerings to a Balinese Hindu temple

The vast majority of Balinese people believe in Agama Tirta (Balinese Hinduism), the "holy-water religion". It is a part of Hinduism. Traveling Indian priests are said to have introduced the people to the sacred literature of Hinduism and Buddhism centuries ago. The people accepted it and combined it with their pre-Hindu mythologies. The Balinese from before the third wave of immigration, known as the Bali Aga, are mostly not followers of Agama Tirta but retain their animist traditions.

Wet rice agriculture is a mainstay of Balinese food production. This system of agriculture is extremely water-intensive and requires a substantial network of irrigation to be effective as a subsistence strategy in Bali. A system of irrigation networks (subak) exists to redistribute access to water in Bali. This network of both underground tunnels (weirs) and canals diverts water from natural water sources into the wet-rice cultivation fields utilized by Balinese farmers to grow their staple crops.

The system of cooperative water redistribution is tied to religious and cultural practices among the Balinese and represents an economic system based on mutual obligation, and managed by the personnel of the water temples (Pura Tirta). Religious officials from these water temples exert spiritual and cultural pressure on the participants in this system and ensure its continuation. These water temples are largely located at the loci of the irrigation networks and manage the distribution of water from the mountainous water sources of the island to lowland areas where water is too scarce for the natural cultivation of rice.

There is evidence this system developed as early as the 11th century CE and has been in continuous use since that time. Genetic evidence indicates that this system spread along kinship lines as the original farming villagers of Bali spread from areas where wet-rice farming originated to less climatically favorable areas of the island. The cultural prestige of certain Pura Titra largely correlates to their position within the subak system, with temples located at major water sources having significant cultural influence. Royalty has associated themselves with major temples of this type, to link their prestige with that of the Pura Titra, and have taken part in the operations of water temples as a means of gaining influence in society.

== Festivals ==
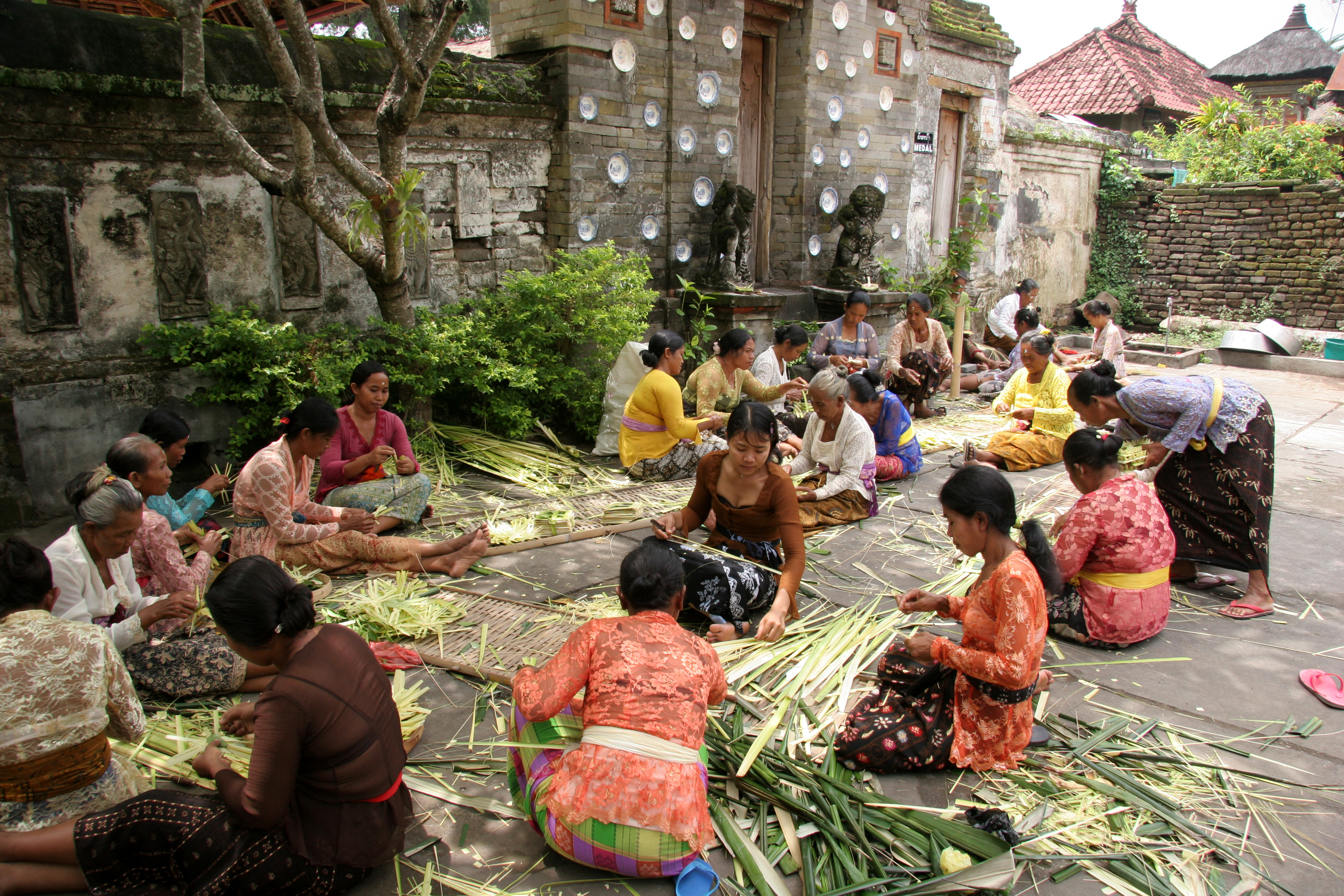
Balinese women preparing for a religious festival

Balinese people celebrate multiple festivals, including the Kuta Carnival, the Sanur Village Festival, and the Bali Kite Festival, where participants fly fish-, bird-, and leaf-shaped kites while an orchestra plays traditional music.

== See also ==
- Balinization
- Bali Kingdom
- Balinese caste system
- Balinese Kshatriya
- Nyepi
- Galungan
- Sanghyang
- Kecak
- Canang sari
- Austronesian expansion
- Potong gigi, a Balinese cutting teeth ritual of Austronesian lile origin, see also Austronesian peoples.
- Balinese calendar
