= Febrianto =

Febrianto is a name. People with the name include:

- Wawan Febrianto
- Rizky Dwi Febrianto
- Irvan Febrianto
- Febrianto Wijaya
- Anto Febrianto Boyratan
