= Human tooth sharpening =

Practice of manually sharpening the teeth

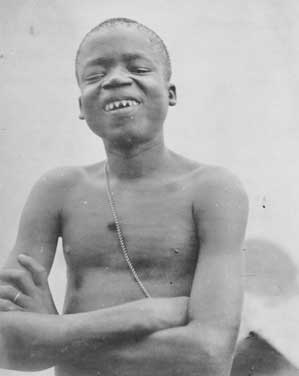
Ota Benga, a famous Congolese pygmy, shows off his sharpened teeth.

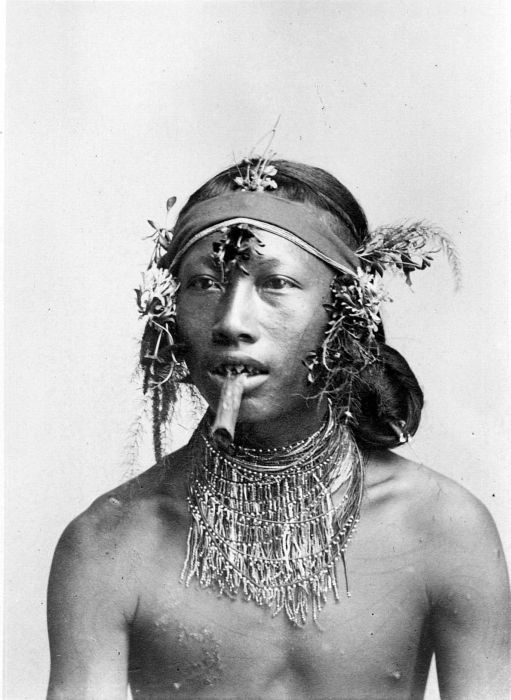
A man with filed teeth (probably Mentawai) smokes in a photograph by Dutch photographer Christiaan Benjamin Nieuwenhuis, who worked in Sumatra.

Human tooth sharpening is the practice of manually sharpening the teeth, usually the front incisors. Filed teeth are customary in various cultures. Many remojadas figurines found in parts of Mexico have filed teeth and it is believed to have been common practice in their culture. The Zappo Zap people of the Democratic Republic of Congo are believed to have filed their teeth.

Historically it was done for spiritual purposes, with some exceptions, but in modern times it is usually aesthetic in nature as a form of body modification.

== History ==
Many cultures have practised this form of body modification. In Bali, in a ritual known as Potong gigi or cut teeth, teenagers have their canine teeth filed down because it is thought they represented negative emotions such as anger and jealousy. It is also seen as a way to spiritually separate them from their animalistic instincts and ancestors. After this tradition is completed the teens are now considered adults and are allowed to marry. During this ritual the person receiving the procedure is dressed in traditional clothing and would be carried from place to place by their parents as they are not allowed to touch the ground. This is done to avoid encountering evil forces. In a more modernized version of the ritual, the teen would wear socks to walk from place to place in order to stay off the ground.

Around the year 1910, the African Herero people participated in forms of tooth sharpening. Both the boys and girls at puberty would have four of their lower teeth knocked out using a sledgehammer. This was followed by the top teeth being sharpened to points that resembled a "V". The tribe regarded this tradition as a form of beauty. It was said that a girl that had not undergone this procedure would not be able to attract a lover.

In ancient China, a group called Ta-ya Kih-lau (打牙仡佬, literally "仡佬 (Gelao people) who beat out their teeth") had every woman about to wed knock out two of her anterior teeth to "prevent damage to the husband's family." Some cultures have distinctions between which sex does what to their teeth. In the central Congo region, the Upoto tribe has men file only teeth in the maxillary arch, whereas women file both maxillary and mandibular arches.

The Mentawai people have also traditionally engaged in this practice. The Mentawai people believed that the soul and body were separate. If the soul was not pleased by its body it would leave and the person would die. As a result, the Mentawai people started modifying their bodies to be more beautiful. In Mentawai culture, those with teeth that have been sharpened are deemed more beautiful. Tooth sharpening would have been traditionally done at puberty, though contact with outside civilizations has resulted in a decline of tooth sharpening. Today, the Mentawai people use a sharpened chisel and another object that acts as a hammer. They use no anesthetics or pain killers, and bite down on a piece of wood. Green bananas are bitten on to reduce pain after the procedure.

David Livingstone mentioned a number of African tribes who practiced teeth-filing, including the Bemba, Yao, Makonde, Matambwe, Mboghwa and Chipeta.

Koesbardiati, Toetik mentions Indonesian tribes that practice human teeth sharpening in the prehistoric and Islamic populations of Indonesia. In the prehistoric populations of Java, Bali, Sumba, and Flores, dental modifications primarily occurred in canines and incisors but not all of the modifications were for survival. The extraction method practiced by the Flores was for beauty purposes. Human teeth sharpening also continued to occur during the 17th century but this was mostly practiced by those in nobility or those with social prominence. Skeletal remains in the area show that dental filing occurred.

== Examples in the modern world ==
- Horace Ridler, "the Zebra man", included tooth sharpening as one of many body modifications he underwent in order to serve as a circus performer.
- In the Indonesian population of Bali, there is a sacred religious practice in which the maxillary front teeth are filed for the purpose of refraining from evil lust. Note that the teeth are flattened, not sharpened.
- In the Indonesian population of Timor, residents file the occlusion surface for beauty purposes as it makes the residents feel more comfortable around others.
- Among the Mentawai people in Indonesia, the wife of the soon-to-be chief decides to have her teeth sharpened as a sign of great beauty.
