= Ngelawang =

Ngelawang is a preparatory ritual performed by Hindus in Bali, Indonesia.

Ngelawang performed by a group of children with Barong Bangkung paraded around the village and accompanied by Gamelan

Ngelawang is a tradition in the celebration of the feast Galungan and Hari Raya Kuningan in Bali.

Ngelawang derived from the gates (doors) which means ngelawang is staging conducted from house to house and from village to village using bangkung barong (a barong pig figure). This tradition aims to drive out evil spirits and protect the population from outbreaks or diseases caused by spirits (bhuta kala). At the time lasted ngelawang, the homeowner will provide the money as haturan. From an early age, the ngelawang tradition has instilled values of togetherness, mutual cooperation, and strong solidarity among the villagers. Through this enjoyable activity, children learn to work together as a team.

== History ==
Ngelawang derived from the mythological goddess Ulun Danu who turns into a giant who helps the villagers with evil spirits. Once this ritual was a sacred rite, and if barong scattered feathers, the people would pick them up and make them as auspicious objects. Now, Ngelawang is an art show presented for the children.

== See also ==
- Balinese calendar
