= Javanese name =

Javanese people have various systems and customs for personal names. Indonesians generally do not divide their names into "given names" and "surnames", and it is not uncommon for men especially from older generations to have only one name. Among Javanese Indonesians, children typically do not share a family name with their parents. Instead, they occasionally have composite names combining elements of both parents' names, or use their father's names in addition to their own, in a similar manner to European patronymics.

Until the 1960s, upon reaching adulthood it was common for people in Indonesia to replace the childhood name given by their parents with a new name called the nama tua.

== Structure ==
Culturally, Javanese people use a patrilineal and also matrilineal system that traces the hierarchic lineage of the father and mother. For example, Abdurrahman Wahid's name is derived from Wahid Hasyim, his father, an independence fighter and minister. In turn, Wahid Hasyim's name was derived from his father named Hasyim Asyari, a cleric and founder of the Nahdlatul Ulama organization. Another example is former President Megawati Sukarnoputri; the last part of the name is a patronymic, meaning "Sukarno's daughter". This system is particularly used to determine descendants' rights to use royal titles before their names.

However, it is not customary for Javanese to pass on a family name, except in Suriname, which has a large Javanese population. Surnames in Suriname Javanese are usually derived from the names of their ancestors who emigrated from Java between 1890 and 1939. Suriname Javanese people usually used Western (mostly Dutch) given names, and Javanese surnames, many of which are archaic in Java itself. The examples of Suriname Javanese surnames are Atmodikoro, Bandjar, Dasai, Hardjoprajitno, Irodikromo, Kromowidjojo, Moestadja, Pawironadi, Redjosentono, Somohardjo, etc. Other Javanese communities who have surnames are the Jatons (Jawa Tondano/Tondano Javanese), descendants of Prince Diponegoro's followers exiled to North Sulawesi. Some of their surnames are Arbi, Baderan, Djoyosuroto, Guret, Kiaidemak, Modjo, Ngurawan, Pulukadang, Suratinoyo, Wonopati, Zees, etc.

Some Javanese, especially those from older generations, have a single name; for example, Sukarno, Suharto, and Boediono. Some names are derived from native Javanese language, while some others are derived from Sanskrit. Names with the prefix Su-, which means good, are very popular. After the advent of Islam, many Javanese used Arabic names, especially those amongst clerics and the northern coast population, where Islamic influence is stronger. There are many Javanese-style Arabic names such as Marpuah (from Marfu'ah), Ngabdurohman (from Abdurrahman), Sarip (from Sharif), Slamet (from Salamah), Solikin (from Salihin), etc.

== Social and religious connotations ==
In the past, commoners usually had only one-word names, while nobles had names of two or more words but rarely used a surname. Due to the influence of other cultures, many started using names from other languages, mainly European. Catholic Javanese usually use Latin baptismal names followed by a traditional Javanese name, for example Albertus Soegijopranoto, the first Indonesian bishop. Albertus is his baptismal name, while Soegijopranoto is his traditional Javanese given name.

Until recently, there was no obligation to have a family name in Indonesia. However, it has become more popular for Javanese parents to give family names to their children. The family names are derived from paternal given names.

It is also noteworthy that names based on religious connotations sometimes don't necessarily means that the person (or their parents) are adherents of said religion, as many Javanese (and Indonesians to a larger degree) took inspirations from various cultural sources. Consider, for example, Christians/Muslims with Hindu names (e.g. Wisnu, a common male name, Giring Ganesha, etc.), Muslims/Hindu/Buddhist with Christian sounding names (e.g. Kristiani Herrawati), or Buddhist/Hindu/Christian with Muslim/Arabic names (e.g. Sulaiman, Hassan, and other common Arabic names).

== See also ==
- Indonesian names
