= Bhutanese name =

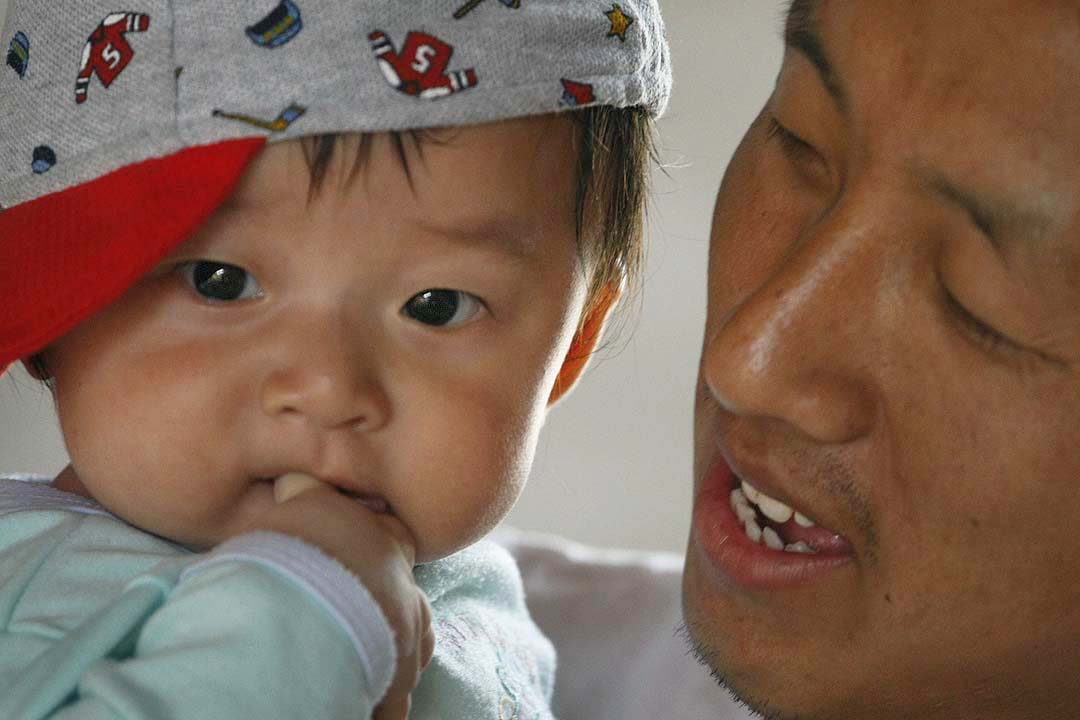
Babies in Bhutan are typically named by religious leaders rather than their parents.

Bhutanese names usually consist of one or two given names, and no family names, with the exception of names of foreign origin and some family names of prominent families, such as the royal family name Wangchuck. The second given name or the combination of the given names may indicate a person's gender.

Bhutanese people are traditionally mononymous. There are around 19,000 unique names in Bhutan, and the most common names are Tshering, Sonam, Dorji, Kinley, Sangay, and Karma. Babies are typically not named immediately after birth; instead, parents will seek spiritual guidance from a religious leader such as a lama to name their babies within the first few weeks of their life. Names often have some religious significance. Some famous lamas are asked to name babies every time they travel, which can become taxing, so they may carry slips of paper with pre-written names on them to give out quickly. Some lamas may impart blessings on children by giving them names derived from their own. Names may also be chosen by looking through religious texts or through astrological symbols. Many people are named after the day of the week on which they were born. When babies are named, there is a ceremony at a local temple or monastery. Blessings are offered to local gods to ensure the well-being of the children. New names are usually given to babies, but adults may also assume new names at different stages of their lives.

Because mononyms are uncommon in most of the world, some Bhutanese people use the place of their birth as a surname when traveling abroad. In modern times, some Bhutanese parents go against tradition and name their own children. A relatively new naming practice in Bhutan involves using the name of a child's father as a patronymic surname.
