= Balinese name =

Names used on the Indonesian island

A Balinese name is part of a system of identification used by the Balinese people and in the western parts of the neighboring island of Lombok, Indonesia. A Balinese name will have three parts: a title, a birth order name and a personal name. Most Balinese people do not use a family name.

Both boys and girls receive birth order name from a small typical group of names for each birth order position. These names may vary due to caste, regional customs and variations in the Balinese language between the north and the south of the island. Balinese people use the birth order name to refer to one another.

As most Balinese are Hindus, many names will be of Sanskrit origin. Some people have traditional Balinese names.

== Birth order ==
A birth order name is chosen from a few typical names according to the position of the child in the birth order of siblings. The people of Bali use the birth order name to refer to one another.

The first born are named Wayan, Putu, Gede or for a girl, Ni Luh. Wayan is a Balinese name meaning "eldest".

Second born children are named Made, Kadek, or Nengah. Made and Nengah mean madya or "middle". Kadek means "little brother" or "little sister".

The third born is given the name Nyoman or Komang. These names may be shortened to "Man" and "Mang" respectively.

Fourth born children are named Ketut. Ketut is often shortened to "Tut".

If there is a fifth child in the family, he is often called Wayan Balik (meaning "Wayan again").

== Names according to caste ==
The naming system allows a person to recognise another's caste. A person's caste, unlike in India, is relatively unimportant to the Balinese people. The idea of caste flowed into Balinese culture as close links with Hindu-Buddhist Java evolved. The inclusion of the caste may also have been due to Airlangga (991–1049), a half Balinese raja of the Kediri Kingdom.

The naming system of the peasant farmers of Bali may have preceded the idea of the caste. The farmers included indigenous Balinese and very early Hindu-Buddhist missionaries and their followers. The farmers represented a caste level that in India, would be called Sudra. This "farmer caste" also used birth order names, perhaps to indicate inheritance.

=== Sudra ===
Beyond the birth order name, there are no special names to denote people from the Sudra caste. Those of the Sudra caste add an "I" (male) and "Ni" (female) in front of their names. For example, I Made Mangku Pastika was the governor of Bali.

=== Wesya ===
The Wesya is the trader and farmer caste. The Wesya once added "Ngakan", "Kompyang", "Sang", or "Si" before their name. However, most no longer do so due to assimilation into the Sudra. An example is Ngakan Gede Sugiarta Garjitha, a major general.

=== Ksatria ===
The Ksatria caste are the ruling and military elite in Hindu society. Some typical names of people of the Ksatria caste include: I Gusti Ngurah (male), I Gusti Ayu (female), Anak Agung (male), Anak Agung Ayu or Anak Agung Istri (female), Tjokorda which is sometimes abbreviated as Tjok (male), Tjokorda Istri (female), Ida I Dewa, Dewa Agung or I Dewa (male), and I Dewa Ayu, and Desak (female).

The name Gusti literally means "leader" as members of the Ksatria were often families promoted from the aristocrat caste. The Ksatria often use birth order names. Sometimes the Ksatria borrow the whole order of the aristocrat caste names, so it is possible to find a name like I Gusti Ketut Rajendra, indicating a male of the Ksatria caste, fourth born, whose personal name is Rajendra.

The word Agung means "great", or "prominent". The word Tjokorda is a conjunction of the Sanskrit words Tjoka and Dewa. It literally means "the foot of the Gods", and is awarded to the highest members of the aristocracy.

Another typical name might be Anak Agung Rai, meaning a Ksatria, whose personal name means "the great one". It is more difficult to differentiate sexes by name alone among the Ksatria people, though personal names often tell, like Putra, or "prince", for a boy, and Putri, or "princess", for a girl.

An example is Sri Aji Kresna Kepakisan (reign 1352 CE to 1380 CE). Other examples are I Gusti Ngurah Rai, military commander and national hero, Ide Anak Agung Gde Agung, former Indonesian Minister of Foreign Affairs, Tjokorda Gde Raka Soekawati, president of the State of East Indonesia, Dewa Made Beratha, a former Governor of Bali.

=== Brahmana ===
The Brahmin caste are academics, intellectuals, economists, aristocrats and lawyers. Names for the Brahmana caste include Ida Bagus (male), Ida Ayu (female). A typical name might be Ida Ayu Ngurah, meaning "Brahman woman, Beautiful highness whose personal name is Ngurah [gift from heaven]". Other examples are Ida Ayu Oka Rusmini, novelist; Ida Bagus Oka, a former governor of Bali and Ida Bagus Ngurah Parthayana, an Indonesian YouTuber from Bali that also known as Turah Parthayana.

Inter-caste marriages occur. Those who marry someone from a higher caste will adopt the name Jero ("come in") in front of their name.

== Gender ==
A name may have a prefix to indicate gender, I for males and Ni for females. Typical names are. for example, I Wayan Pedjeng (first-born male whose personal name is "moon") or Ni Ketut Sulastri (fourth-born female whose personal name is "fine light"). Unlike Javanese names, Balinese names of Sanskrit origin do not experience vowel change from final -a to -o (as in Javanese Susilo, from Susila), albeit they are still pronounced as schwa /ə/ in Balinese (pronounced like *Susile).

== See also ==
- Indonesian names
