= Nabila =

Nabila, and its variant spellings Nabeela, Nabillah, Nebila, and Nabeelah, is the feminine variation of the given name Nabil, meaning noble. Notable people with the name include:

== Given name ==
=== Nabela ===
- Nabela Noor (born 1991), Bengali-American entrepreneur and online influencer
- Nabela Qoser (born 1986), Hong Kong journalist

=== Nabila ===
- Nabila Aghanim, Algerian cosmologist
- Nabila al-Zawahiri, daughter of Ayman al-Zawahiri
- Nabila al-Zubayr, Yemeni poet and novelist
- Nabila Bouatia-Naji, Moroccan cardiologist
- Nabila Ebeid (born 1945), Egyptian actress
- Nabila El-Bassel, American academic
- Nabila El-Nabulsi, Syrian actress
- Nabila Erian, Egyptian professor and singer
- Nabila Espanioly, Palestinian and Israeli activist
- Nabila Hakim Ali Khan, Pakistani politician
- Nabila Huda, Malaysian actress
- Nabila Idoughi (born 1986), French-Algerian footballer
- Nabila Idris, Bangladeshi activist
- Nabila Imloul (born 1982), Algerian footballer
- Nabila Jamshed, Indian writer
- Nabila Khashoggi, Lebanese-American businesswoman and actress
- Nabila Mounib, Moroccan politician
- Nabila Ramdani, French journalist
- Nabila Razali, Malaysian singer and actress
- Nabila Rmili, Moroccan politician
- Nabila Tapia, Dominican beauty pageant titleholder, model, and actress
- Nabila Taqiyyah, Indonesian singer
- Nabila Tizi (born 1984), Algerian handball player
- Nabila Syakieb, Indonesian actress

=== Nabilah ===
- Nabilah Ratna Ayu Azalia (born 1999), Indonesian actress and former member of the JKT48
- Nabilah Lubis (1942–2026), Indonesian philologist, writer, translator and lecturer
- Nabilah Parkes (born 1989), American politician
- Nabilah Naggayi Sempala (born 1972), Ugandan politician
- Nabilah al-Tunisi (born 1959), chief engineer for Saudi Aramco

=== Nebila ===
- Nebila Abdulmelik (born 1987), Ethiopian activist

== Surname ==
=== Nabila ===
- John S. Nabila (died 2025), Ghanaian politician, geographer, philanthropist and academic
- Masuma Rahman Nabila (born 1985), Bangladeshi film actress and model
- Sadia Nabila, Bangladeshi-Australian actress

=== Nabilah ===
- Farah Nabilah, Malaysian actress and model
- Nur Atikah Nabilah (born 1991), Singaporean gymnast

== See also ==
- Kingdom 5KR, a Benetti build superyacht previously named Nabila
