= Yanuar Tri Firmanda =

Indonesian footballer

Yanuar Tri
Personal information
- Full name: Yanuar Tri Firmanda
- Date of birth: 31 January 1980 (age 46)
- Place of birth: Malang, East Java, Indonesia
- Height: 1.75 m (5 ft 9 in)
- Position: Goalkeeper

Senior career*
Years	Team	Apps	(Gls)
2008	Persin Sinjai		
2008–2009	PSIR Rembang		
2010–2011	Deltras	18	(0)
2011–2012	Persiba Balikpapan	3	(0)
- * Club domestic league appearances and goals as of 11 July 2012

Yanuar Tri Firmanda (born January 31, 1980, in Malang) is an Indonesian former footballer.

== Club statistics ==
Club	Season	Super League		Premier Division		Piala Indonesia		Total	
Club	Season	Apps	Goals	Apps	Goals	Apps	Goals	Apps	Goals
Persiba Balikpapan	2010-11	18	0	-		-		18	0
Persiba Balikpapan	2011-12	3	0	-		-		3	0
Total		21	0	-		-		21	0
