= Nabila Bouatia-Naji =

Moroccan cardiologist

- Occupation: Cardiologist
- Awards: Fellow of the African Academy of Sciences (2018)

Academic background
- Education: Lille University of Science and Technology; Lille 2 University of Health and Law
- Thesis: Implication des voies métaboliques associées à l'insuline dans la susceptibilité aux formes polygéniques d'obésité: études des gènes candidats ACDC/Adiponectine et ENPP1/PC-1 (2006)
- Doctoral advisor: Philippe Froguel

Academic work
- Discipline: Medical genetics
- Institutions: Inserm; Paris Cardiovascular Research Center

Nabila Bouatia-Naji is a Moroccan cardiologist who specialises in cardiovascular diseases specific to women and in medical genetics. She is a Fellow of the African Academy of Sciences.

== Biography ==
A Moroccan, Nabila Bouatia-Naji studied at Lille University of Science and Technology, where she got her degree in molecular and cellular biology, and at Lille 2 University of Health and Law, where she got her PhD in human genetics; her doctoral dissertation Implication des voies métaboliques associées à l'insuline dans la susceptibilité aux formes polygéniques d'obésité: études des gènes candidats ACDC/Adiponectine et ENPP1/PC-1 (2006) was supervised by Philippe Froguel. She later worked at the MRC Laboratory of Molecular Biology as a postdoctoral fellow.

In 2009, she started working at Inserm as a research associate, before moving to the Paris Cardiovascular Research Center (PARCC) in 2011. At PARCC, she was later promoted to director of research and team director, with one of her leading teams being funded by a European Research Council Starting Grant.

She specialises in cardiovascular diseases specific to women, having been recognised by the University of Nantes as an expert, as well as the genetic causes of diseases like diabetes and cardiovascular disease. Her earliest medical genetics research was on diabetes before expanding to cardiovascular diseases. She is also an advocate for women in STEM, particularly in leadership roles and health sciences.

After becoming a finalist for the 2014 American Heart Association Functional Genomics and Translational Biology Young Investigator Award, she was awarded the 2016 Young Investigator Award at the 2016 International Congress of Human Genetics. In 2018, she was elected a Fellow of the African Academy of Sciences. She was awarded the 2023 Corazón de Mujer Award. In 2026, she won the Antoinette Fouque Prize in the 'Think' category.
