= Simatupang =

Batak surname originating in Indonesia

Simatupang is one of Toba Batak clans originating in North Sumatra, Indonesia. People of this clan bear the clan's name as their surname. Notable people of this clan include:

- T. B. Simatupang, (1920–1990) Indonesian military officer
- Iwan Simatupang, (1928–1970) Indonesian novelist
- Sahala Hamonangan Simatupang, (1918–1992) Indonesian politician
