= Nainggolan =

Nainggolan is a surname. Notable people with the surname include:

- Radja Nainggolan (born 1988), Belgian football player
- Rustam Effendy Nainggolan (born 1950), Indonesian politician
- Jafar Nainggolan (born 1946), Indonesian retired army officer and politician
