= Panjaitan =

Panjaitan or Pandjaitan is one of Toba Batak clans originating in North Sumatra, Indonesia. Notable people of this clan include:

- Hinca Panjaitan
- Lundu Panjaitan
- Sintong Panjaitan
- D. I. Pandjaitan
- Luhut Binsar Pandjaitan
