= Potong gigi =

Ritual body modification in Bali

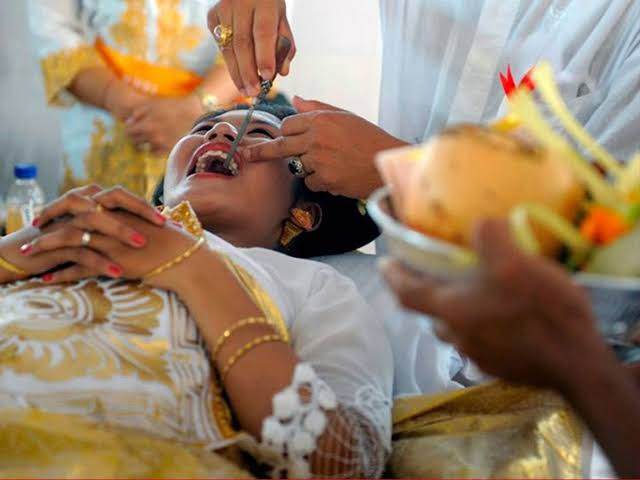
Indonesian traditional ritual in Bali

Potong gigi, also known as mesangih or mepandes, is a form of ritual body modification of adolescents, typically teenagers, in parts of Bali that involves the filing of the canine teeth.

== History ==
Traditional Balinese belief states that "protruding canines represent the animal-like nature of human beings"; the purpose of the ritual is to sever ties with these animal instincts and show others that the individual is old enough to marry. Considered a generational ritual, parents of adolescents performing it consider it their "final duty" in being a parent before their child becomes an adult. Reasons adolescents take part in the ceremony are mixed, as they must take into consideration the impacts of globalization with traditional Balinese ritual.
