= Balinese calendar =

The Balinese observe (besides the Gregorian calendar) two completely different and not synchronized calendars:

- The Balinese pawukon calendar, a numeric calendar of 210 days per year
- The Balinese saka calendar, a lunisolar calendar starting every Nyepi
