= Febrianto Wijaya =

Indonesian footballer

Febryanto Wijaya
Personal information
- Full name: Febrianto Wijaya
- Date of birth: 20 February 1990 (age 36)
- Place of birth: Mamuju, Indonesia
- Height: 1.76 m (5 ft 9 1/2 in)
- Position: Forward

Youth career
- 2000–2003: Makassar Football School
- 2003–2006: PSM Makassar
- 2007: VfB Stuttgart
- 2007: Persib Bandung

Senior career*
Years	Team	Apps	(Gls)
2008–2009	PSM Makassar	29	(6)
2008	→ Persipura Jayapura (loan)	6	(1)
2009	Persiram Raja Ampat	13	(0)
2010	Pro Duta	10	(0)
2010–2011	Medan Chiefs	20	(4)
2011–2013	Persela Lamongan	27	(2)

International career
2005	Indonesia U-17		
- * Club domestic league appearances and goals as of 11 July 2012

Febrianto Wijaya (born February 20, 1990) is an Indonesian former footballer. He is currently the Director of the PSM Academy based in Mamuju Regency, West Sulawesi, and has served as a member of the Mamuju Provincial Legislatives Council (DPRD) for the 2014–2019 and 2019–2024 periods. He is a descendant of Tionghoa.

== Club statistics ==
Club	Season	Super League		Premier Division		Piala Indonesia		Total	
Club	Season	Apps	Goals	Apps	Goals	Apps	Goals	Apps	Goals
Persela Lamongan	2011-12	2	0	-		-		2	0
Total		2	0	-		-		2	0
