= Omed-omedan =

Ceremony held by young people of Banjar Kaja Sesetan, Bali, Indonesia

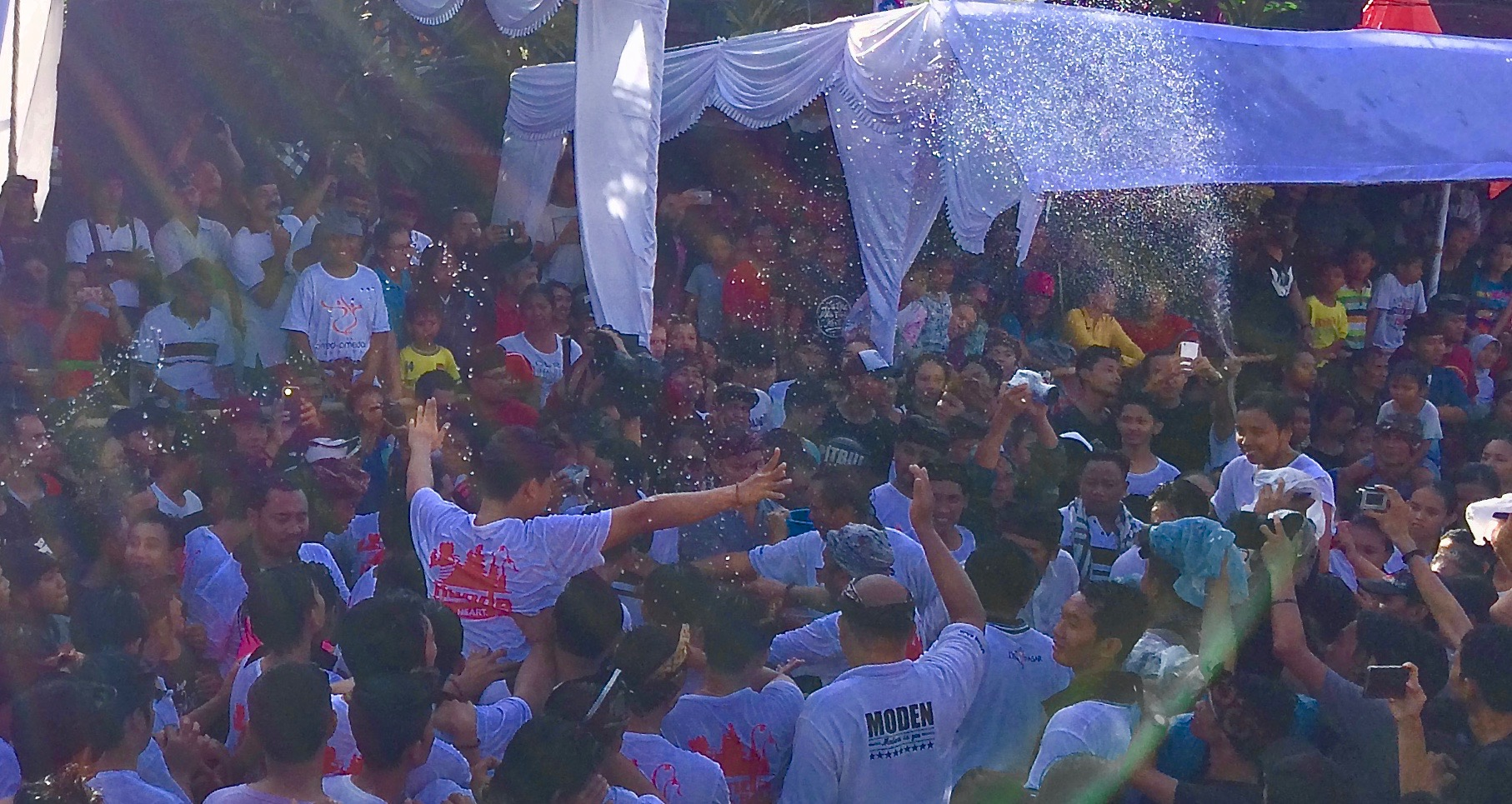
2017 omed-omedan ceremony in Sesetan, Denpasar, Bali

Omed-omedan (also spelled Oméd-omédan; Indonesian pronunciation: [ɔ.mɛd.ɔˈmɛ.dan]), or "The Kissing Ritual", is a ceremony that is held by the young people of Banjar Kaja Sesetan, Denpasar, Bali. Omed-omedan is held on the day of ngembak geni (a day after Nyepi) to celebrate the Saka new year. The name is derived from the Balinese language and means pull-pull.

The ceremony is performed to make friendships and maintain people's harmony and solidarity. This ceremony also became a meeting place for singles. Many couples have met through this tradition.

== History ==
The ceremony is thought to have existed since the 17th century.

According to a legend, after Nyepi, there is a traditional game named med-medan from the Puri Oka people (now located in southern Denpasar). In that game, male and female youths pulled each other, but over time they embraced each other. One day, Ida Bhatara Kompaing, Puri Oka's leader who was ill at the time, was annoyed by the rowdy sound from the game and tried to stop it. But, after coming out, he became healthy. He then ordered med-medan to be held every ngembak geni (relighting the fire) after Nyepi.

The Dutch East Indies government tried to ban med-medan, but the people ignored the ban. In 1984, it was ordered to stop because of complaints that young people were kissing during the ceremony. Suddenly, a fight broke out between a male and female pig that lasted for an hour. I Gusti Ngruha Oka Putra, a Pura figure, heard a person that reported to him about the fight; when he got there, the fight stopped. Because people thought it was a bad sign, it was decided that med-medan was allowed.

In the 1990s, the organizer was changed from banjar adat to sekaa teruna, and in the 2000s, the ceremony's name was changed to omed-omedan. Sesetan Heritage Omed-omedan Festival (SHOF/SHOOF) has been held since 2009.

== Performance ==
Omed-omedan involves sekaa teruna teruni (STT) or unmarried 17–30 year old youths. The participants of the ceremony consists of 40 men and 60 women. The rest will be saved for the next stage.

=== Opening ===
Omed-omedan starts with a short speech from prajuru banjar (banjar manager) that consists of kelihan banjar (to instruct the participants), kelihan dinas, and the head of the STT.

After that, the participants will pray together to invoke safety. First, the prayer leader (jero pemangku pura) offers a sesajen named banten pejati. Then, the participants will say the panca sembah. After that, the leader will sprinkle tirta amerta (the water of life) as a symbol of the blessing of Sang Hyang Widhi Wasa to his followers and offer a few grains of bija (rice that is wetted in a temple) to Him.

After the prayer, the Barong Bangkung dance will commence to remember the fighting between two pigs in the village.

=== Ceremony ===
The participants will be divided into a male group (teruna) and a female group (teruni). The groups face each other on the main street. With the signal of a Hindu leader, both sides approach the center of the road. They then face and pull each other with bare hands. They also hug and kiss each other. After a while, pecalangs will pour buckets of water over them as a signal to stop.

When the group leader passes a certain line, the phase ends, they lose, and they must give their leader to the winning group, which becomes a pacundang. The groups' place changes every second phase. This will continue until 17:00 WITA or all participants are finished.

=== Ending ===
After the ceremony is finished, the kelihan banjar will thank and disperse the inhabitants. The prajurit banjar will also apologize if there is something wrong during the ceremony. Then, all participating inhabitants and officials will eat together in Banjar Kaja Desa Pakraman Sesetan. While eating, kelihan banjar and bendesa will talk about things that can be improved and proposals to improve the next year's ceremony.
