= Ogoh-ogoh =

Religious statues used for Nyepi in Bali, Indonesia

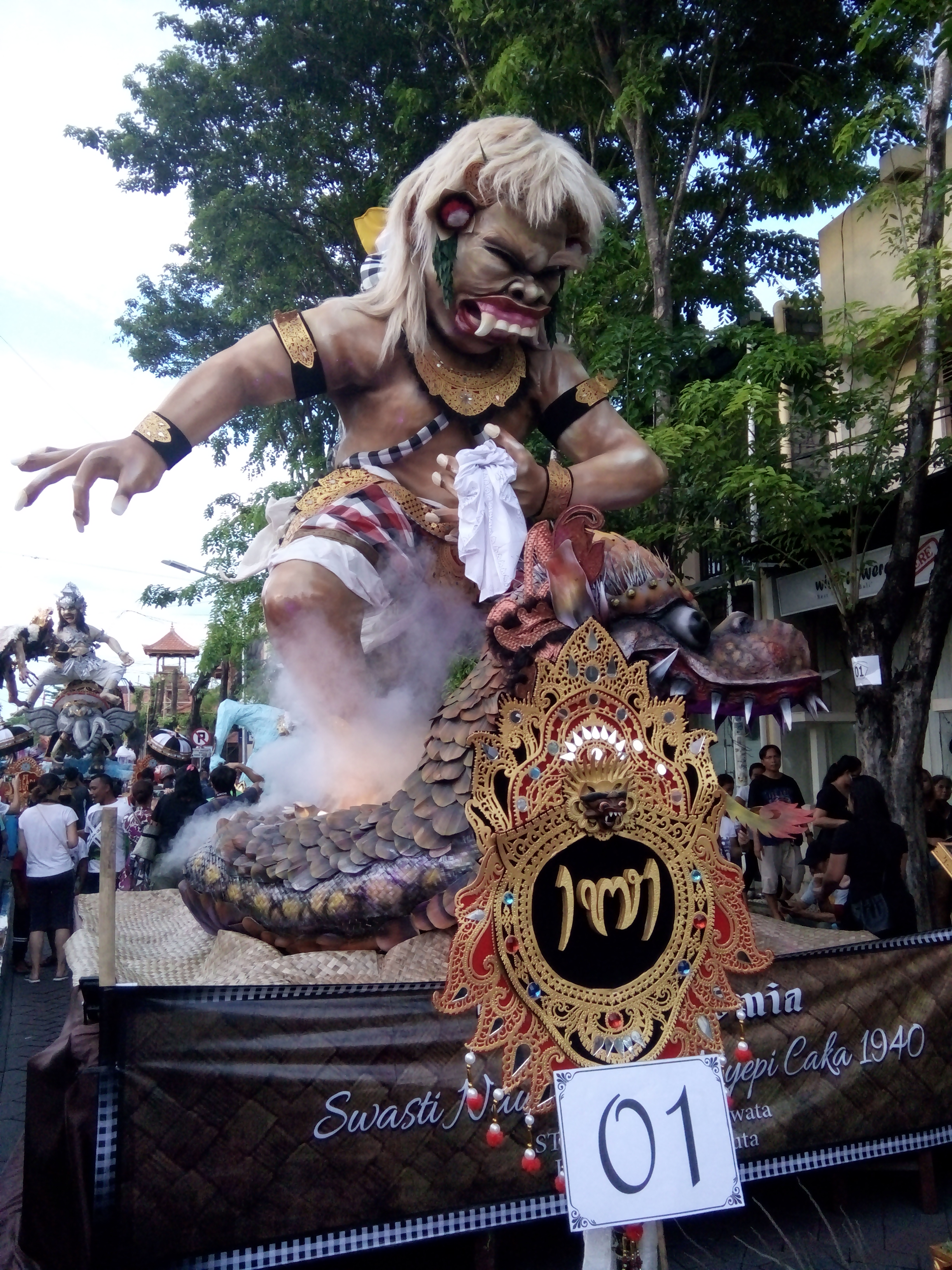
Ogoh-ogoh on display at the Cultural Arts Festival in Legian, Kuta, 2018.

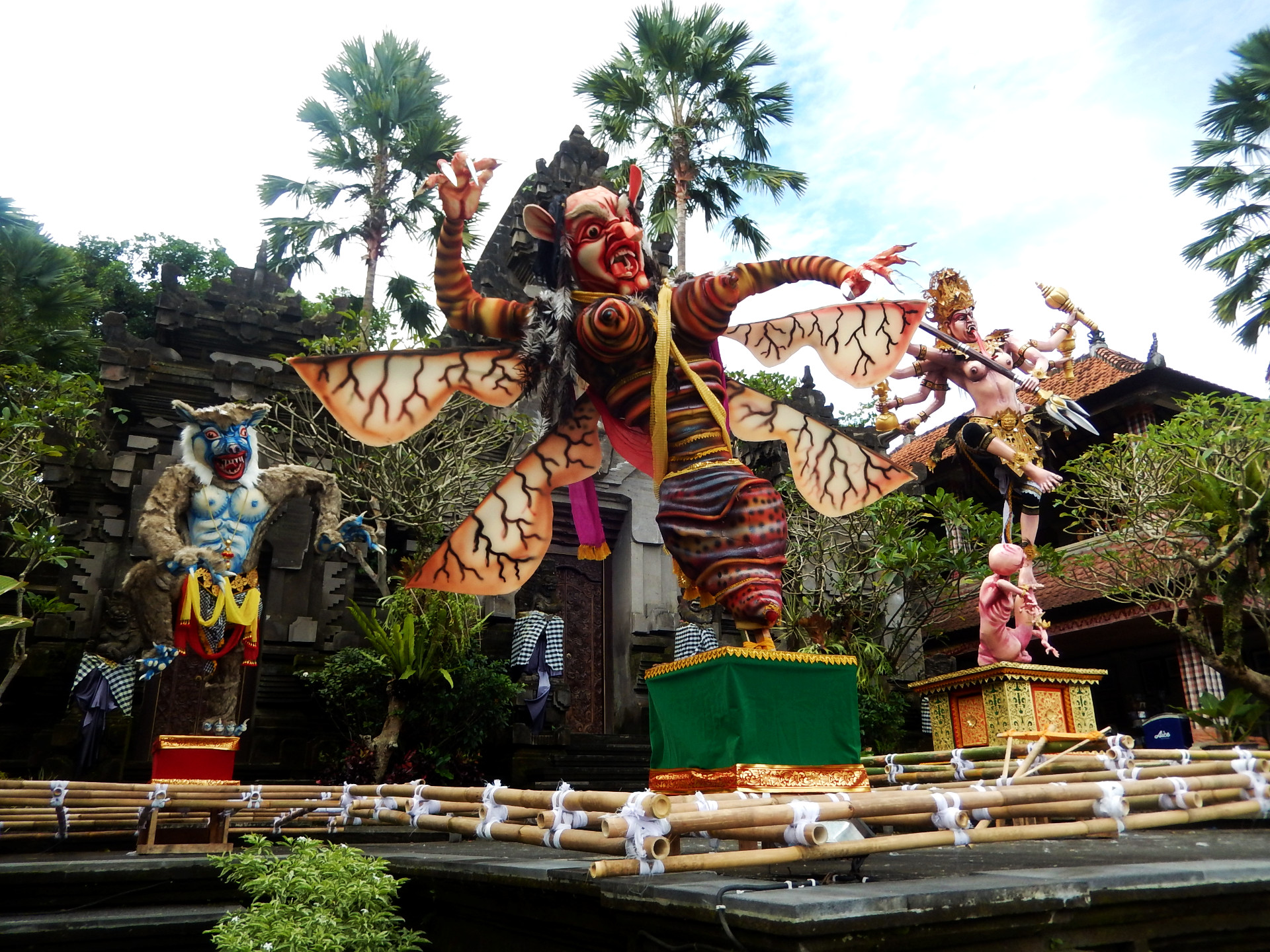
Ogoh-ogoh placed in front of Puri Lukisan Museum in Ubud.

Ogoh-ogoh (Balinese: ᬳᭀᬕᭀᬄᬳᭀᬕᭀᬄ) is a sculpture art form in Balinese culture that is typically paraded during Pangrupukan, a Hindu Balinese tradition held to welcome Nyepi (the Saka New Year). This tradition is part of the Tawur Kesanga procession, a Hindu Balinese ritual aimed at neutralizing negative forces in the surrounding environment and "appeasing" beings from the lower realms before the turn of the Saka Year. During the Pangrupukan parade, ogoh-ogoh symbolizes the evils of human nature or negativity in the universe. Therefore, after the parade ends, ogoh-ogoh is eventually burned as a representation of eliminating those negative traits. The burning usually takes place in the village cemetery field.

Ogoh-ogoh are generally made in each banjar, which is a traditional Balinese community organization, equivalent to a neighborhood association. The figure of Butakala, a supernatural being or inhabitant of the "lower realm" in Hindu beliefs, is a common theme for ogoh-ogoh and is considered to represent negative qualities within humans. However, in modern times, many ogoh-ogoh take the form of mythological animals, characters from wayang (shadow puppetry) or Hindu literature, and even Hindu gods and goddesses. Ogoh-ogoh can be made as individual figures, in pairs, or in groups. The common materials used are woven bamboo or rattan—or even styrofoam—then covered with paper. The creation process takes weeks or even months, depending on the complexity and the number of craftsmen involved.

The ogoh-ogoh tradition, as it is known today, is a relatively new cultural practice. It is estimated to have developed in the 1980s, although ogoh-ogoh had existed in earlier years in a much simpler form and was not yet widely recognized. The traditions of lelakut, pelebonan statues, and Barong Landung are believed to be the roots and early inspirations for the development of ogoh-ogoh. Today, ogoh-ogoh has become a distinctive feature of Nyepi celebrations and is frequently held as a competition at various levels across Bali almost every year.

Outside Bali, the ogoh-ogoh tradition is also practiced in regions with a significant Hindu population (especially those celebrating Nyepi), such as East Java, Lampung, West Nusa Tenggara, East Kalimantan, South Sulawesi, and others. In these areas, the ogoh-ogoh parade is seen as a symbol of interfaith harmony, with participation not limited to Hindus. Besides cities outside Bali, ogoh-ogoh has also been showcased in several cultural parades abroad.

== Etymology ==
Video of ogoh-ogoh in Kuta, Bali (2018), being shaken during the carrying.

Etymologically, "Ogoh-ogoh" comes from the Balinese language, derived from the word ogah, meaning "to shake"; ngogah, meaning "to shake something". The reduplicated form ogah-ogah means "to be shaken repeatedly". This relates to the way ogoh-ogoh is paraded, where it is shaken to create the illusion of movement and dancing. The term "ogoh-ogoh" is a relatively new native Balinese vocabulary and was not found in Balinese dictionaries compiled before 1980. The word ogoh-ogoh was first recorded in the Bali Post newspaper on 6 March 1984. In a Balinese dictionary published in 1991, ogoh-ogoh is defined as a statue made of bamboo or paper, typically depicting a butakala or giant figure. Before the term ogoh-ogoh became widely used, it was referred to as onggokan, meaning "something lifted or hoisted repeatedly (onggok-onggok)".

== History ==
=== Origins and roots of the tradition ===
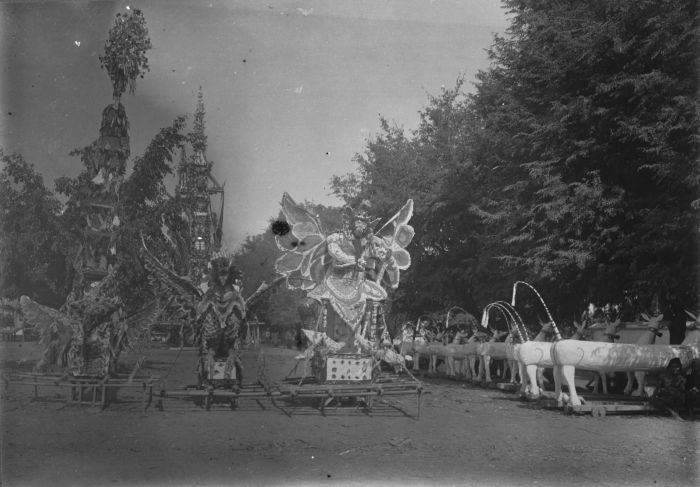
Statues paraded during the cremation (pelebonan) of Royal Palaces in Bali. Photograph from the collection of Tropenmuseum, Amsterdam (1900–1925).

The ogoh-ogoh tradition, as it is known today, is considered a relatively new cultural practice and does not originate from ancient Balinese times, though it has roots and inspiration from older traditions. The practice of creating giant statues for public processions existed before the modern ogoh-ogoh tradition. However, before the 1980s, these statues were not known by the term ogoh-ogoh, nor were they paraded for the Pangrupukan procession (the day before Nyepi). Instead, they were used in grand cremation ceremonies (pelebon) that featured Bade Awin or Pengabenan Mawangun. These ceremonies were organized by noble families of the puri (royal courts). Such statues could also be made for the cremation of Hindu priests. A historic video recorded by Canadian composer Colin McPhee captures several statues being paraded during a pelebon in Gianyar in 1933. According to cultural expert Anom Ranuara, the statues accompanying these cremations served as inspiration for modern ogoh-ogoh.

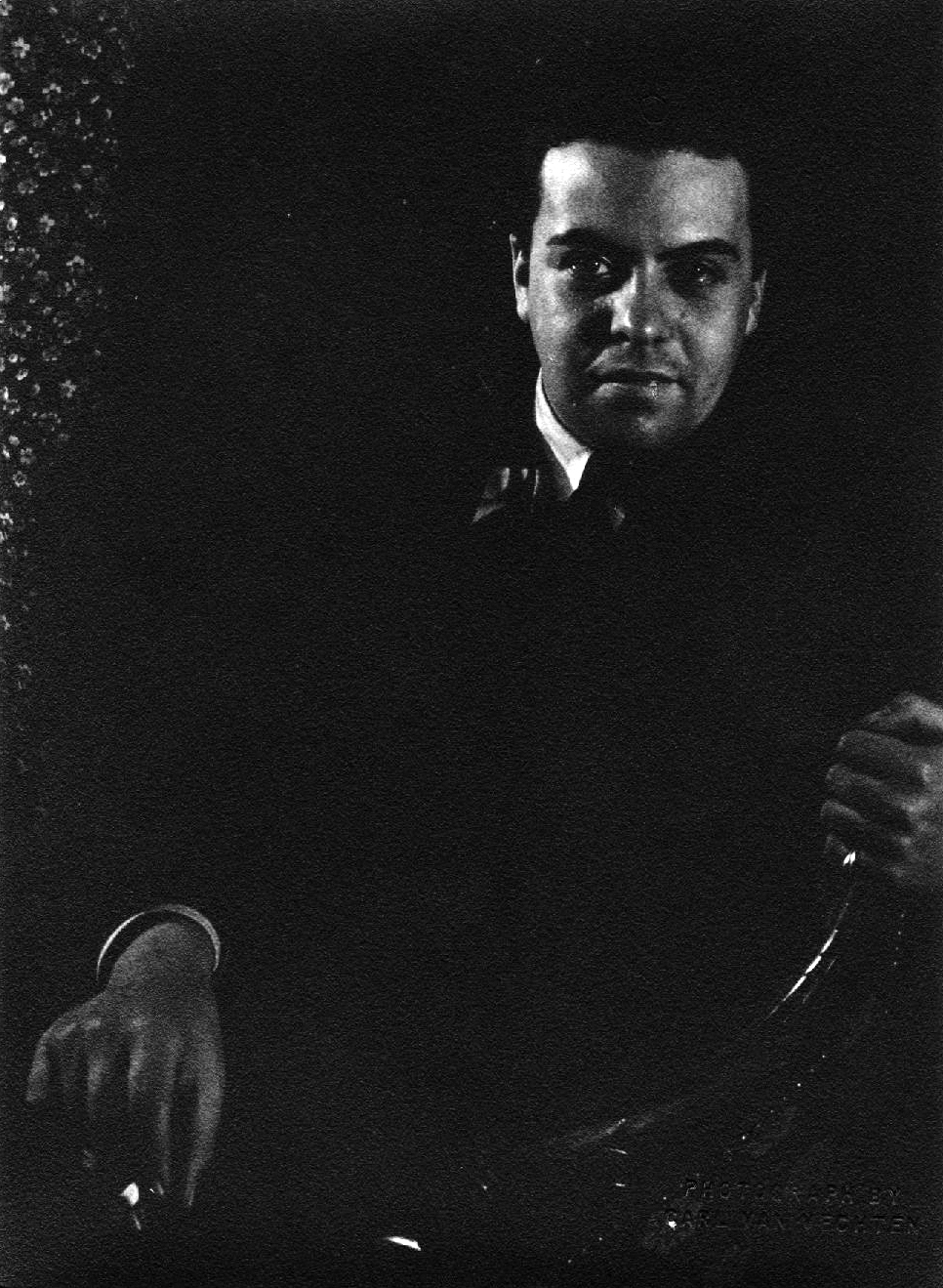
Miguel Covarrubias in 1932.

Aside from the statues carried during pelebon ceremonies, another art form featuring towering figures is Barong Landung, a giant puppet paraded in a manner similar to Ondel-ondel. This art form has been known in Balinese society since ancient times. The documentary film La Isla de Bali (1930), created by Mexican ethnologist Miguel Covarrubias, depicts Barong Landung in a pelebon ceremony in Bali. However, this Barong Landung appeared without a partner, had a giant-like face, and carried a weapon, differing from the usual Barong Landung. This tradition is believed to share similarities with ogoh-ogoh.

There is no certainty about when the tradition of parading ogoh-ogoh—as part of the Nyepi celebration—was first practiced. One hypothesis suggests that the ogoh-ogoh procession was inspired by lelakut (scarecrows) or petakut, which were used to drive birds away from rice fields. These lelakut were believed to possess magical power if their creation and placement followed guidelines found in ancient Balinese lontar manuscripts. Their primary function was to ward off pest infestations. According to cultural expert Anom Ranuara, the lelakut tradition was later adopted into statues carried during Pengabenan Mawangun cremation ceremonies, which eventually inspired the emergence of the ogoh-ogoh tradition in Pangrupukan. Another hypothesis suggests that ogoh-ogoh originated from the ngelawang tradition, a ritual in which barong figures were carried around the village to dispel negative forces.

Before the ogoh-ogoh tradition emerged, Balinese Hindus welcomed Nyepi with a series of Pangrupukan rituals performed within their villages and homes. These activities included conducting caru (ritual offerings), lighting torches or fires using dried coconut leaves, scattering aromatic spice cuttings (such as jeringau, mesoyi, and shallots), and making loud noises with instruments like kentungan (bamboo slit drums) and cengceng (cymbals). As the ogoh-ogoh tradition developed, the parade of ogoh-ogoh was added at the end of these rituals and eventually became synonymous with Pangrupukan. Several journalists and academics estimate that this tradition began to develop in the 1980s, although simpler forms of it existed earlier and were not widely recognized.

=== Early development ===
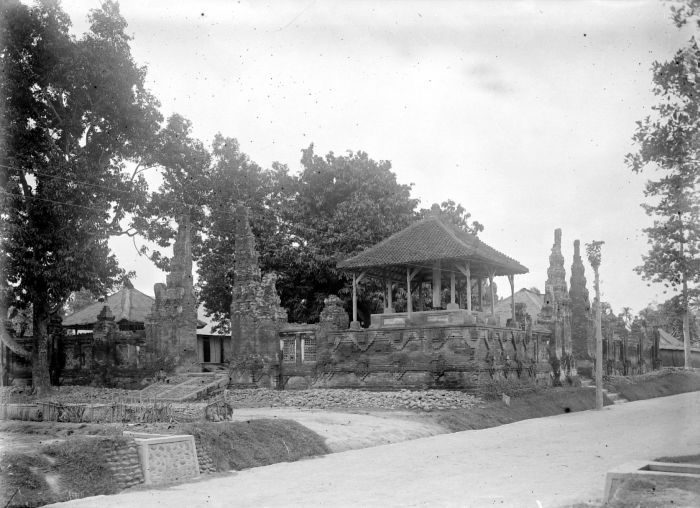
Kesiman Palace, Denpasar, 1912.

The origins of ogoh-ogoh stem from traditions practiced by several Balinese community groups (banjar, a type of neighborhood association) in preparation for Nyepi. In Denpasar, this tradition began in the Puri Kesiman area. Wayan Candra, the owner of Sanggar Gases Sesetan, estimates that ogoh-ogoh first appeared around the 1950s but only became widely recognized in the 1960s. The prototype or early form of ogoh-ogoh was a straw doll (lelakut), which was displayed at village intersections. After the Pangrupukan ritual was completed, the doll was eventually burned.

Before being known as ogoh-ogoh, the statues created to enliven Tawur Kesanga were called onggokan, meaning "something lifted repeatedly (dionggok-onggok)". This tradition originated in Banjar Kedaton, Kesiman Petilan. Onggokan was made using simple materials, such as a bamboo frame covered with newspaper and cloth, then painted in vibrant colors. Its forms were based on historical stories closely related to the Tawur ceremony during Sasih Kesanga in the Balinese calendar. Sasih Kesanga is recognized by Balinese society as the mating season for dogs, making onggokan depictions of mating dogs a popular form.

Journalist I Nyoman Suarna stated that the development of ogoh-ogoh in Denpasar was initiated by young people. In the 1970s, in East Denpasar, a group of banjar youths paraded lelakut (scarecrows) before Nyepi, inspiring other banjar communities to create something more elaborate. The following year, another group of youths crafted more representative statues, drawing inspiration from lelakut and the statues carried during royal cremation ceremonies. They called them ogoh-ogoh because they were shaken while being paraded around the village. However, their activities were initially met with opposition from the older generation. Despite this, the youths persisted in parading ogoh-ogoh, eventually attracting widespread public interest. In the years that followed, ogoh-ogoh began to appear in numerous banjar communities.

Since President Soeharto declared Nyepi a national holiday (Presidential Decree No. 3 of 1983), Bali Governor Ida Bagus Mantra encouraged the public to celebrate Nyepi by creating and parading ogoh-ogoh during the Pangrupukan ritual. In the 1980s, the ogoh-ogoh procession grew in popularity across various parts of Bali. This attracted government attention, leading to ogoh-ogoh competitions at the sub-district level. Ogoh-ogoh truly became widespread across Bali after it was officially included in the Bali Arts Festival competition in 1990.

=== The 1990s and 2000s ===
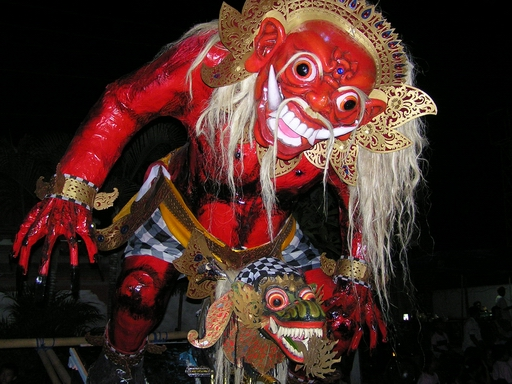
Red giant ogoh-ogoh, Denpasar, 2007.

In its development—especially during the 1990s and 2000s—many ogoh-ogoh designs drew inspiration from popular culture and contemporary issues of the time. Some were even made to resemble public figures such as celebrities, politicians, and even convicts. In more traditional competitions, ogoh-ogoh makers were indirectly required to explore Hindu and Balinese mythology as sources of inspiration. However, the creativity of the Balinese people remained under government and customary institution supervision. Authorities monitored the ogoh-ogoh created by the community and banned those deemed to contain elements of ethnicity, religion, race, and politics (SARA). During political years in the 1990s and 2000s, the ogoh-ogoh parades were sometimes prohibited by local governments. Despite this, some communities continued to create them, though in smaller numbers, believing that ogoh-ogoh was both a tradition and an outlet for artistic expression.

=== The 2010s ===
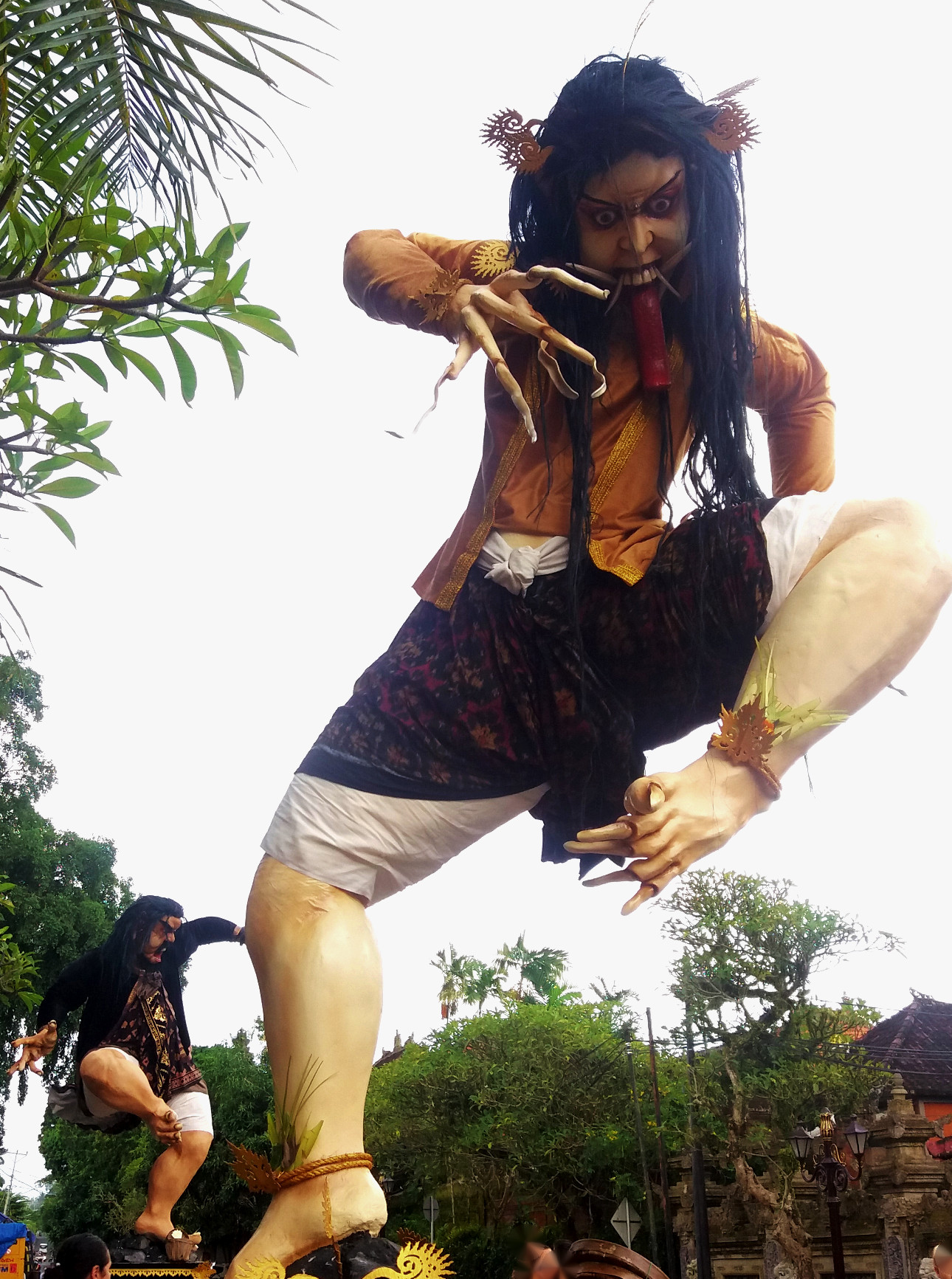
Ogoh-ogoh before pangrupukan in Ubud, 2018.

In the early 2010s, ogoh-ogoh, which were traditionally made from woven bamboo or rattan, began to be increasingly constructed from styrofoam due to its ease of use. However, for health and environmental reasons, in 2015, the Bali regional government issued a "ban" on using styrofoam in ogoh-ogoh production, and many ogoh-ogoh competitions prohibited its use. Additionally, the use of loudspeaker-based music or sound systems to accompany ogoh-ogoh parades was also banned, as it was considered inconsistent with Balinese cultural traditions. Instead, the government and customary institutions encouraged parades to continue using gamelan baleganjur, which is also commonly used to accompany traditional processions in Bali. In addition, gamelan is considered to better represent Balinese culture and enhance the taksu or charisma of the ogoh-ogoh being paraded. In the mid-2010s innovations in the ogoh-ogoh tradition were marked by the development of mechanically operated ogoh-ogoh. In 2016, a youth group in Panjer, South Denpasar, introduced a groundbreaking ogoh-ogoh that could "move" and was controlled via a smartphone using a Bluetooth system. In the following years, several banjar communities in Denpasar continued to innovate by creating machine-operated ogoh-ogoh while prioritizing eco-friendly materials. North Denpasar developed ogoh-ogoh capable of reclining and standing upright using a hydraulic system. The production process for these advanced ogoh-ogoh often required significant funding, sometimes reaching tens of millions of rupiah, and involved engineering students to implement cutting-edge technology. Banjar communities with innovative ogoh-ogoh frequently participated in city-level competitions.

As the 2019 political year approached, the regional government did not ban the creation of ogoh-ogoh in Bali but implemented regulations to ensure that no ogoh-ogoh contained political elements. Ogoh-ogoh competitions were still held that year.

=== The 2020s ===
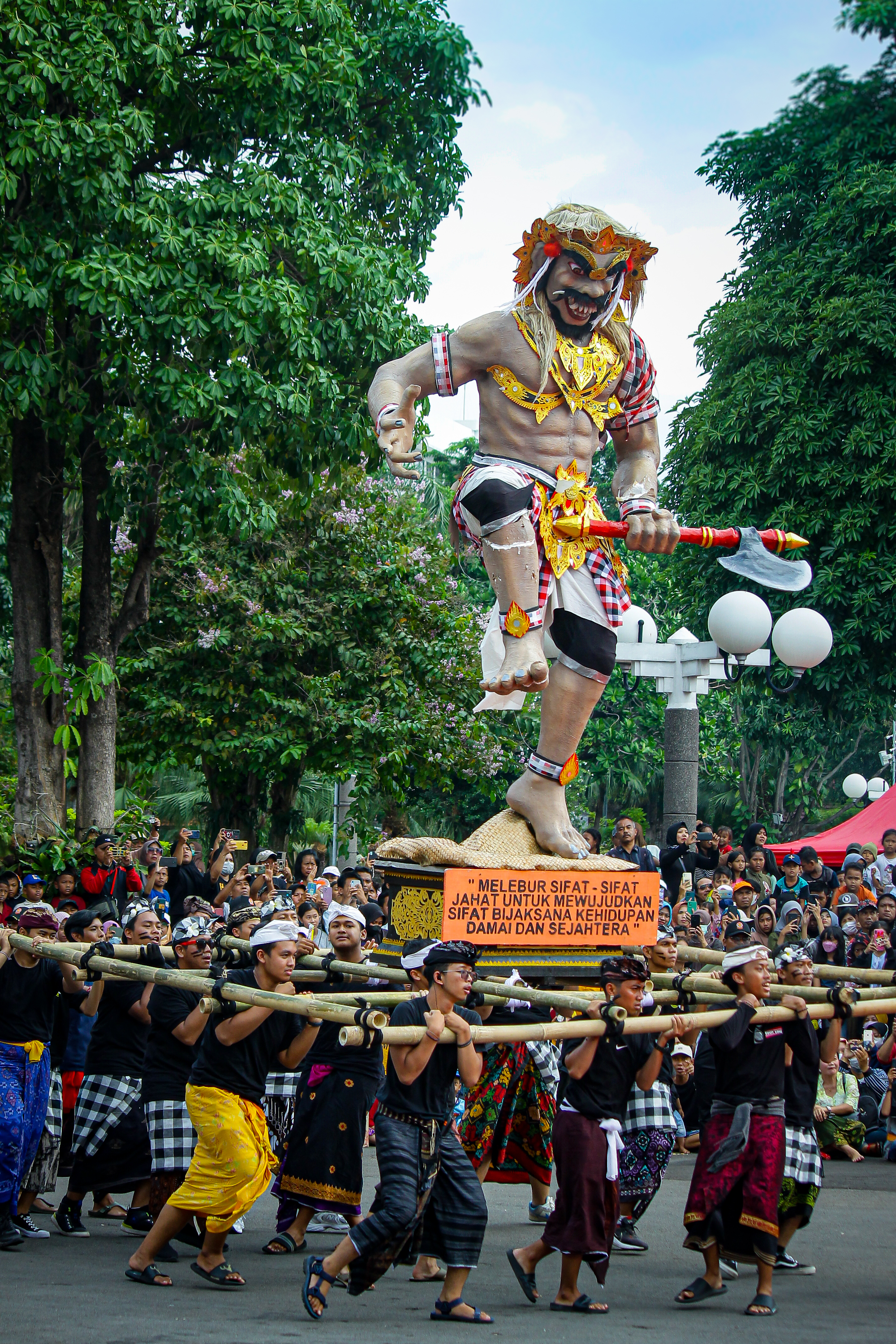
Ogoh-ogoh were paraded by the youths, 2024

Entering the 2020s, the COVID-19 pandemic spread worldwide, including in Bali. The central and regional governments issued bans on gatherings and public events, enforcing community activity restrictions in February 2020. This also impacted the ogoh-ogoh parade tradition. Ogoh-ogoh that had already been created in early 2020 (before the restrictions) were ultimately not paraded, although the rituals welcoming Nyepi were still carried out under strict limitations. In 2021, as the pandemic continued, the Parisada Hindu Dharma Indonesia, the Majelis Desa Adat, and the Bali provincial government issued a circular officially canceling ogoh-ogoh parades that year. In 2022, the Bali provincial government maintained the same ban. However, in 2023, ogoh-ogoh parades resumed, marked by the announcement of an ogoh-ogoh competition organized by the Bali Provincial Department of Culture.

Today, ogoh-ogoh are not only paraded on the eve of Nyepi but are also featured in competitions and parades during Nyepi celebration festivals. There is also the Ogoh-ogoh Museum in Mengwi, Bali, which houses several ogoh-ogoh and is managed privately.

== Creation ==
Ogoh-ogoh are made as a symbol of evil or negativity, which is paraded and burned before Hari Raya Nyepi (the Saka New Year). This tradition is part of the Tawur Kesanga ritual, one of the ceremonies leading up to Nyepi. Unlike the Melasti and Tawur Kesanga ceremonies, the ogoh-ogoh tradition is not mandatory for Nyepi celebrations; rather, it serves to enliven the ritual. Because of this, the tradition was not held in certain years, especially during political years and the COVID-19 pandemic.

In general ogoh-ogoh are created by Bali's traditional community units known as banjar, particularly by the seka teruna-teruni (STT), a division within the banjar responsible for youth activities. The creativity and financial investment put into making ogoh-ogoh often make them a source of pride and prestige for Balinese youth groups during the Nyepi celebrations. Additionally, ogoh-ogoh are also made by other communities outside the banjar, including residential neighborhood groups and seka demen (hobby-based groups).

The basic materials for ogoh-ogoh are bamboo or rattan, woven to form a frame according to the desired shape. In Bali, many ogoh-ogoh are constructed with an iron framework that serves as the "bones" to support and strengthen the structure. The woven bamboo or rattan frame is then layered with paper in several stages until it reaches the desired thickness or texture. The next step involves coating with specific materials, followed by painting. Some ogoh-ogoh are made with added fur, fibers, or other materials based on creativity. Fabrics, jewelry, and accessories are added later as final decorations.

There are also ogoh-ogoh made from Styrofoam or foam, a synthetic polystyrene product. The use of Styrofoam in ogoh-ogoh production became widespread in Denpasar around 2011 because it is easy to shape. However, since ogoh-ogoh must be burned, the smoke produced from burning Styrofoam is more hazardous to inhale compared to more natural materials. Since 2015, the local government of Bali has regulated a ban on making ogoh-ogoh from Styrofoam. After the COVID-19 pandemic, the use of organic materials—such as leaves and tree bark—has become a trend among many seka teruna-teruni (youth communities) in Bali.

The duration of making an ogoh-ogoh depends on the design, level of complexity, and workforce. Some take between one week to one month, while others take up to five months. The height of ogoh-ogoh also varies, from mini ogoh-ogoh less than one meter tall—usually displayed in stores around Denpasar before Nyepi—to those made by banjars that can reach eight meters. Meanwhile, some competitions require a maximum height of six meters. The average weight of an ogoh-ogoh also depends on its height and construction, ranging from 100 kg to 1 ton.

== Form ==
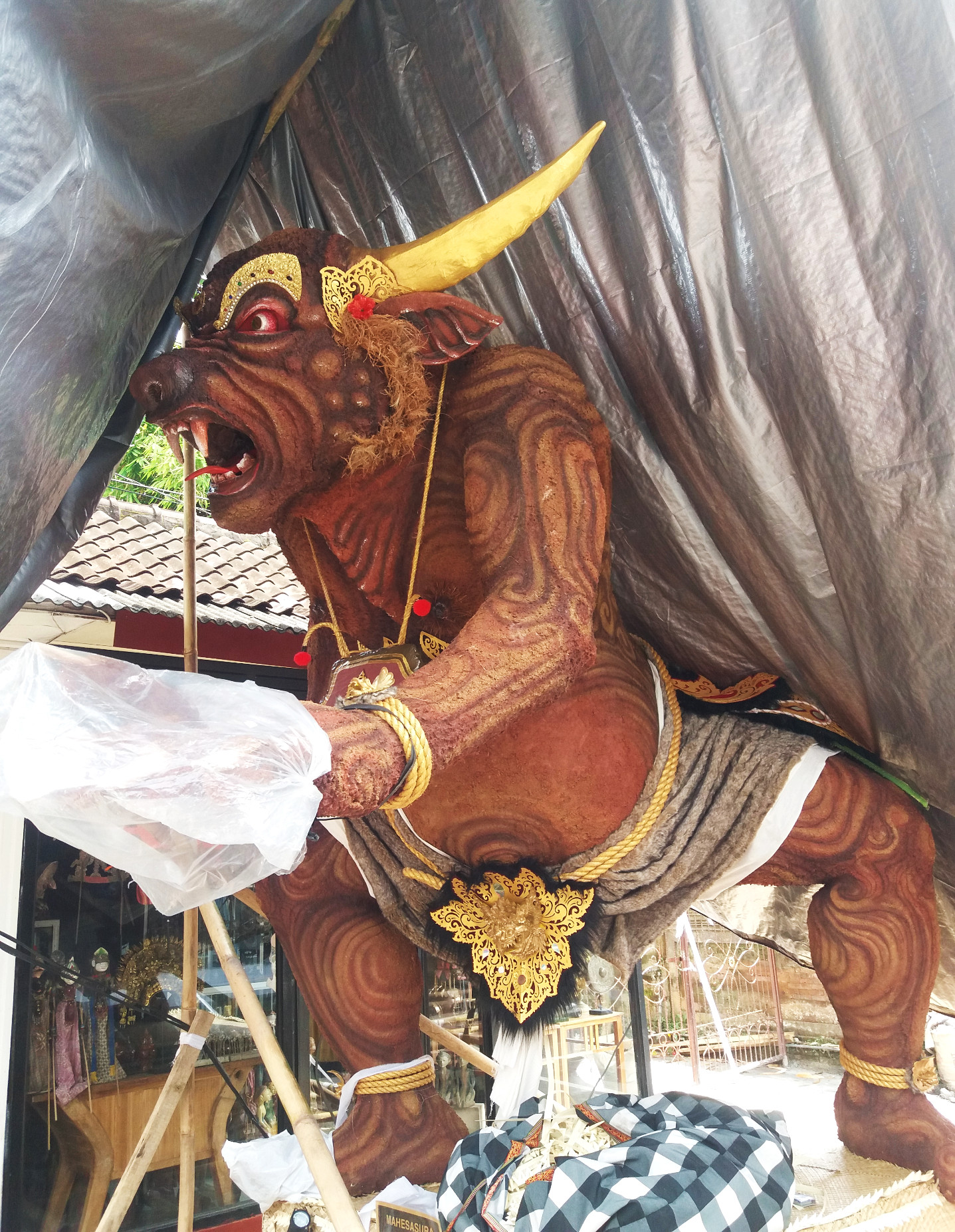
Giant horned buffalo Ogoh-ogoh, Ubud.

As its purpose suggests, ogoh-ogoh is expected to have a frightening appearance, representing negative traits (violence, wrath, evil) or adharma (wickedness, falsehood) that will be burned or destroyed. Butakala is the most common form of ogoh-ogoh, usually depicted as a large and terrifying figure, often in the form of a giant. The burning of ogoh-ogoh at the end of the Tawur Kesanga ritual symbolizes "burning away evil".

Figures resembling Hindu gods, goddesses, and avatars are associated with dharma and thus contradict the meaning of parading and burning ogoh-ogoh, which symbolizes the eradication of adharma. Likewise, noble characters from Hindu literature, such as the Pandavas and Rama, are considered unsuitable for ogoh-ogoh since they are not representations of evil, making their depiction inconsistent with the tradition's original purpose.

As time progresses and creativity flourishes, ogoh-ogoh is no longer limited to symbols of adharma or demons. In addition to giant figures, ogoh-ogoh often depict creatures from different realms—earth, swarga (heaven), and naraka (hell). These include mythological animals (such as nagas, garudas, and makaras), supernatural beings (like detya, wanara, and celestial nymphs), characters from Javanese-Hindu epics (Ramayana, Mahabharata, Calon Arang), and even Hindu deities.

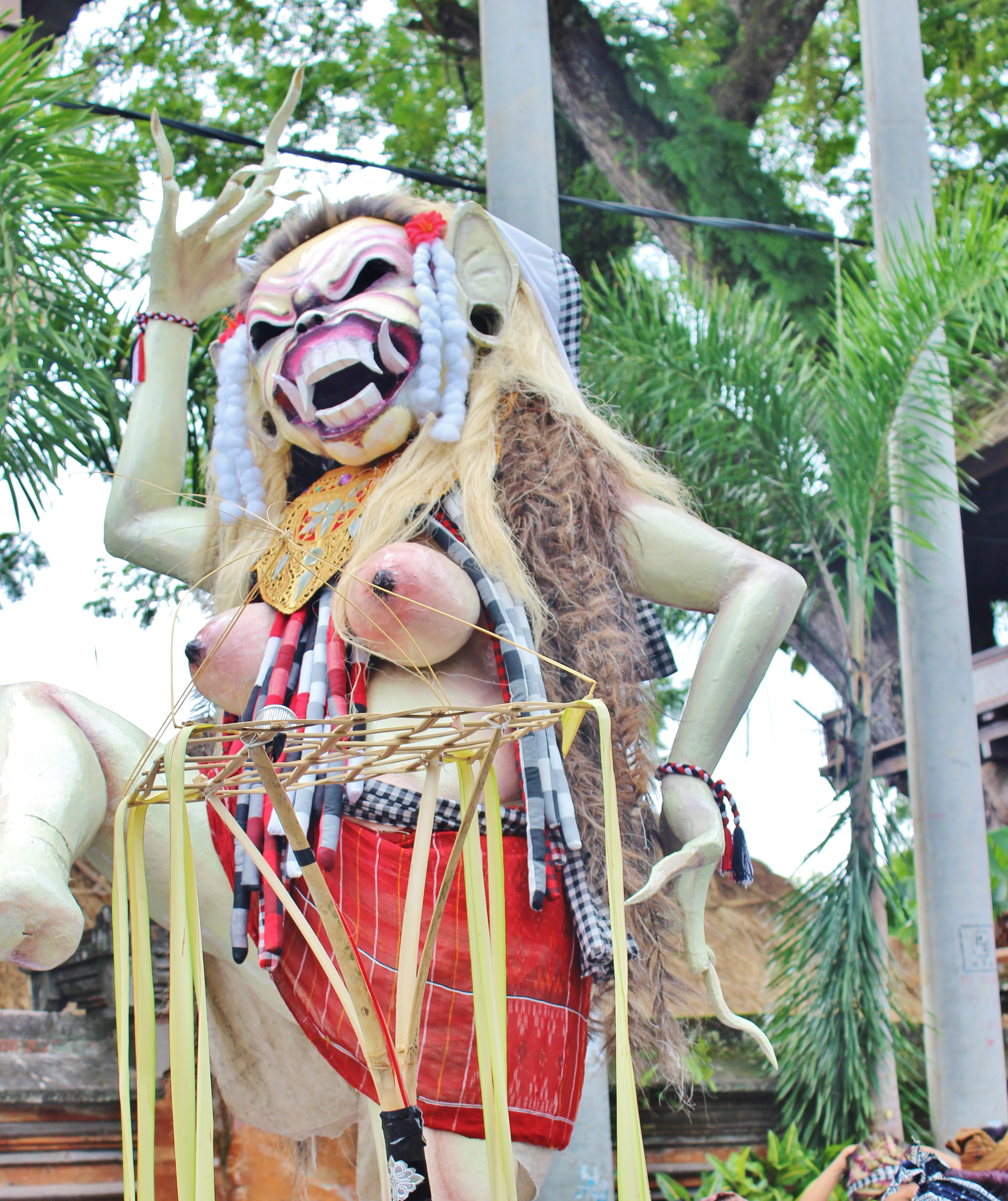
Ogoh ogoh celuluk (mythological creatures from Balinese folklore), Ubud.

In the 1990s and 2000s, many ogoh-ogoh were inspired by public figures, celebrities, and contemporary issues of the time. However, traditional forms, such as creatures from Hindu mythology or Balinese folklore, were more recommended and encouraged by conservative religious and cultural institutions.

=== Public opinion medium ===
With the evolution of time and societal dynamics, ogoh-ogoh has become a form of artistic expression used to channel aspirations or public opinions. It is also considered a medium for conveying social criticism. For example, during the heated debate over the Benoa Bay reclamation issue in Bali in 2016, a group of people created an ogoh-ogoh to highlight environmental concerns. National issues such as fuel price hikes and corruption cases have also inspired ogoh-ogoh creations. Additionally, ogoh-ogoh has been used as satire against public figures or politicians involved in scandals. However, the Balinese local government, customary institutions, and law enforcement authorities generally prohibit the creation or procession of ogoh-ogoh deemed to contain elements of SARA (ethnicity, religion, race, and inter-group issue) or political content.

== Procession ==
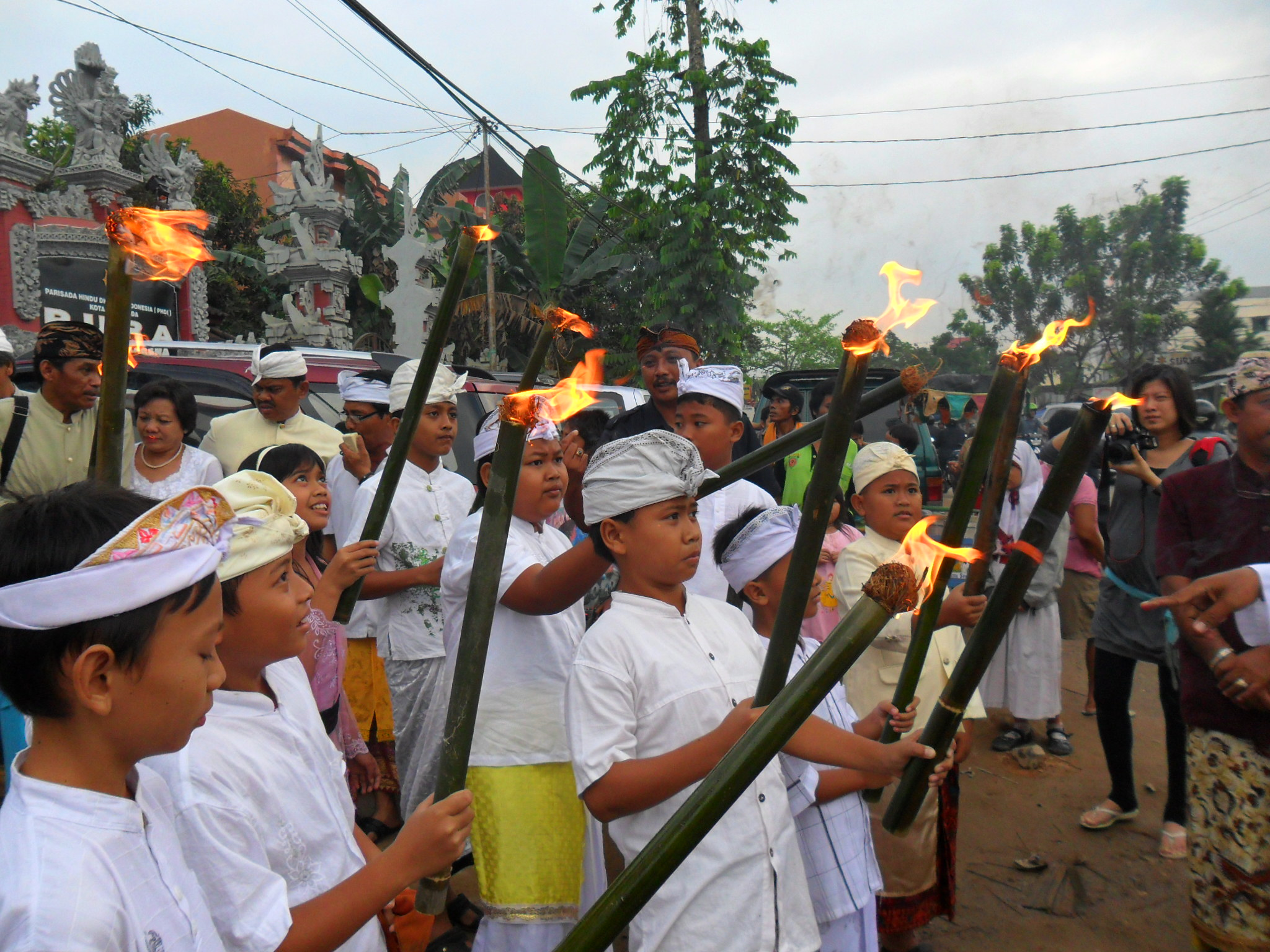
Pangrupukan performed by the Hindu Balinese community in Samarinda.

The Saka New Year or Nyepi Day is celebrated by Balinese Hindus after the new moon during the ninth month (Sasih Kesanga) of the Balinese calendar. Leading up to Nyepi, Balinese Hindus perform the Melasti ritual for spiritual purification of themselves and their surroundings. A day before Nyepi, they conduct the Tawur Kesanga ceremony, which includes Mecaru (Pecaruan) or Bhuta Yadnya as part of the ritual.

At dusk after the Mecaru ritual, Balinese Hindus perform Pangrupukan. This activity is marked by lighting torches or burning dried coconut leaves (in Balinese: mebuu-buu) and making loud noises using instruments like kentungan, tawa-tawa, cengceng, or other musical alternatives while walking around their homes or villages. The purpose is to drive away evil forces or negative influences from the surroundings. Pangrupukan is often accompanied by the ogoh-ogoh parade, representing the negative traits within humans, embodied as butakala (malevolent beings). The ogoh-ogoh are then burned as a symbolic act of destroying these negative traits. This procession is comparable to exorcism from a Western cultural perspective.

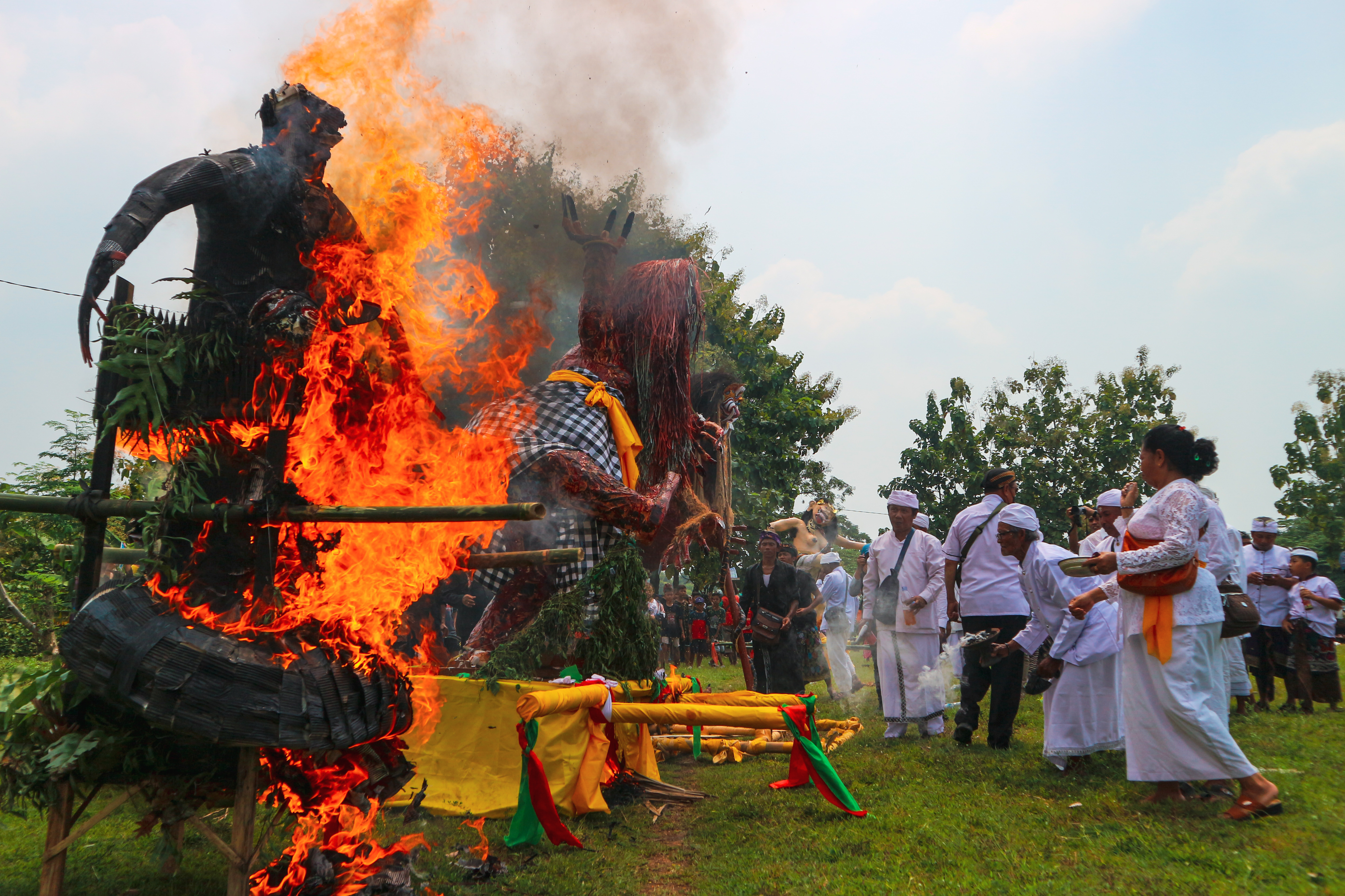
Burning of ogoh-ogoh after the parade.

=== Meaning and philosophy ===
Balinese Hindus believe that the procession carried out during Tawur Kesanga is a form of "nyomya butakala", an activity to neutralize or eliminate negative traits in nature so that they transform into positive ones and their power can be beneficial for human and environmental well-being. According to Balinese Hindu teachings, this procession symbolizes human awareness of the immense power of the universe and time. This power includes the forces of Bhuana Agung (the macrocosm) and Bhuana Alit (the microcosm or the self). In the perspective of tattwa (philosophy), these forces can lead living beings—especially humans—and the entire world toward either happiness or destruction, depending on the dominant influences they choose. The burning of ogoh-ogoh at the end of the Tawur Kesanga procession is a modern tradition, symbolizing the destruction of negative traits or the neutralization of negative energies in the surrounding environment.

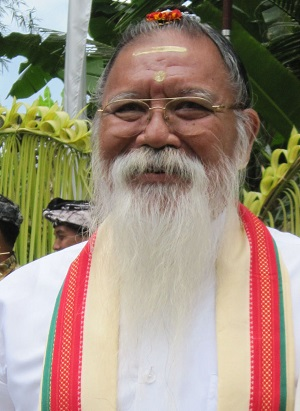
Hindu figure Ida Pedanda Gede Made Gunung once stated that the ogoh-ogoh parade after Tawur Kesanga is a "misconception" because the butakala has already been "pacified".

However, Hindu religious leader Ida Pedanda Gede Made Gunung considered the procession of ogoh-ogoh at the end of Tawur Kesanga to be a misconception. He stated that by the end of the Tawur Kesanga ritual, butakala had already been "pacified" so that it would no longer disturb human life and its surroundings. Therefore, the ogoh-ogoh procession was seen as "reawakening" butakala and parading it around. Other Hindu figures asserted that ogoh-ogoh had no connection to the Tawur Kesanga ritual and merely served as a festive element in welcoming Nyepi. The reason is that ogoh-ogoh is a repeated tradition without a basis in religious scriptures, whereas the Tawur Kesanga ritual has guidelines or instructions derived from sacred texts.

== Outside Bali ==
Ogoh-ogoh#Gallery

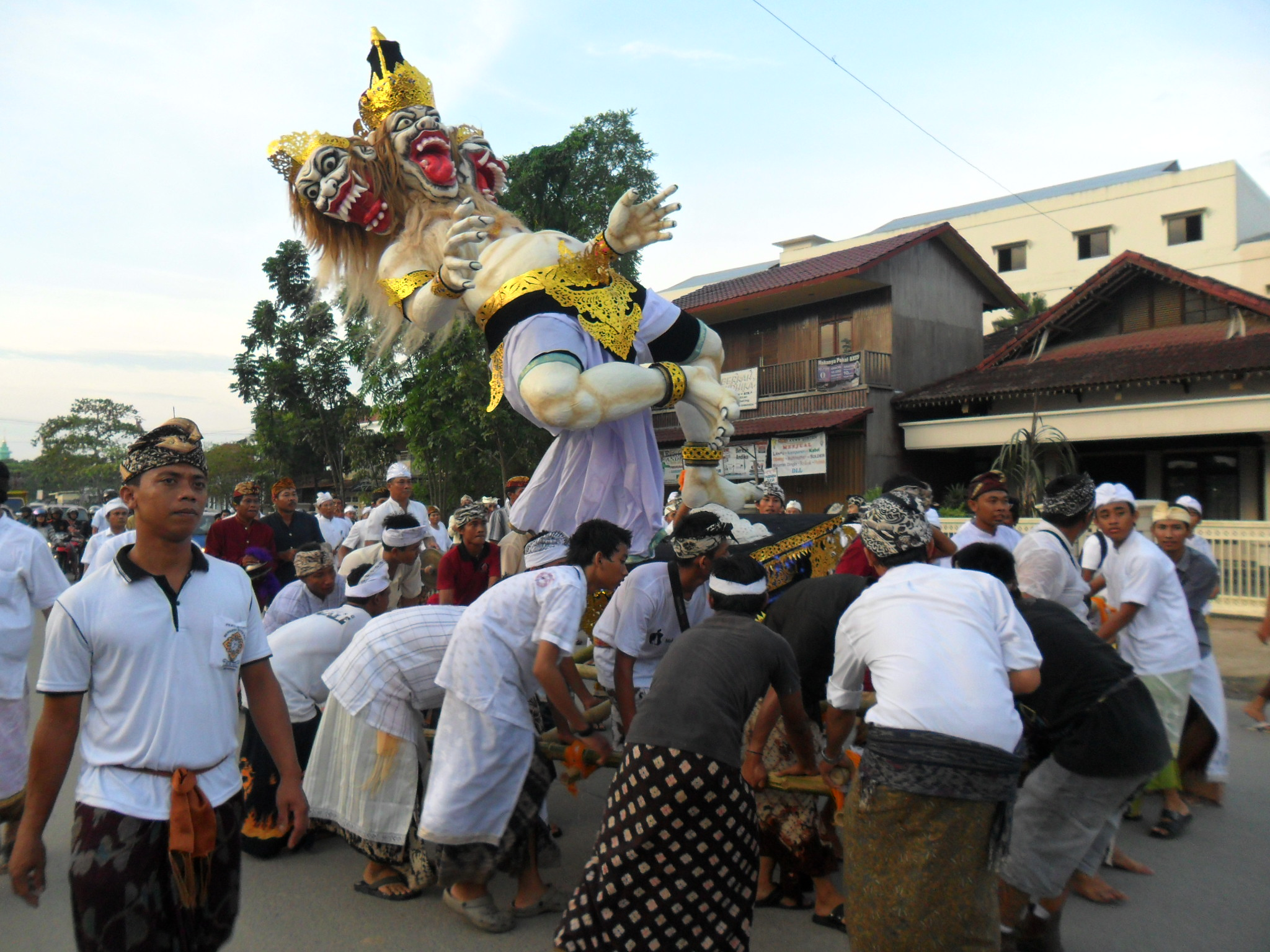
Ogoh-ogoh are paraded by Hindu community in Samarinda.

The tradition of parading ogoh-ogoh before Nyepi is also found outside Bali, following the spread of the Balinese diaspora to various regions in Indonesia, such as West Nusa Tenggara, Lampung, East Kalimantan, South Sulawesi, and others. In areas with a significant Hindu population, such as Lombok Island, the ogoh-ogoh parade represents religious harmony between the Balinese Hindu and Sasak Muslim communities. They collaborate in making and parading the ogoh-ogoh. The accompanying music also incorporates local art forms, such as the Sasak Ale-Ale gamelan.

In several regions with Hindu communities outside the Balinese ethnic group, such as Central Java and East Java, Balinese Hindu religious practices serve as a "model" for other Hindus in Indonesia, with Bali regarded as a place for preserving Javanese Hindu civilization, including the Saka calendar, which originally came from India and was later adapted in Java. Javanese Hindus also celebrate the Saka New Year (Nyepi) just like Balinese Hindus, and the ogoh-ogoh tradition has been adapted as part of the rituals welcoming Nyepi. The courtyard of Prambanan Temple in Yogyakarta serves as the location for the ogoh-ogoh parade by Javanese Hindus each year during Nyepi. In other places, such as Lamongan Regency, the ogoh-ogoh tradition began to be adopted in the 2010s, even though Nyepi celebrations had previously been conducted without ogoh-ogoh.

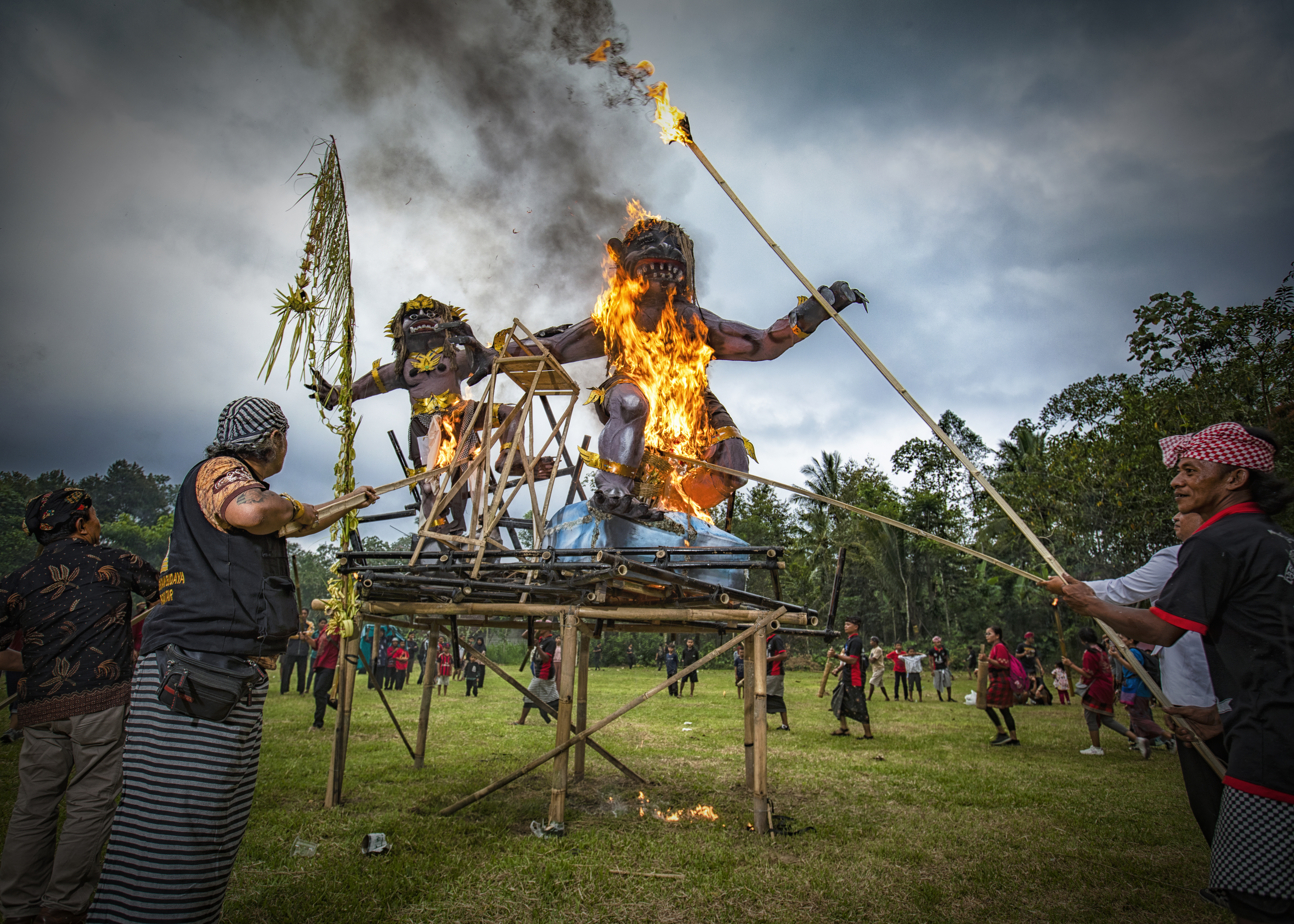
Burning of Ogoh-ogoh after the parade in Blitar Regency, East Java.

On several occasions, Balinese Hindu expatriates in Brussels, Belgium, have also organized ogoh-ogoh parades to celebrate Nyepi. This event receives support from the local government and is conducted in collaboration with the Indonesian embassy. The parade aims to accommodate the religious needs of Indonesian Balinese citizens in Belgium while also attracting tourists.

=== Outside the context of Nyepi ===
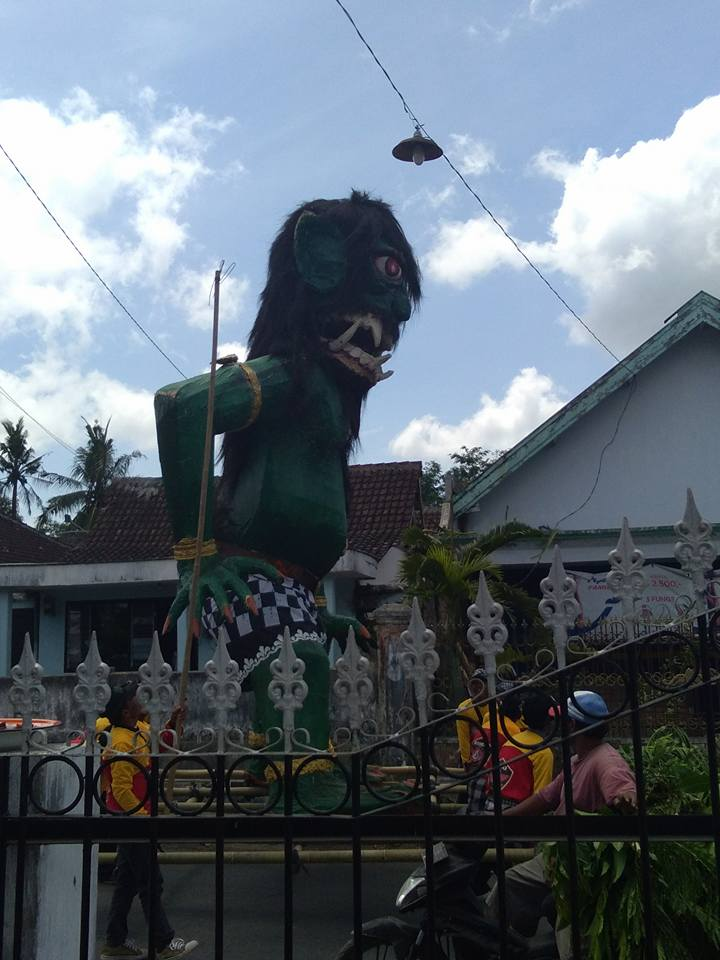
Ogoh-ogoh made to commemorate the Independence Day of the Republic of Indonesia, Lumajang Regency.

The term "ogoh-ogoh" is also used for large-scale artistic representations of creatures, even when not related to Balinese Hindu culture. Outside Bali, giant statues paraded during carnivals are also called ogoh-ogoh. Ogoh-ogoh have been featured in cultural parades in various cities in Indonesia, including Jakarta, Medan, Palembang, Semarang, Mataram, Ambon, and Jayapura. These ogoh-ogoh are presented outside the context of welcoming the Saka New Year (Nyepi) and are purely secular, regarded as works of art or entertainment.

Ogoh-ogoh have also been paraded and burned in public spaces as a form of protest outside Bali, such as demonstrations against mining activities or allegations of election fraud. These ogoh-ogoh are created solely as "effigy protests" and not as artistic works with public opinion elements prepared for Nyepi.

Outside Indonesia ogoh-ogoh as part of carnivals or cultural exhibitions has been held in several cities, including: The Hague (Netherlands) as a participant in the 2015 Tong Tong Fair; Tokyo (Japan) as part of the Indonesian cultural parade in the 2022 Kesennuma Festival; and several appearances in contemporary-themed carnivals at the Dark Mofo Festival in Tasmania, Australia.

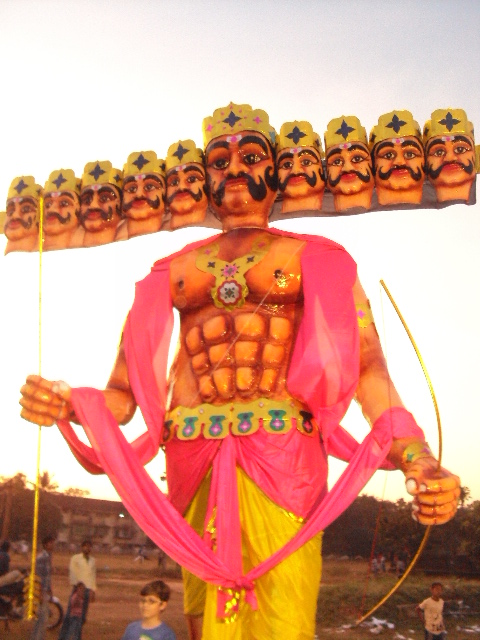
Ravana effigy resembles an ogoh-ogoh during the Vijayadashami celebration in New Delhi, India.

The distinctive characteristics of ogoh-ogoh have led netizens to compare it with other traditions involving giant effigies. One example is the Vijayadashami festival (Hindi-Urdu: Dassahra; alternative spelling: Dussehra) celebrated by Hindus in India. Unlike Nyepi, this festival is not a New Year celebration but a commemoration of Rama's victory over Ravana as told in the Ramayana epic. The festival culminates in the burning of effigies of figures considered symbols of evil, similar to the ogoh-ogoh tradition.

== Gallery ==
Outside Bali

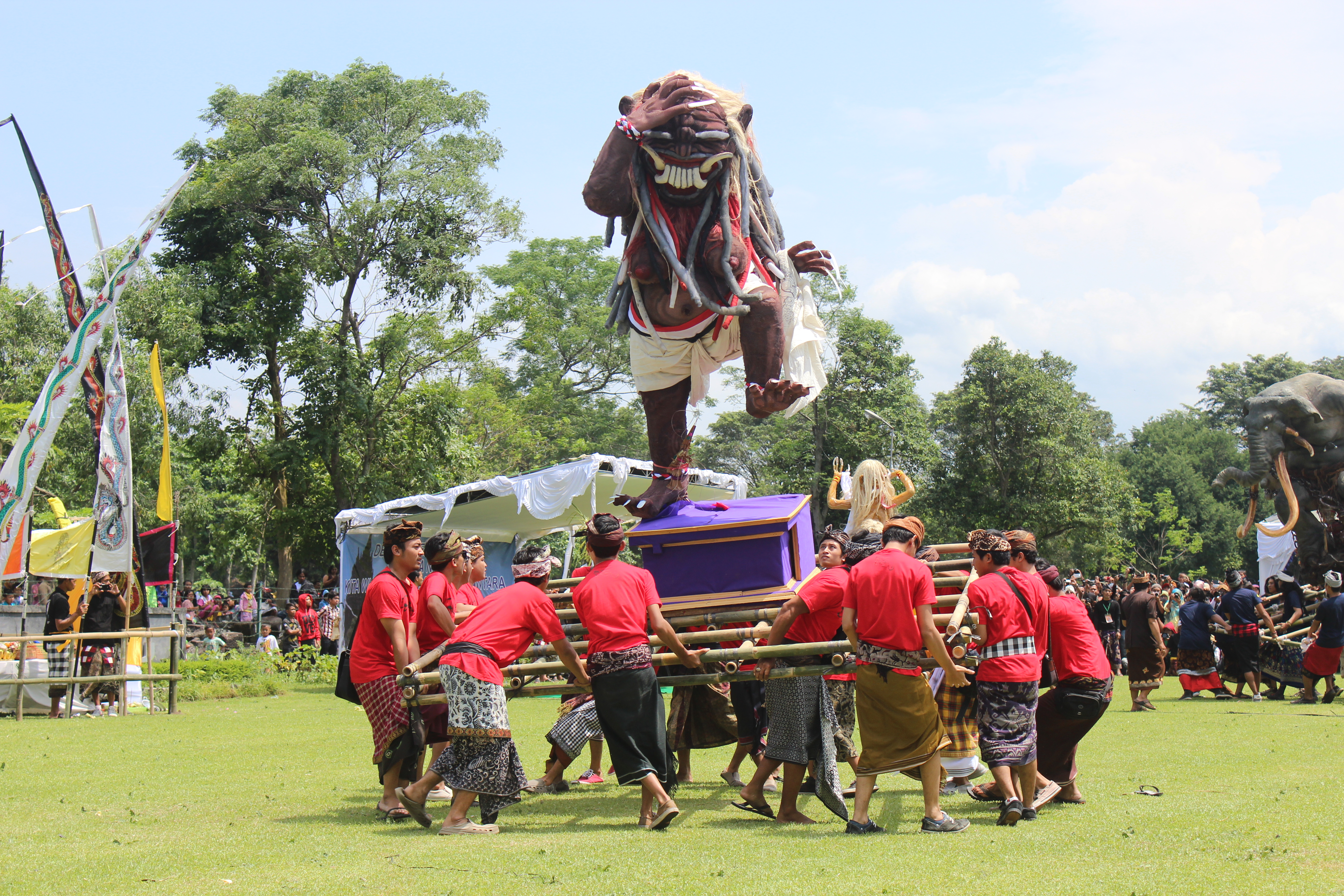
Ogoh-ogoh paraded by Hindus in the courtyard of Prambanan Temple.

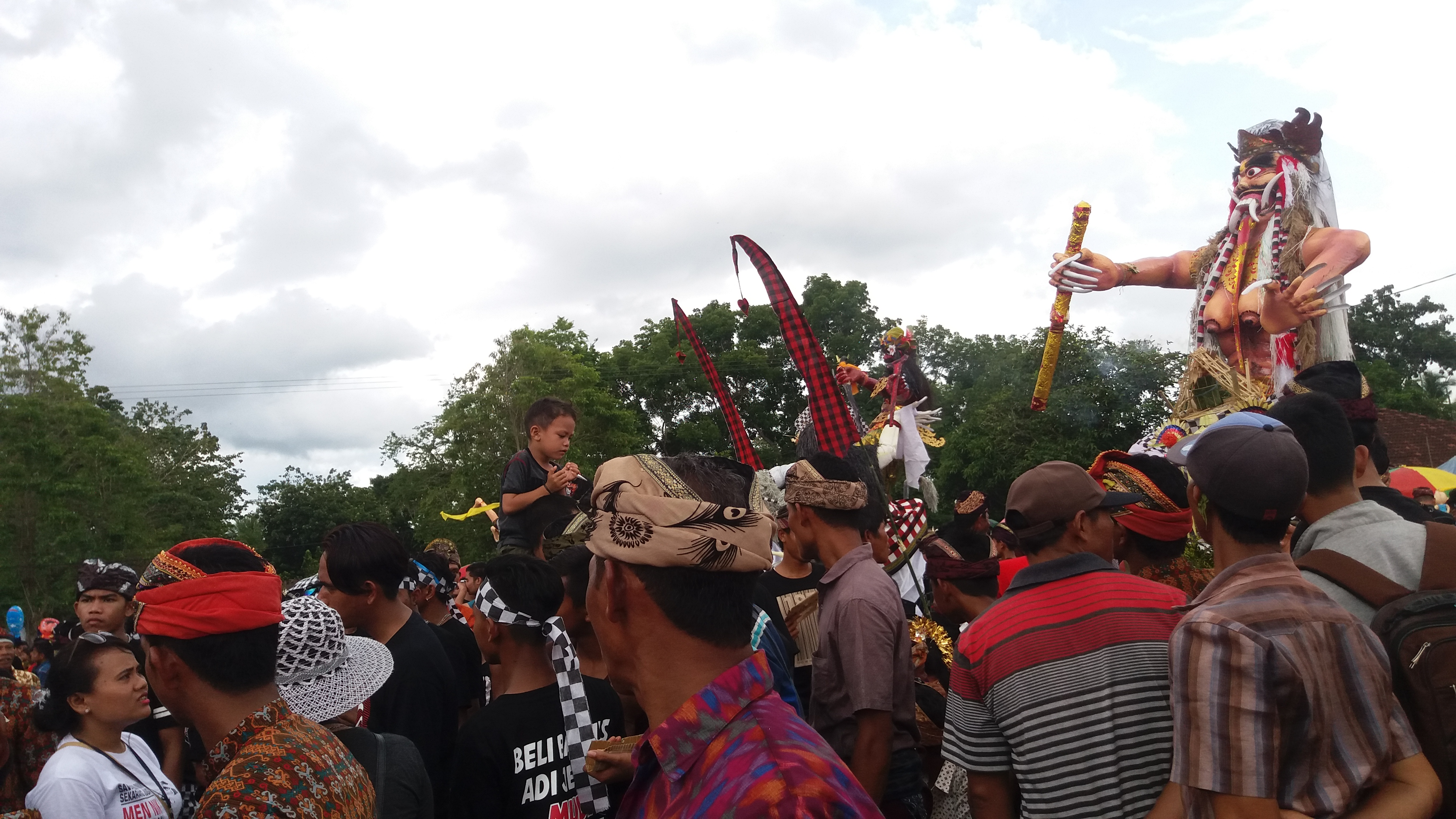
Ogoh-ogoh parade by Hindu community in East Kolaka before Nyepi.

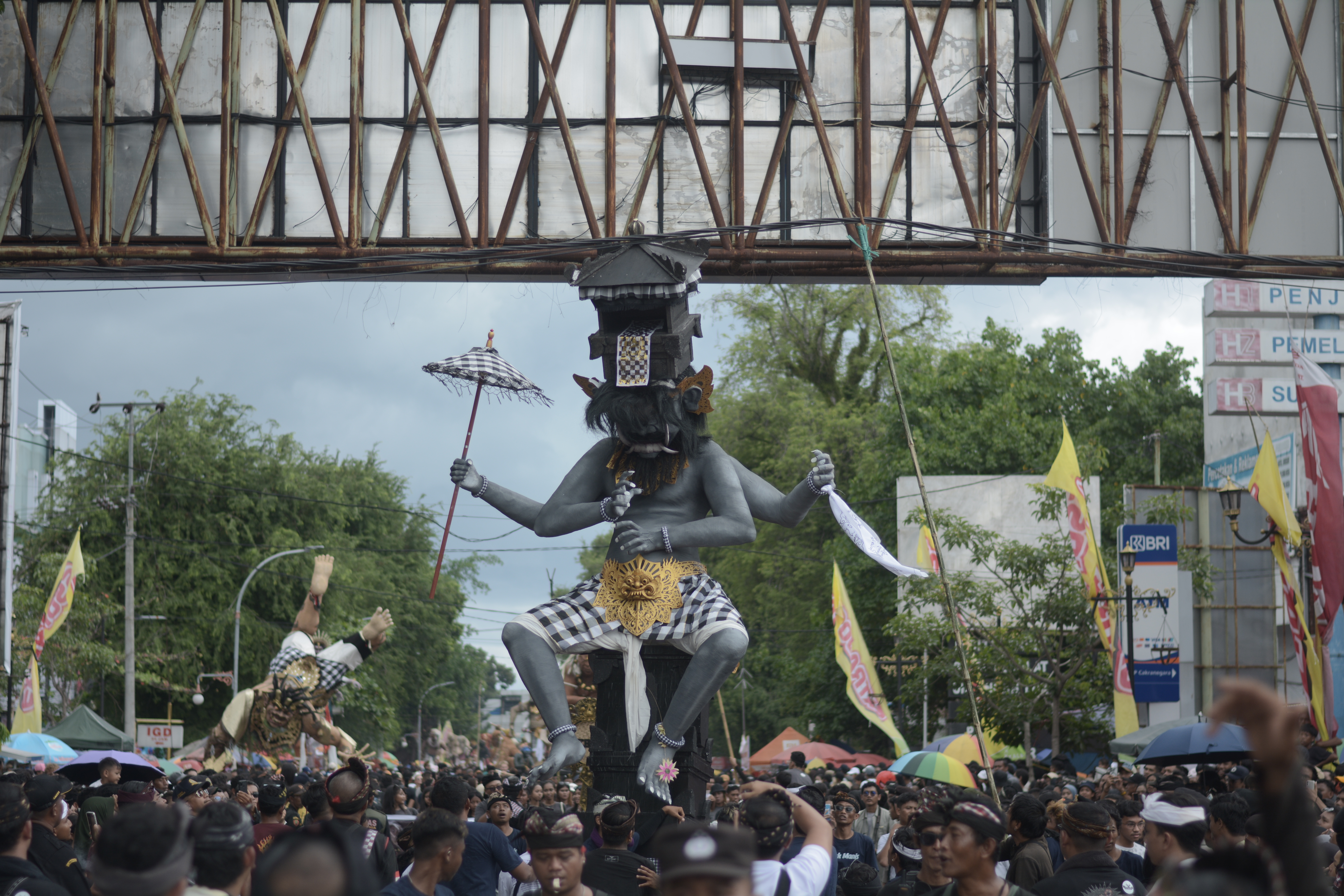
Ogoh-ogoh parade held on the Lombok Island, West Nusa Tenggara.

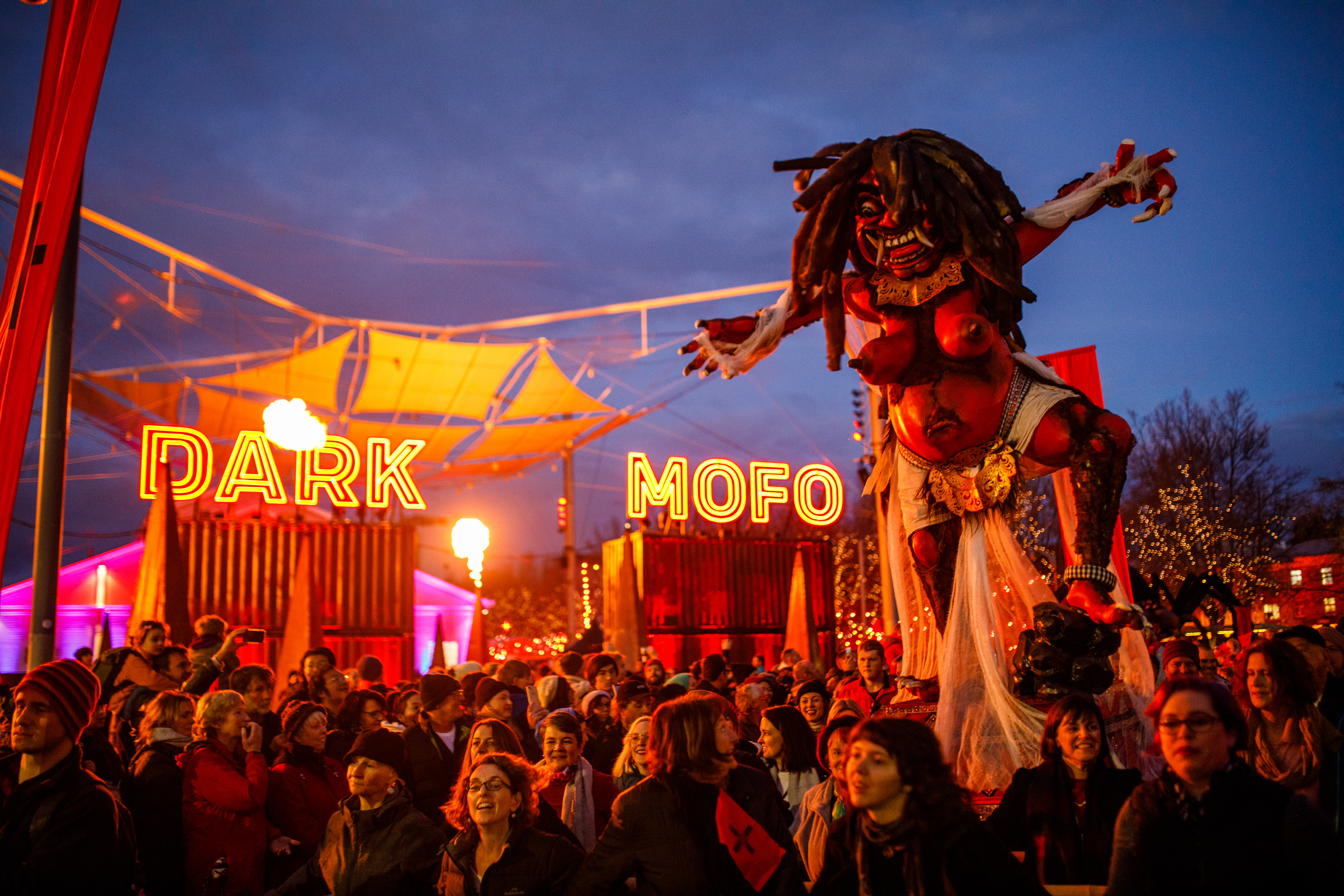
Ogoh-ogoh at the Dark Mofo Festival in Tasmania, Australia.

== See also ==
- Nyepi – Balinese Hindu day of silence (celebrated every Saka New Year)
- Pangrupukan – Balinese Hindu ceremony the day before Nyepi
- Butakala – Supernatural spirits according to ancient culture and literature in the Indies
