= Saparan Bekakak =

Festival in Indonesia

Saparan Bekakak is a festival held in Ambarketawang. The ceremony started as a sacrifice to the guardians of Mount Gamping, a celebration of Kyai Wirasuta, and a show of loyality to Sultan Hamengkubuwono I. Saparan Bekakak uses statues called ogoh-ogoh to represent the guardians of Mount Gamping.

== Background ==
Saparan Bekakak is held in Ambarketawang. The term bekakak is used to refer to the victim of animal or human slaughter, which is practiced in Saparan Bekakak with rice flour wedding dolls. Saparan Bekakak is a ceremony divided into several stages, beginning with the midodareni stage and ending with the sugengan ageng.

Before the ceremony begins, two bekakak brides are made from sticky rice filled with brown sugar that is meant to represent the blood of the doll. After that, the two brides are decorated to represent the peace between Surakarta and Yogyakarta. It is believed that the night before the wedding, an angel will come to bless the bekakak bride, and people are supposed to be present to honor the arrival of the angels. The next day, the bekakak bride is slaughtered.

After the ceremonies, a parade is held with two bekakak brides and offerings around Mount Gamping. The bekakak brides are then brought to the base of Mount Gamping, after which they are slaughtered. After these events, the sugengan ageng or slametan stage begins, which serves as a pledge of loyalty to Sultan Hamengkubuwono I. There is also a large statue, called an ogoh-ogoh, displayed, which is meant to represent as the guardian of Mount Gamping. Attempts to achieve virality have led to actions that go against the customs, such as some dancing in an erotic way. Those who are determined to have violated the norms of the community receive fines or a barring from participating the following year's Saparan Bekakak.

Saparan Bekakak was followed by thousands of Muslims and prayers from the Quran are chanted during it. A Dutch Newspaper in 1933 accused Saparan Bekakak of being animistic. There are people today who believe Saparan Bekakak is polytheist. A study found that Ambarketawang native tend to enjoy Saparan Bekakak, while Muslim migrants to the region tend to dislike the celebration.

== History ==
Saparan Bekakak started as a sacrifice to appease the guardians of Mount Gamping who, due to mining in the region, were angry. An accident happened with the procession of Saparan Bekakak in 1894. After the death of the person responsible for this accident, the village believed that the guardians of Mount Gamping were angered that the 1894 Saparan Bekakak had not been as large as it was previously. In addition to asking the guardians of Mount Gamping for permission to mine, the following year's Saparan Bekakak was held to calm the guardians.

The story of Kyai Wirasuta, who was one of Sultan Hamengkubuwono I's favorite servants and died in a landslide in Mount Gamping, also started Saparan Bekakak. Wirasuta's spirit is believed to be in Mount Gamping. Saparan Bekakak became a celebration of Wirasuta and a display of loyalty to Sultan Hamengkubuwono I. Saparan Bekakak later became a slametan. According to Wahyu Saktiaji, the chairman of the Kirab Saparan Bekakak 2025 organizing committee, Saparan Bekakak began in 1756. Saparan Bekakak was named a piece of " Intangible Cultural Heritage" by the Indonesian Ministry of Education and Culture in 2015.
