= Nyepi =

Hindu day of silence in Bali, Indonesia

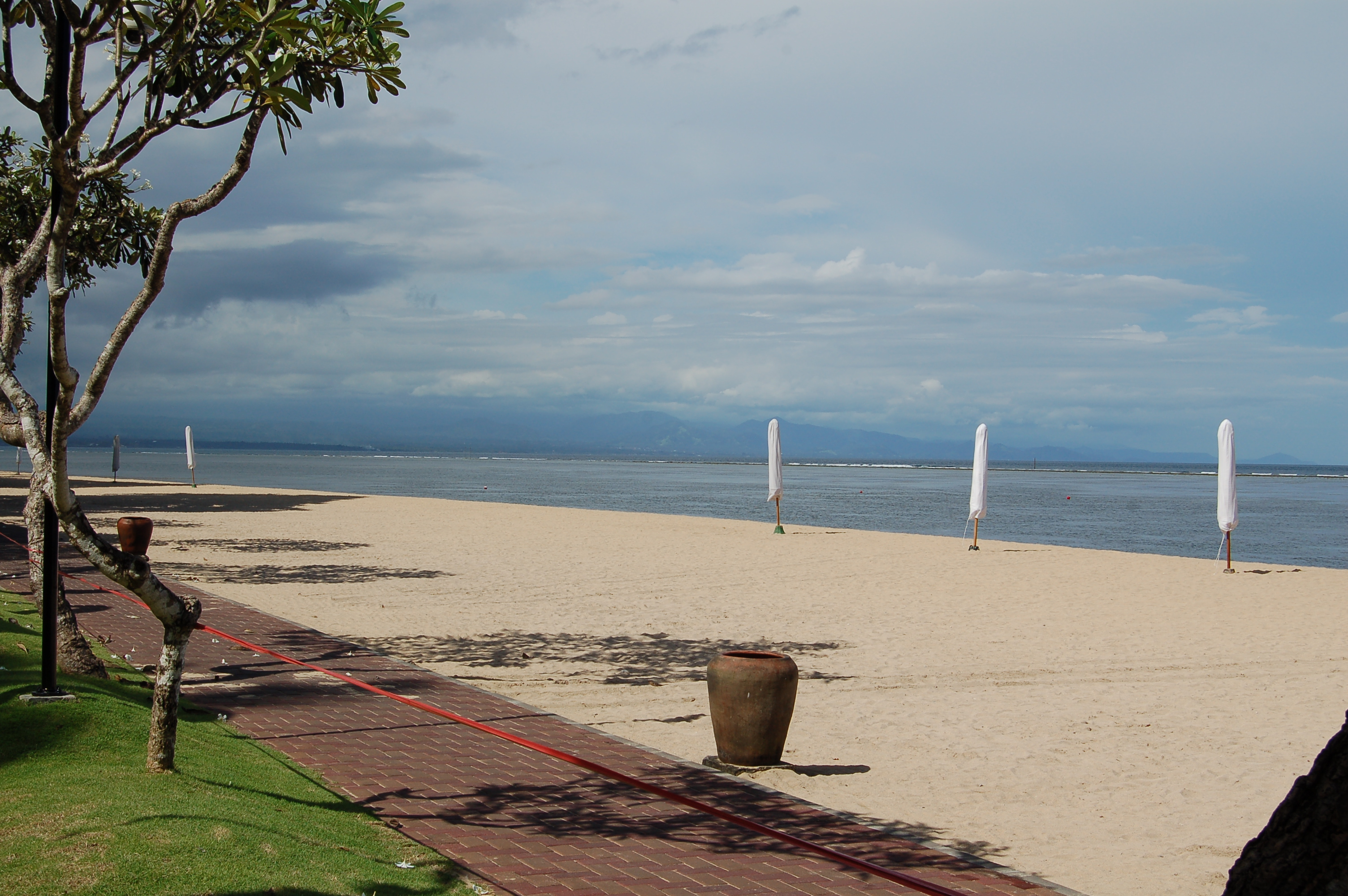
- A deserted Balinese beach during Nyepi
- Also called: Day of Silence
- Observed by: Balinese Hindus
- Type: Hindu; cultural
- Celebrations: Perform tapa brata penyepian
- Observances: Prayers; religious rituals; fasting
- Begins: 06:00
- Ends: 06:00 the next day
- Date: Balinese Saka; 1 Kedasa
- 2025 date: 29 March
- 2026 date: 19 March
- 2027 date: 9 March

Nyepi (Balinese: ᬜᬾᬧᬶ), also known as Day of Silence, is a Balinese holiday held every Isakawarsa ("new year") according to the Balinese calendar, and it can be traced as far back as 78 A.D.

The observance includes maintaining silence, fasting, and meditation for Balinese Hindus. The following day is celebrated as New Year's Day.

== Background ==
The word "Nyepi" originates from sepi, meaning "silent". The origin of the observance is a celebration of the Hindu Solar New Year based on the Shaka era, which began in 78 AD.

== Rituals ==
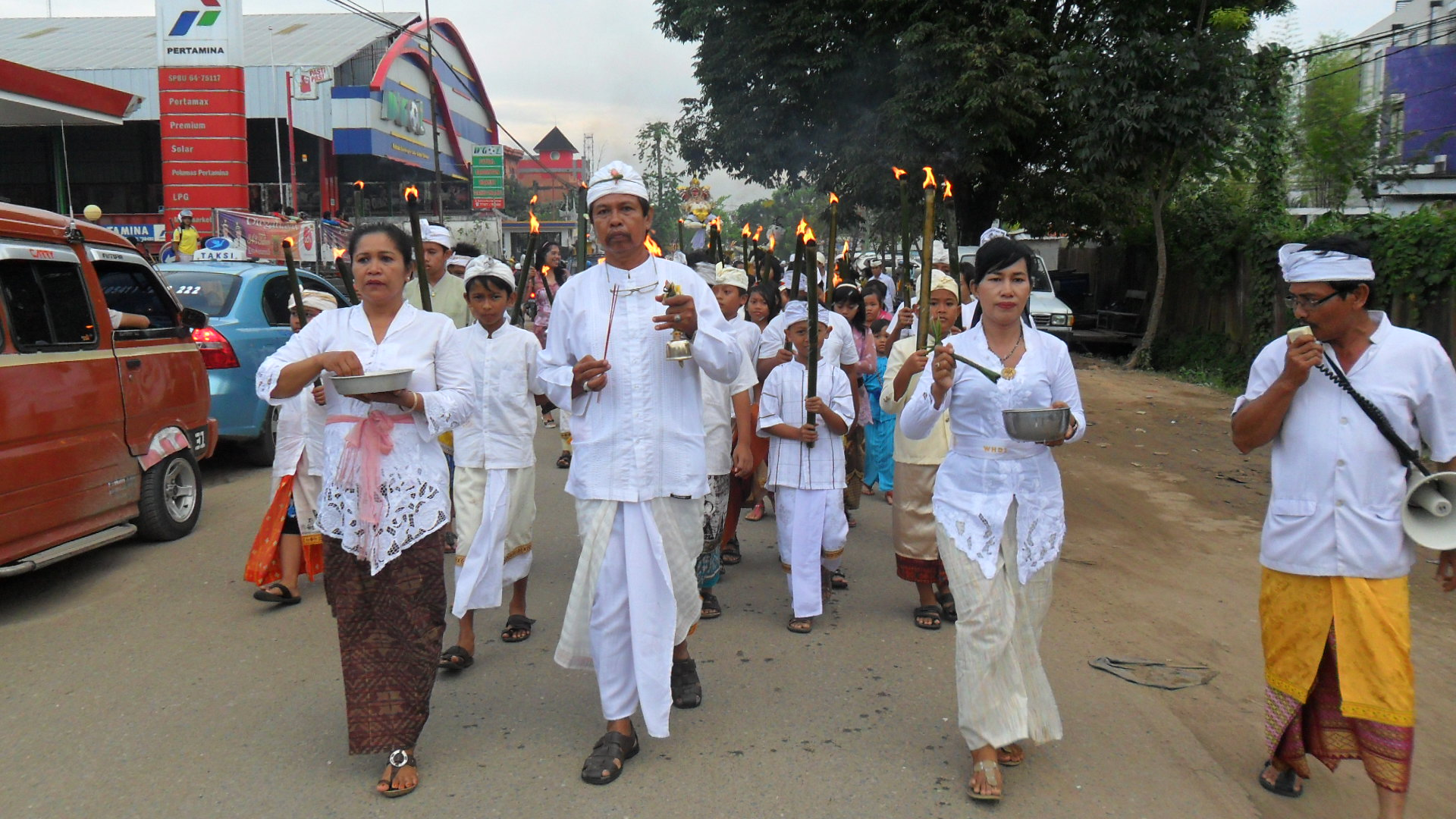
Tawur Kesanga, a ritual procession on the eve of Nyepi. Children carry lit torches that are used to light bonfires to burn ogoh-ogoh statues.

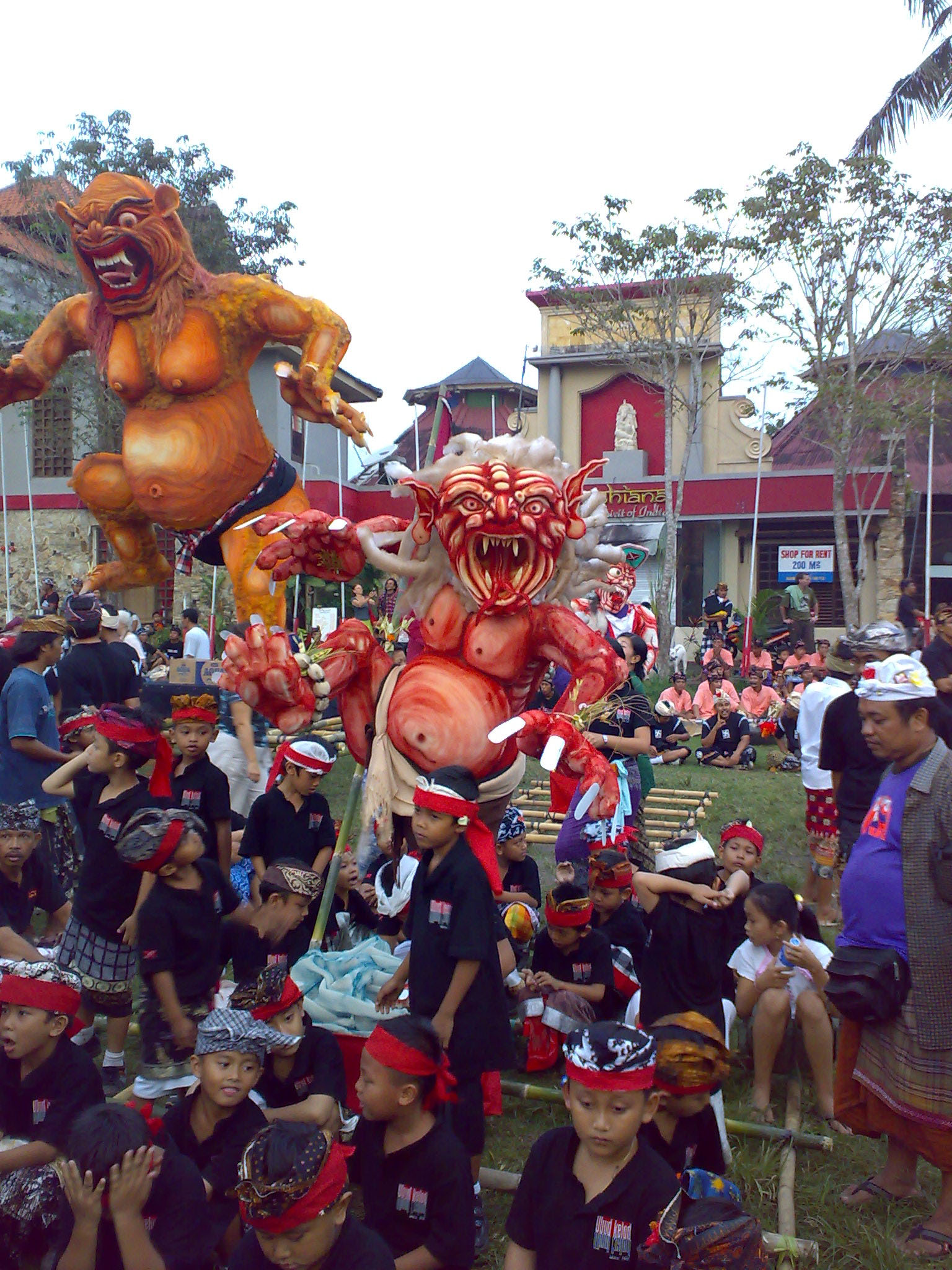
Ogoh-ogoh being paraded in the Ngrupuk area during the Bhuta Yajna ceremony

Observed from 6 a.m. until 6 a.m. the following day, Nyepi is dedicated to self-reflection, fasting, and meditation. During this period, activities that may interfere with this purpose are prohibited, including work, travel, and entertainment or leisure activities. The use of fire and artificial lighting is restricted, resulting in minimal electricity use, and residents and visitors are required to remain indoors across the island of Bali.

As Bali's usually bustling streets and roads become empty during Nyepi, there is little or no noise from TVs and radios, and few signs of activity are visible inside homes. The only people to be seen outdoors are the pecalang, traditional security men who patrol the streets to ensure the prohibitions are followed.

Although Nyepi is primarily a Hindu holiday, non-Hindu residents and tourists are not exempt from the restrictions. Although they are free to do as they wish inside hotels, no one is allowed onto beaches or streets, and the only airport in Bali remains closed for the entire day. Tourists who violate these rules can face deportation or even prosecution. A Swiss tourist was given a one-year prison sentence in 2026 for leaving his hotel and calling Nyepi "crazy" on social media. Judge Tjokorda Putra Budi Pastima said the tourist had "offended the Balinese people, hurt their faith[,] and provoked public outrage".

On the afternoon and evening before Nyepi, accessibility on roads is limited. Many local roads are closed for evening parades, making it difficult to navigate by car or motorcycle. Most local restaurants close early, and many ATMs are switched off, with cash removed until the day following Nyepi. Electricity remains operational.

The only exceptions granted are for emergency vehicles responding to life-threatening conditions and women going into labour.

On the day after Nyepi, known as Ngembak Geni ("relighting the fire"), social activity picks up again, as families and friends gather to ask forgiveness from one another and to perform religious rituals together. Fires and electricity are allowed once more, and cooking resumes.

- The Melasti ritual is performed 3–4 days beforehand, within Hindu temples near the sea and beaches. It is meant to purify the sacred objects pratima, arca, and pralingga and to acquire sacred water from the sea.
- The Bhuta Yajna ritual is performed in order to vanquish negative elements and create balance with God, humankind, and nature. It is also meant to appease Batara Kala, with offerings of live animal sacrifice. Around sunset, the pengrupukan, or ngrupuk ceremony begins inside houses, with noisy banging of pots and pans and bamboo tubes along with burning of dried coconut leaf torches to drive out demons.

Most Balinese villages make ogoh-ogoh, demonic statues made of richly painted bamboo, papier-mâché, cloth, and tinsel, symbolising negative elements, malevolent spirits, or even characters from Hindu mythology. After the ogoh-ogoh have been paraded around the village, they are burned in the cemeteries, although many are displayed in front of community halls for another month or more and sometimes even purchased by museums and collectors.

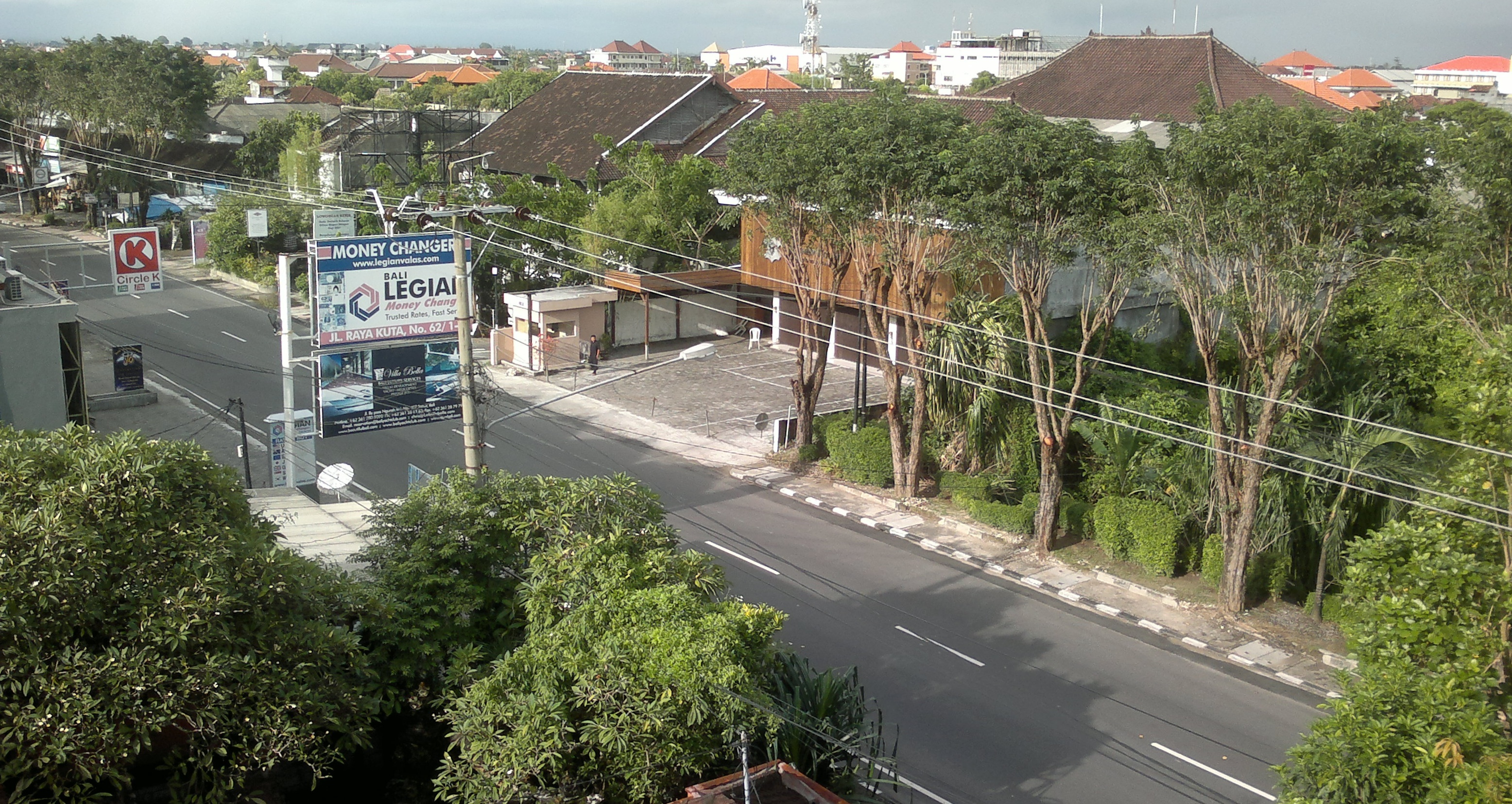
A deserted street during Nyepi

- The Nyepi rituals are performed as follows:
  - Amati Geni: No fire or light, including no electricity
  - Amati Karya: No working
  - Amati Lelunganan: No travel
  - Amati Lelanguan: No revelry/self-entertainment
- The Yoga/Brata ritual starts at 6:00 a.m. and continues until 6:00 a.m. the next day.
- The Ngembak Agni/Labuh Brata ritual is performed for all Hindus to forgive each other and to welcome the new days to come.
- The Dharma Shanti rituals are performed after all the Nyepi rituals are finished.

== Dates ==
CE year	Balinese year	Nyepi date
2024	1946	11 March
2025	1947	29 March
2026	1948	19 March
2027	1949	9 March
2028	1950	26 March
2029	1951	15 March
2030	1952	5 March

In 2024, the ogoh-ogoh parades were cancelled due to the general election being so close to the date of the festival and the regional government fearing that the parade may be used to convey political themes. Only villages, in particular traditional ones, were allowed to hold parades.

== Related festivals ==
Nyepi is related to festivals observed by Hindus in the Indian subcontinent, although the dates are not the same, due to the use of different calendars. For example, the Hindus of Maharashtra term their new year Gudi Padwa (in Marathi: गुढी पाडवा); Sindhis celebrate the beginning of their calendar year as Cheti Chand; Manipuris celebrate Sajibu Nongma Panba; and Hindus of Andhra Pradesh and Karnataka celebrate Ugadi.

== Security ==
Security is provided by hansip, while the pecalang are redirected into security roles from their usual tasks such as traffic coordination; both types of security forces report to local village heads.

== See also ==
- Indian New Year's days
