= Pecalang =

Community safety officer in Bali, Indonesia

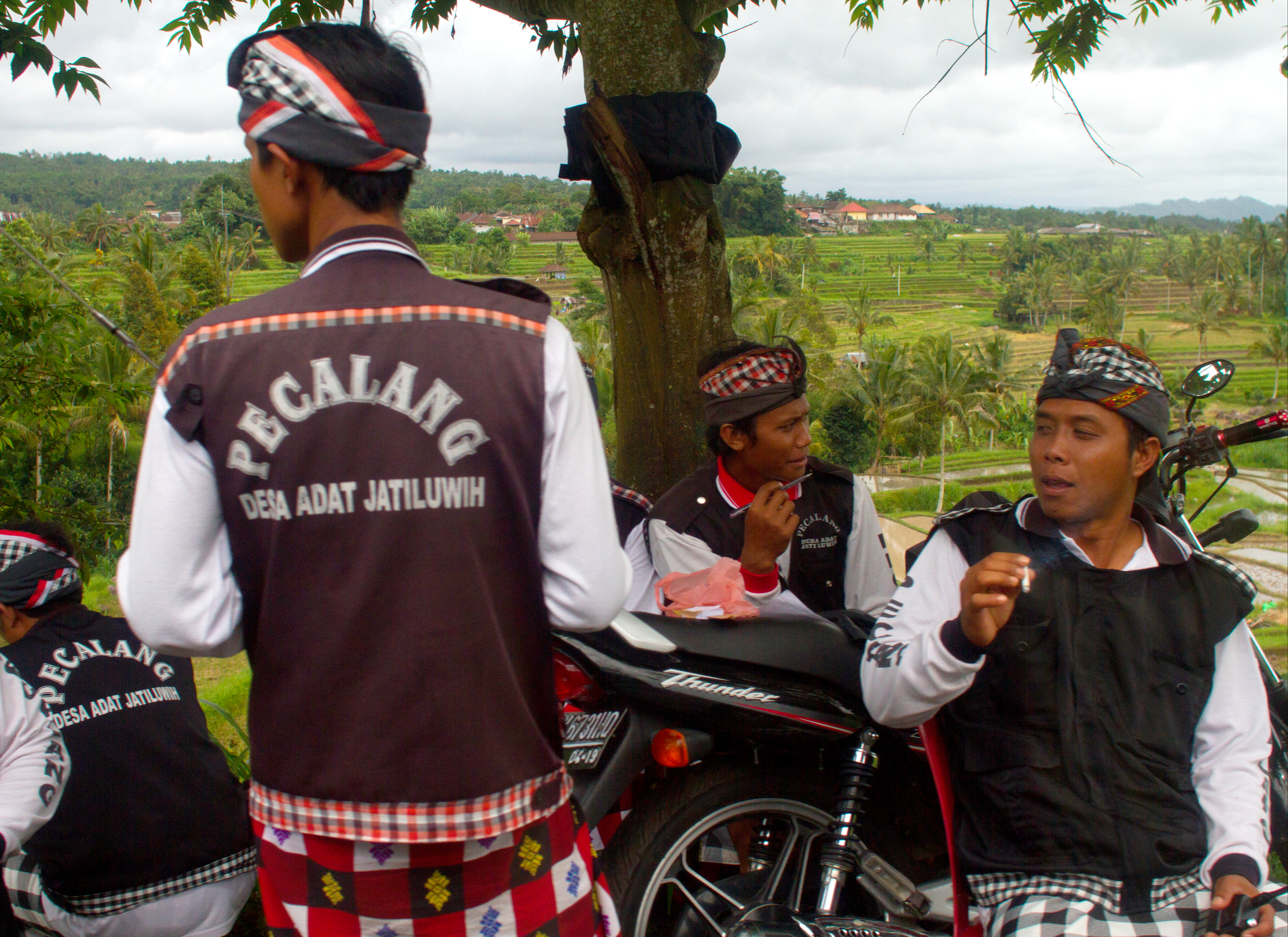
Pecalang at Jatiluwih, Bali

Pecalang (Indonesian pronunciation: [pəˈt͡ʃalaŋ]; pronounced "pechalang"; Balinese script: ᬧ᭄ᬘᬮᬗ᭄) are a type of local, traditional security officers of an administrative village in Bali, Indonesia. They are uniquely present in Bali and usually engage in mundane tasks such as assisting traffic control, but during large, usually religious events, they are tasked with general security. Pecalang work in coordination with other state security and law enforcement agencies, such as the Satpol PP and the police, but they only report to the village head, known as kepala desa. Bali has had hansip and pecalang security bodies for hundreds of years, and these forces traditionally reported to one of the royal families of the historic Bali Kingdoms.

It has been reported that some 22,000 pecalang were deployed for Nyepi celebrations in 2017.

== Uniform ==
Pecalang wear white and black-checkered Balinese sarongs and black vests over their shirts. They also wear the traditional Balinese headdress, known as udeng.
