= Ida Pedanda Gede Made Gunung =

Hindu high priest (1952–2016)

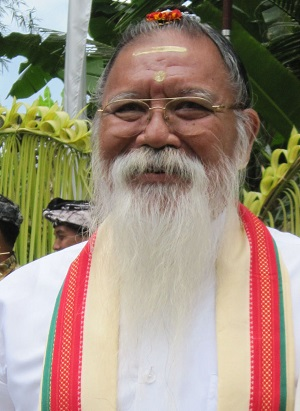
- 2016
- Born: Ida Bagus Gede Suamem; 31 December 1952; Blahbatuh, Bali, Indonesia
- Died: 18 May 2016 (aged 63); Denpasar, Bali, Indonesia
- Spouse: Ida Pedanda Istri Raka
- Website: http://www.idapedandagunung.com

Ida Pedanda Gede Made Gunung (31 December 1952 – 18 May 2016) was a Hindu high priest in Bali, Indonesia. According to sources, he taught and interpreted Hindu philosophy for a wider audience.

Ida Pedanda Gede Made Gunung was born in Gria Gede Purnawati Kemenuh, Blahbatuh, Gianyar, Bali, Indonesia. He gives dharma talks (holy sermon) to the Hindu community of Bali and other parts of Indonesia. He also had travelled on a holy journey to India with Dr. Somvir.

In preparation for priesthood, about 4 months before the ceremony, he went to hospitals and supermarkets to observe people and their conditions, and he practiced truck driving.
