= Hansip =

Type of security officer in Indonesia

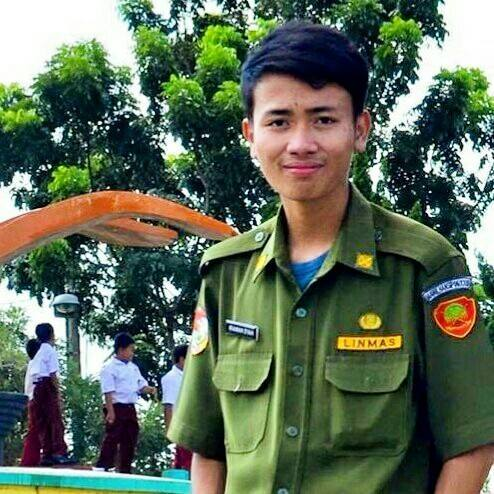
Hansip uniform

Linmas (Indonesian: Perlindungan Masyarakat, lit. 'Civil Defense') was a type of local security officers of an administrative village in Indonesia. Based on Presidential Decree No. 55/ 1972, Linmas was part of the defence and security component in Total Defence and Security System.

Hansip was disbanded in 2014 by the Presidential Regulation No. 88/2014. One of the reasons of this retraction is related to government regulation No. 6/2010. Its tasks and functions is currently conducted by the municipal police, locally known as Satuan Polisi Pamong Praja.

== In Bali ==
Hansip works in coordination with other groups - the police and pecalang (in the case of Bali), the latter being redirected from more mundane tasks like traffic direction to extra policing of large events.
