= Melasti =

Purification ceremony of Balinese Hindus

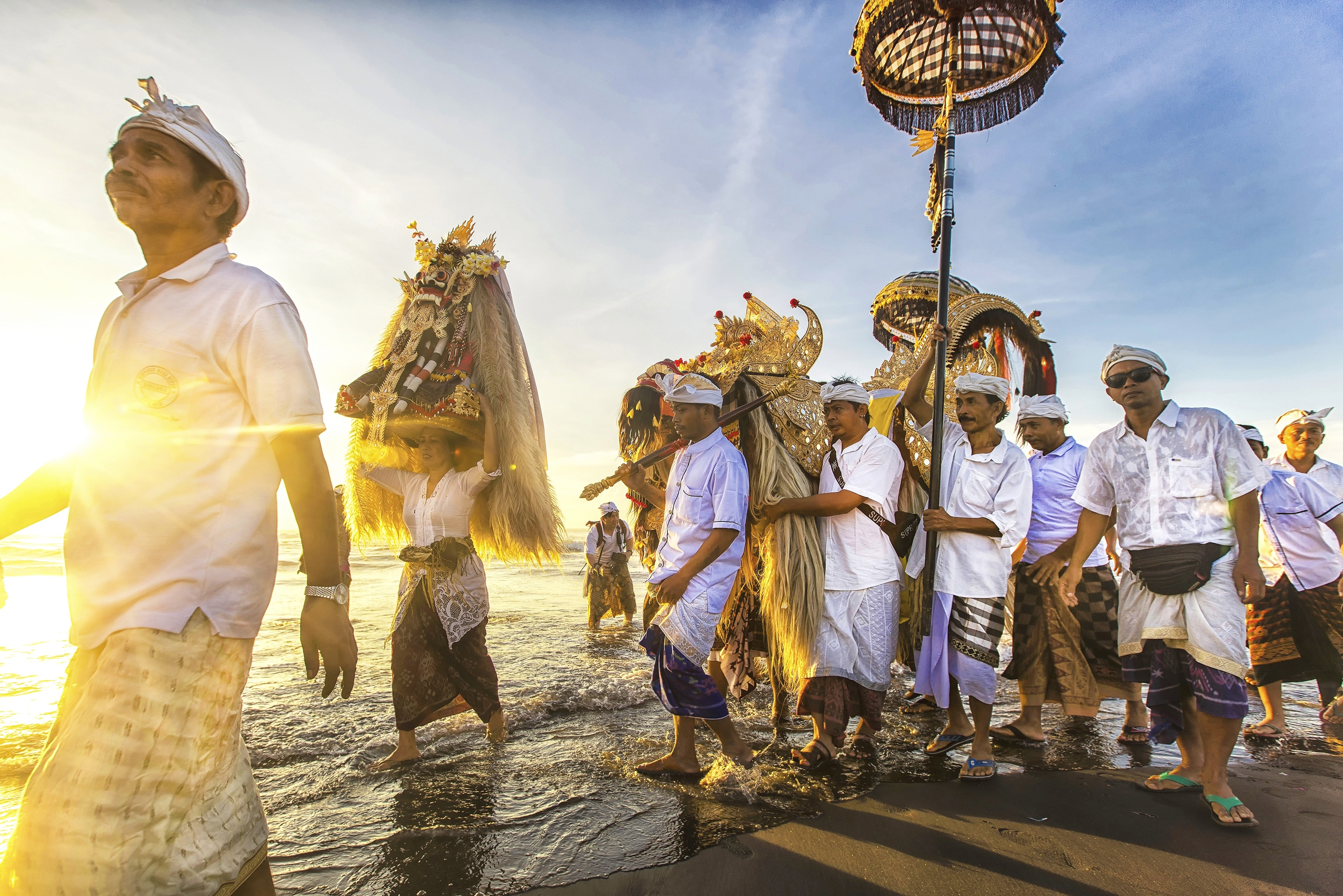
A Melasti ceremony in Bali in 2019

Melasti is a Hindu Balinese purification ceremony and ritual, which, according to the Balinese calendar, is held several days prior to the Nyepi holy day. It is observed by Hindus in Indonesia, especially in Bali. Melasti was meant as the ritual to cleanse the world from all the filth of sin and bad karma through the symbolic act of acquiring the Tirta Amerta, "the water of life".

The Melasti ceremony is held on the edge of the beach to purify oneself of all the bad things in the past and throw them into the ocean. In Hindu belief, water sources such as lakes and seawater, are considered the source of life (Tirta Amrita). In addition to performing prayers, during the Melasti ceremony, all sacred objects which belong to a temple, such as pralingga or pratima of Lord Ida Sanghyang Widi Wasa, and all of the sacred equipment, are cleaned and purified.
