= List of districts and sub-districts in Gianyar Regency =

List of districts and villages in Bali, Indonesia

The following is a list of districts and villages in Gianyar Regency. Gianyar Regency has 7 districts, sub-divided into 6 urban villages (kelurahan) and 64 rural villages (desa). In mid 2022, the population was officially estimated at 523,972 with an area of 368.00 km^{2} and an average density of 1,424 people per km^{2}.

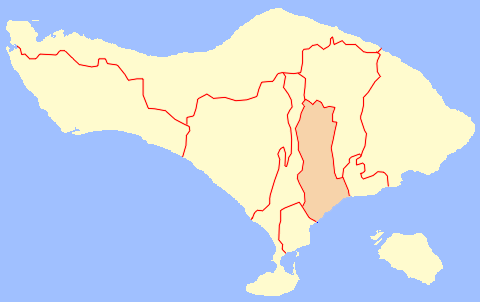
Map of Gianyar Regency in Bali

Map of districts in Gianyar Regency

List of districts and villages in Gianyar Regency as follows:

| Code | Districts | Urban villages | Rural Villages | Status | List |
|---|---|---|---|---|---|
| 51.04.02 | Blahbatuh | - | 9 | Desa | Bedulu; Belega; Blahbatuh; Bona; Buruan; Keramas; Medahan; Pering; Saba |
| 51.04.03 | Gianyar | 5 | 12 | Desa | Bakbakan; Lebih; Petak; Petak Kaja; Serongga; Siangan; Sidan; Sumita; Suwat; Tegal Tugu; Temesi; Tulikup |
| 51.04.03 | Gianyar | 5 | 12 | Kelurahan | Abianbase; Beng; Bitera; Gianyar; Samplangan |
| 51.04.07 | Payangan | - | 9 | Desa | Bresela; Buahan; Buahan Kaja; Bukian; Kelusa; Kerta; Melinggih; Melinggih Kelod; Puhu |
| 51.04.01 | Sukawati | - | 12 | Desa | Batuan; Batuan Kaler; Batubulan; Batubulan Kangin; Celuk; Guwang; Kemenuh; Ketewel; Singapadu; Singapadu Kaler; Singapadu Tengah; Sukawati |
| 51.04.04 | Tampaksiring | - | 8 | Desa | Manukaya; Pejeng; Pejeng Kaja; Pejeng Kangin; Pejeng Kawan; Pejeng Kelod; Sanding; Tampaksiring |
| 51.04.06 | Tegallalang | - | 7 | Desa | Kedisan; Keliki; Kendran; Pupuan; Sebatu; Taro; Tegallalang |
| 51.04.05 | Ubud | 1 | 7 | Desa | Kedewatan; Lodtunduh; Mas; Peliatan; Petulu; Sayan; Singakerta |
| 51.04.05 | Ubud | 1 | 7 | Kelurahan | Ubud |
| | TOTAL | 6 | 64 | | |

== See also ==
- List of districts of Indonesia
- List of districts of Bali
- Subdivisions of Indonesia
