= Tjampuhan Hotel =

Hotel in Ubud, Indonesia

Hotel Tjampuhan
- Interactive map of the Hotel Tjampuhan area

General information
- Location: Jl. Raya Tjampuhan, Sayan, Gianyar 80571, Ubud, Indonesia
- Coordinates: 8°30′14.040″S 115°15′12.240″E
- Opened: 1928
- Owner: Tjokorda Oka Artha Ardhana Sukawati

Other information
- Number of rooms: 67

Website
- https://www.tjampuhan-bali.com/

Hotel Tjampuhan & Spa, better known as the Tjampuhan Hotel is a historic hotel in Ubud, on the island of Bali, Indonesia. The Tjampuhan is the second-oldest hotel in Bali, trailing only the Inna Bali Heritage Hotel that opened in 1927. It is run and owned by the Tjampuhan Group under Tjokorda Oka Artha Ardhana Sukawati and his family.

== History ==
Hotel Tjampuhan was opened in 1928 and initially served as the royal guesthouse of the Ubud Palace, built under the instruction of King Tjokorda Gede Sukawati. The guesthouse became the home for German artist Walter Spies, who came as a guest of the king's youngest son, Prince Tjokorda Gde Agung Sukawati. Spies was widely credited to be instrumental in establishing both Bali's modern art scene and its profile as an international tourist destination in the mid-twentieth century. As the younger Tjokorda's guest, Spies later built his own house within the Tjampuhan compound, serving as a "studio cum residence cum hotel". His two-storied house now forms part of a larger set of hotel villas owned by the family of Tjokorda Gde Agung Sukawati.

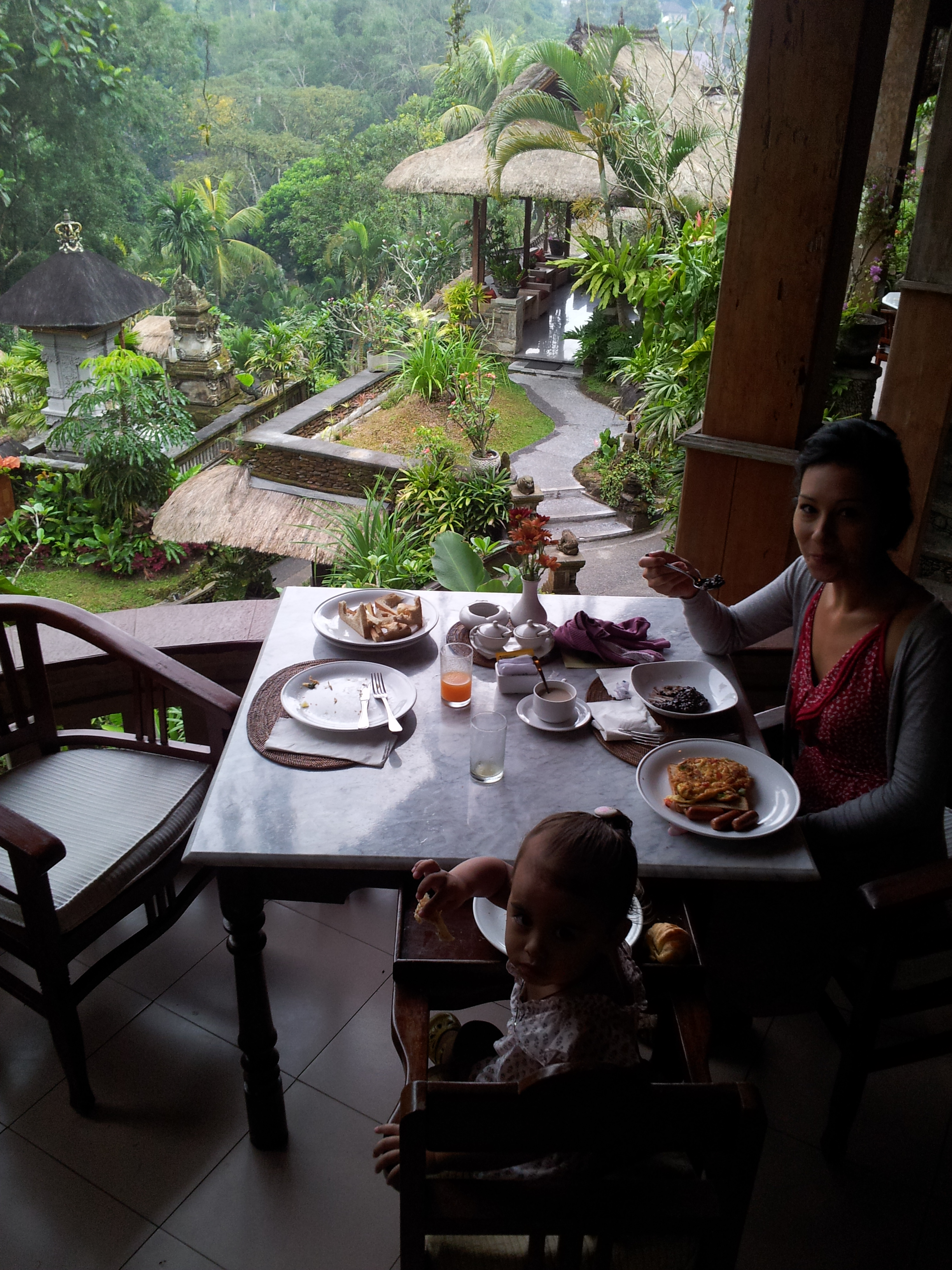
Breakfast at Hotel Tjampuhan

In 1934, the guesthouse came into prominence when it became the starting-point of the Pita Maha Association, founded by Prince Tjokorda, Spies, as well as Dutch artist Rudolf Bonnet. Pita Maha, which operated out of the hotel, provided new perspectives and inspiration on artistic styles and subject matter to many Balinese artists. The association promoted and marketed Balinese arts and artists, and later brought them international recognition.

Hotel Tjampuhan relinquished its status as a guesthouse and officially became a hotel when it opened to publicly paying guests in the 1970s.

The hotels name is derived from the word Campuhan, which means the "confluence of two rivers" in Balinese and also refers more generally to the area around this point in Ubud. Tjampuhan is the older Dutch spelling of the word. The hotel overlooks the River Oos. Robert Pringle writes that Campuhan "could serve as a metaphor for Spies' life work." The hotel's logo depicts a hibiscus flower, which was locally known as the late King Tjokorda's favourite flower.
