= InterContinental Hotel Bali =

Hotel in Badung, Bali, Indonesia

InterContinental Bali Resort
- Location in Bali

General information
- Location: Jalan Uluwatu 45, Jimbaran, Bali, Indonesia
- Coordinates: 8°46′43″S 115°10′3″E
- Operator: Intercontinental Hotels Group

Other information
- Number of rooms: 417

InterContinental Bali Resort is a five-star hotel and resort in Jimbaran in southern Bali, Indonesia. It is operated by the InterContinental Hotels Group.

The hotel overlooks Jimbaran Bay. The hotel has 418 rooms and fuses elements of traditional Balinese architecture with modern western architecture.

== Catering ==
The Jimbaran Gardens serves seafood, Indonesian & international cuisine, as well as casual dining at the poolside. The KO Japanese Restaurant specialises in Japanese cuisine.

The hotel also has the Saraswati Lobby Lounge, Sunset Beach Bar, Club Lounge and Bella Cucina Italian Restaurant. The hotel operates the Planet Trekkers Children's Resort, mini resort for children.

== See also ==
- Tjampuhan Hotel
