= Ubud District =

District in Gianyar Regency, Bali Province, Indonesia

Ubud
- District
- Map of Ubud District within Gianyar Regency
- Country: Indonesia
- Region: Lesser Sunda Islands
- Province: Bali
- Regency: Gianyar

Area
  - Total: 42.38 km^{2} (16.36 sq mi)

Population (2019)
  - Total: 74,320
  - Density: 1,754/km^{2} (4,542/sq mi)

Ubud District (Indonesian: Kecamatan Ubud) is a district (kecamatan) in Gianyar Regency, Bali, Indonesia. Its area is 42.38 km^{2} and the population was 69,323 people as of 2010 census; the latest official estimate (as at mid 2019) is 74,320. but at any given time there are large numbers of temporary residents and tourists.

Neighboring districts are: Tegallalang and Payangan districts to the north, Tampaksiring district to the north-east, Sukawati district to the south, all four within Gianyar Regency, and Abiansemal district of Badung Regency to the West.

Villages in Ubud include the villages (urban Kelurahan and rural Desa) of Ubud, Kedewatan, Mas, Peliatan, and Sayan.
