= Tegenungan Waterfall =

Waterfall in Indonesia

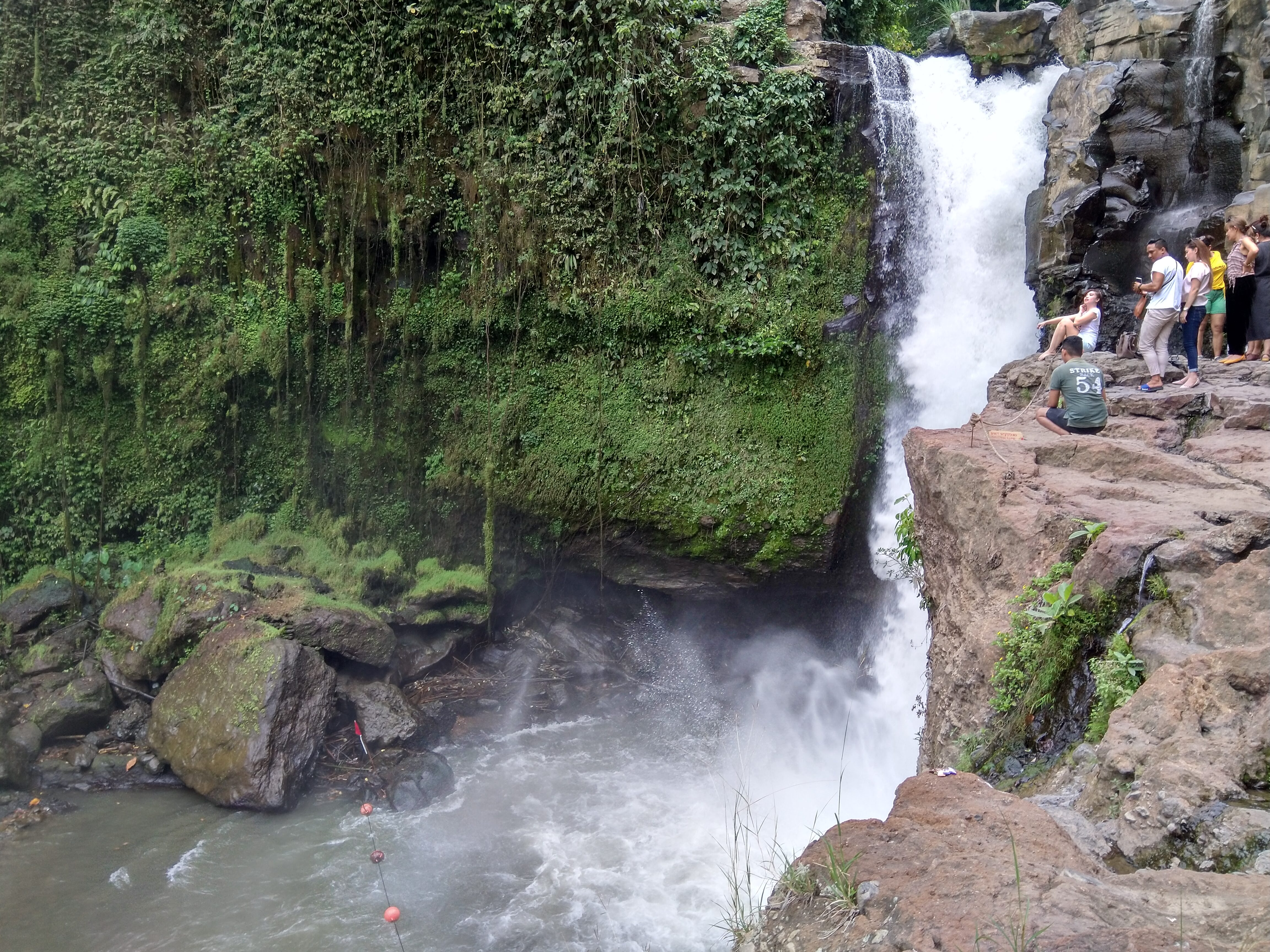
Tegenungan Waterfall from the side

Tegenungan Waterfall is a waterfall in Bali, Indonesia. It is located at the village of Tegenungan Kemenuh, also known as Kemenuh Village on the Petanu River in the Gianyar Regency, north from the capital Denpasar and close to the Balinese artist village of Ubud.

The Petanu River ranks among the longest rivers in Bali following the renowned Ayung and Telaga Waja Rivers. Stretching approximately 46.96 kilometers, this river flows past Tegenungan Waterfall originating from the highlands of Mount Batur in Kintamani. It meanders through regions like Tampaksiring, Ubud, and the village of Blahbatuh. The local community believes that the Petanu River provides both physical sustenance and spiritual protection making the area a sacred place for meditation and prayer.

Tegenungan Waterfall can be visited year-round with each season offering a distinct experience. The dry season which runs from April to October is considered the most favorable time for visitors. During this period the weather is generally clear, the water is cleaner, and trekking conditions are more manageable which making it ideal for photography and swimming. The rainy season from November to March brings heavier rainfall which resulting in a more powerful and dramatic flow of the waterfall. While the scenery can be particularly striking, paths may become slippery and less accessible during this time.

The waterfall is isolated but has become a popular tourist attraction. It is one of the few waterfalls in Bali that is not situated in highlands or mountainous territory. The amount and clarity of the water at the site depend on rainfall but it does contain green surroundings. The waterfall includes varying highs that can be climbed after the descent down stairs to reach it. This attraction also features a viewing point to the jungle and waterfall at the main entrance.

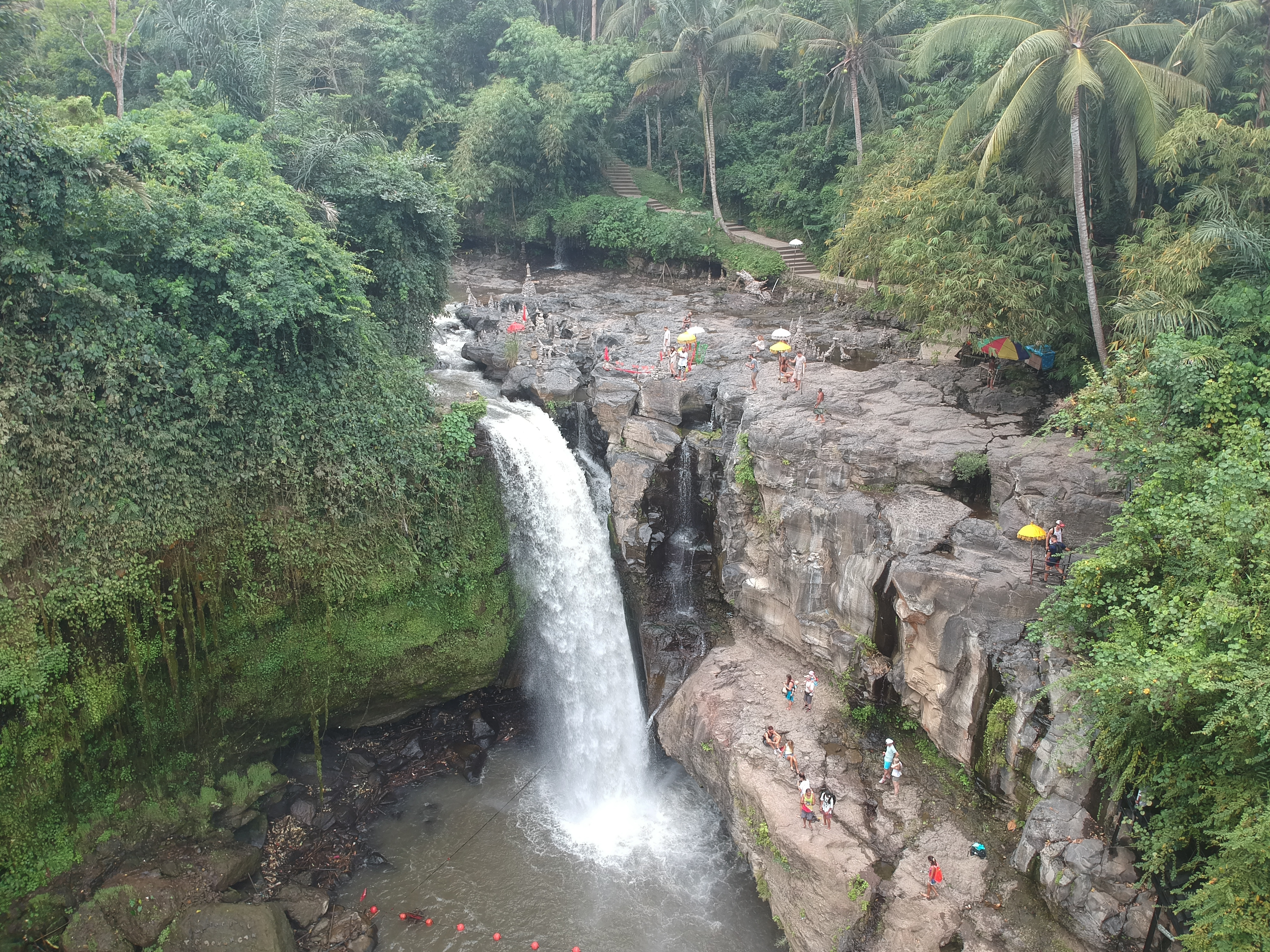
Front view of Tegenungan Waterfall at Tegenungan Kemenuh village in Bali

== See also ==
- Ayung River
- Bali Bird Park
- Kintamani
- Lake Batur
- Mount Batur
- Subak (irrigation)
