= Masceti Beach =

Beach in Bali, Indonesia

Masceti Beach is a beach located in Medahan, Keramas Village, Blahbatuh District, Gianyar Regency in the Indonesian province and island of Bali, Indonesia. It can be accessed from by pass Ida bagus Mantra, it takes about 30 minutes from Denpasar. Nearby is the Hindu Temple, Pura Mescati, considered a Hindu sacred site, and swimming and other activities are not allowed.
