= Blanco Renaissance Museum =

Museum in Bali, Indonesia

Coordinates: 8.5058°S 115.2543°E

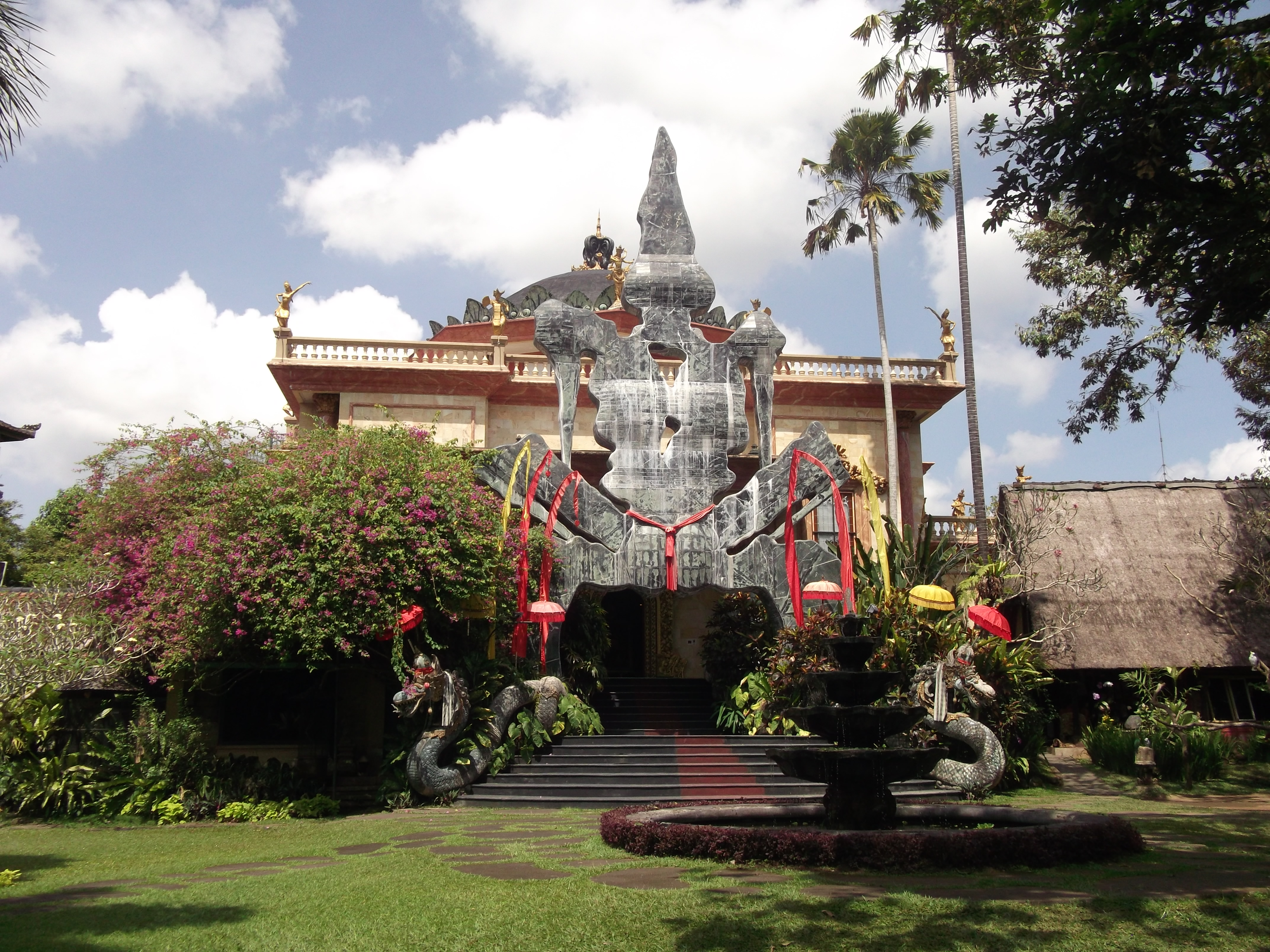
- Blanco Renaissance Museum
- Established: December 28, 1998
- Location: Ubud, Bali, Indonesia
- Website: blancomuseum.com

The Blanco Renaissance Museum is a museum located in Ubud on Bali, Indonesia that opened December 28, 1998. It's devoted to the art of the painter Antonio Blanco.

== Literature ==
- Lenzi, Iola (2004). Museums of Southeast Asia. Singapore: Archipelago Press. p. 35. ISBN 981-4068-96-9.
