= Ubud Palace =

Building complex in Bali, Indonesia

Coordinates: 8.5068°S 115.2626°E

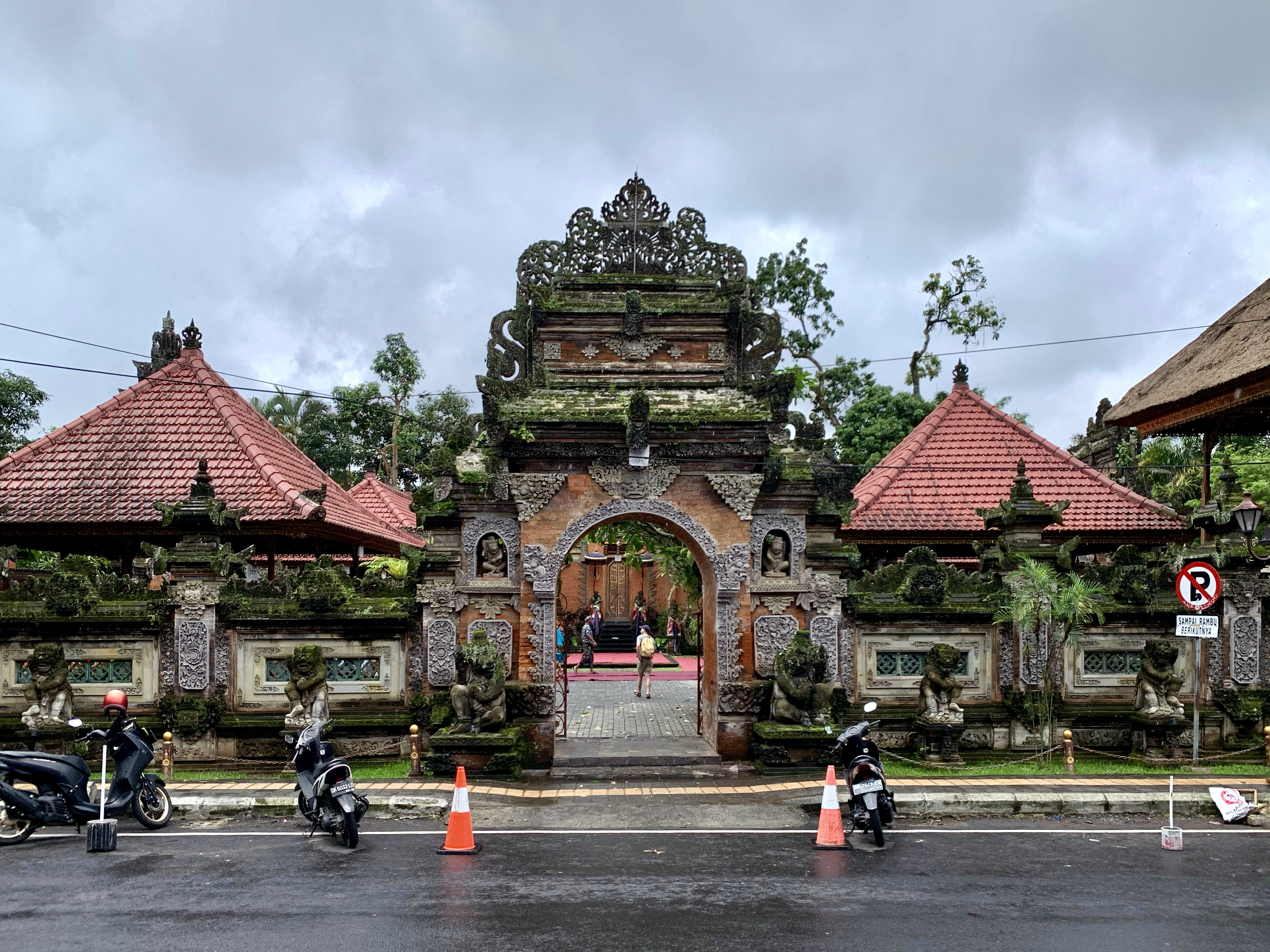
Gate of Ubud Palace

The Ubud Palace, officially Puri Saren Agung, is a historical building complex situated in Ubud, Gianyar Regency of Bali, Indonesia.

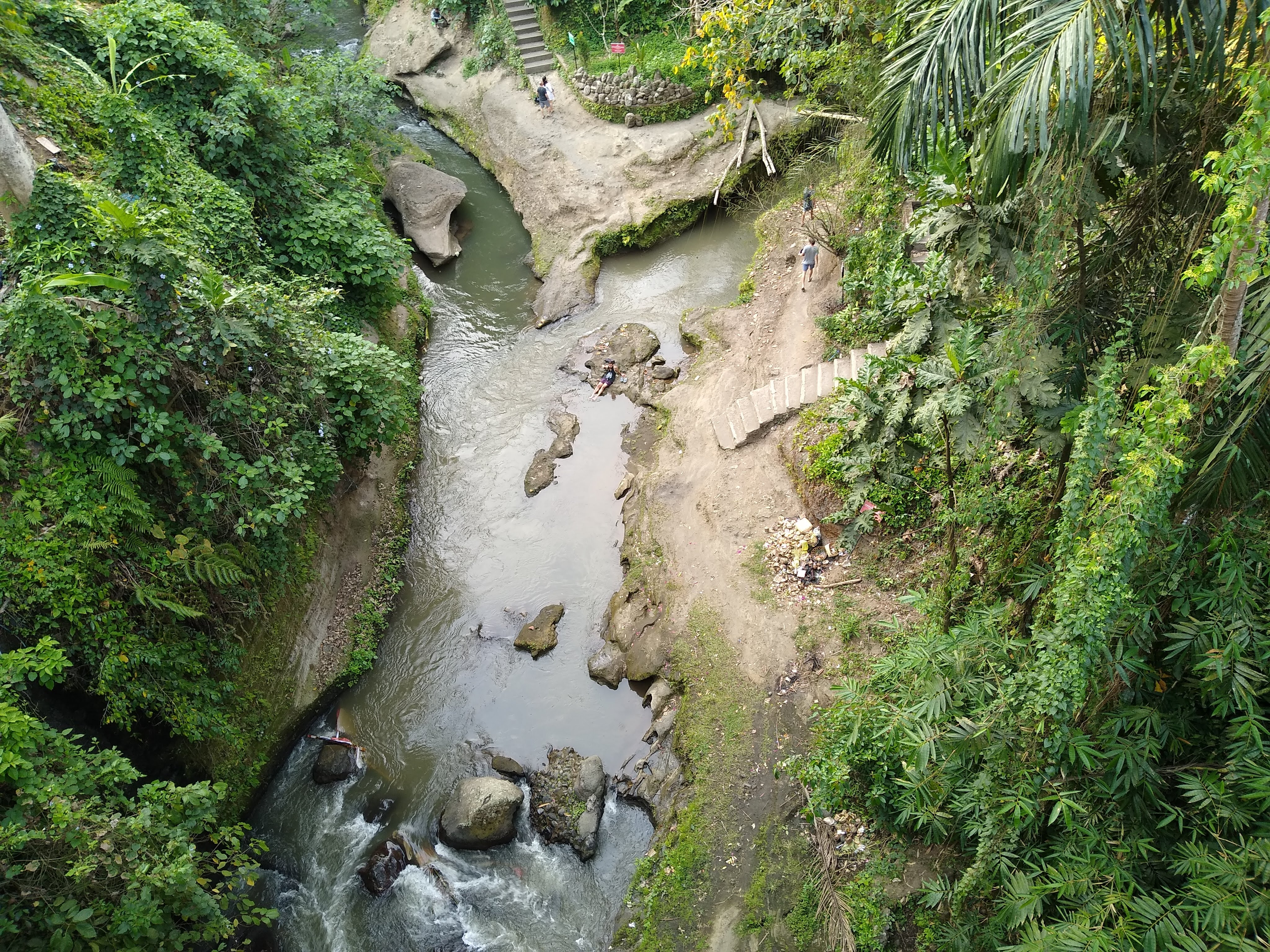
Campuhan river junction

== History ==
The palace was the official residence of the royal family of Ubud.

During his travels, Rsi Markandya received a divine revelation that he was to bury five precious metals on a mountain slope in Bali, where the Mother Temple of Besakih now stands. With a group of followers, Rsi Markandya was magnetically attracted to a destination located in the central foothills of the island that radiated light and energy. This place was Campuhan in Ubud, at a confluence in the Wos River and it was here that he felt compelled to build a temple, Pura Gunung Lebah.

On subsequent expeditions around Bali, Rsi Markandya built a number of other significant temples and created a shared irrigation system for the terraced landscape that is still practiced by farmers today. The formation of the banjar, which is a village council responsible for community and religious affairs, was also inspired by Rsi Markandya. In essence, it can be said that Rsi Markandya is responsible for the foundation of Balinese Hinduism in its purest form referred to as Agama Tirtha or the religion of holy water.

Since its settlement in the 8th century, the area of Campuhan has always been highly regarded by Balinese for its immense spiritual powers. Even the term Ubud is derived from the term ubad, meaning "medicine", in reference to the traditional healing properties of the various plants that grew in the area. Generations of Hindu worshippers have made special pilgrimages to the confluence in the Wos River to mediate, bathe and collect holy water for temple ceremonies and cleansing rituals.

There had always been ties between Java and Bali, but it was the disintegration of the once mighty Majapahit Empire in the 15th century that saw a mass exodus of nobles to Bali. A new kingdom on the island's east coast called Gelgel was consequently established and gave sanctuary to many important ruling families. They brought with them an artistic legacy and the principles of the caste system.

By the 17th century, Bali invariably experienced a rapid emergence of new kingdoms, including the founding of several royal houses in Ubud. However, this period also saw clans battle for supremacy. A prince from Klungkung was sent to create a palace in Sukawati as a centre of great power and aesthetic beauty, with artisans from all over Bali helping in its construction and eventually settling in the realm. Sukawati today strongly supports all forms of artistry including dance and music.

With the successful establishment of a reigning authority in Sukawati, palace retainers were sent in the late 1700s to secure the area of Ubud. A pair of cousins formed rival communities in Padang Tegal and further north in the area of Taman. Following subsequent fighting between these neighbouring villages, the King of Sukawati sent his brothers Tjokorde Ngurah Tabanan to Peliatan and Tjokorde Tangkeban to Sambahan to establish palaces as a means to control these troubled areas.

== Description ==
The palace in its present form, was built in traditional Balinese style during the reign of Tjokorda Putu Kandel (1800–1823).

After the 1917 earthquake, palace structures suffered significant damage, but since it was the residence of the royal family it was quickly restored, before being opened to foreign guests in 1928.

Many of the stone carvings were made by the prominent local artist I Gusti Nyoman Lempad (1862?–1978). The main pavilion usually hosts dance shows at night. To the north is Pura Marajan Agung, the private temple of the royal family. The enclosure in front of the palace has a magnificent fig tree from Bengal and is also a residence for the royal family.

== Shows ==
The royal palace of Ubud is, especially known for its traditional Balinese dance shows. The stage of performance has an ornamented angkul-angkul background (traditional doors and guardian statues). The performances are animated with Gamelan percussion orchestras.

== See also ==
- Klungkung Palace
