= Tegallalang =

District in Gianyar Regency, Bali Province, Indonesia

Coordinates: 8°26′S 115°17′E

Location within Gianyar Regency

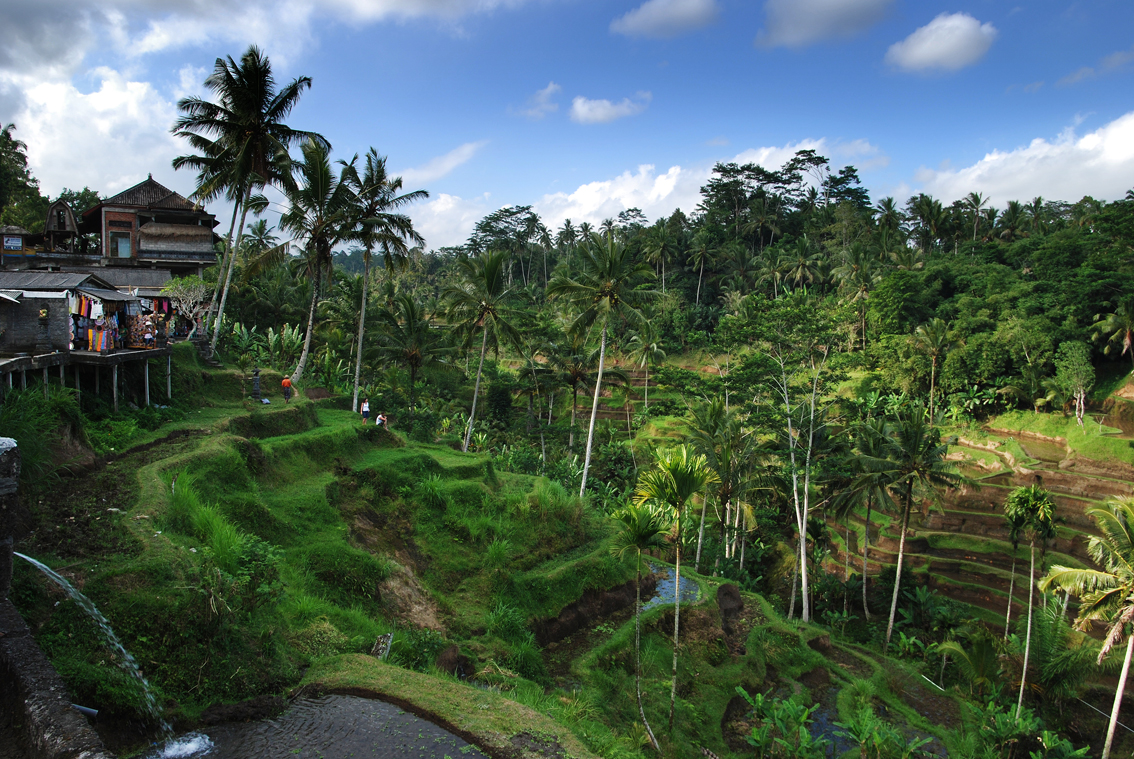
Rice terraces in Tagallalang

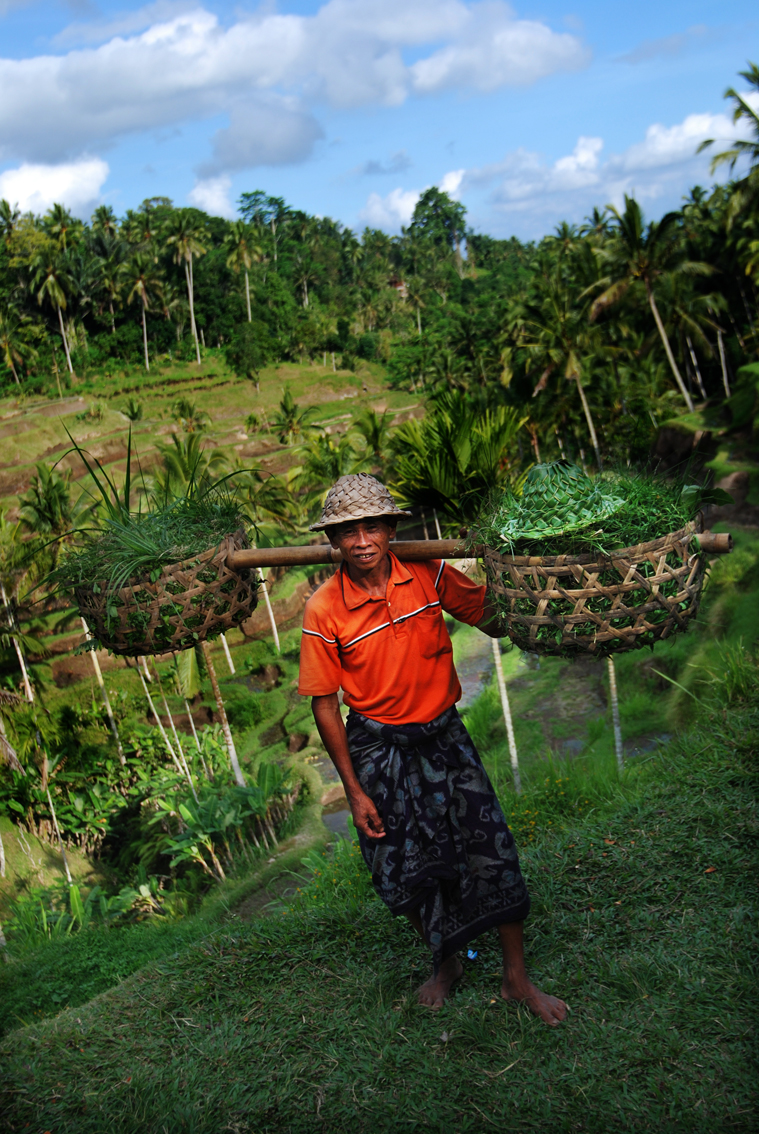
A farmer

Tegallalang is a district in the Gianyar Regency, Bali, Indonesia. As of the 2010 census, the area was 61.80 km^{2} and the population was 50,625; the latest official estimate (as at mid 2019) is 53,760. Located around 10 km north of Ubud, its terraced rice fields are a tourist attraction in the area.

== Gallery ==
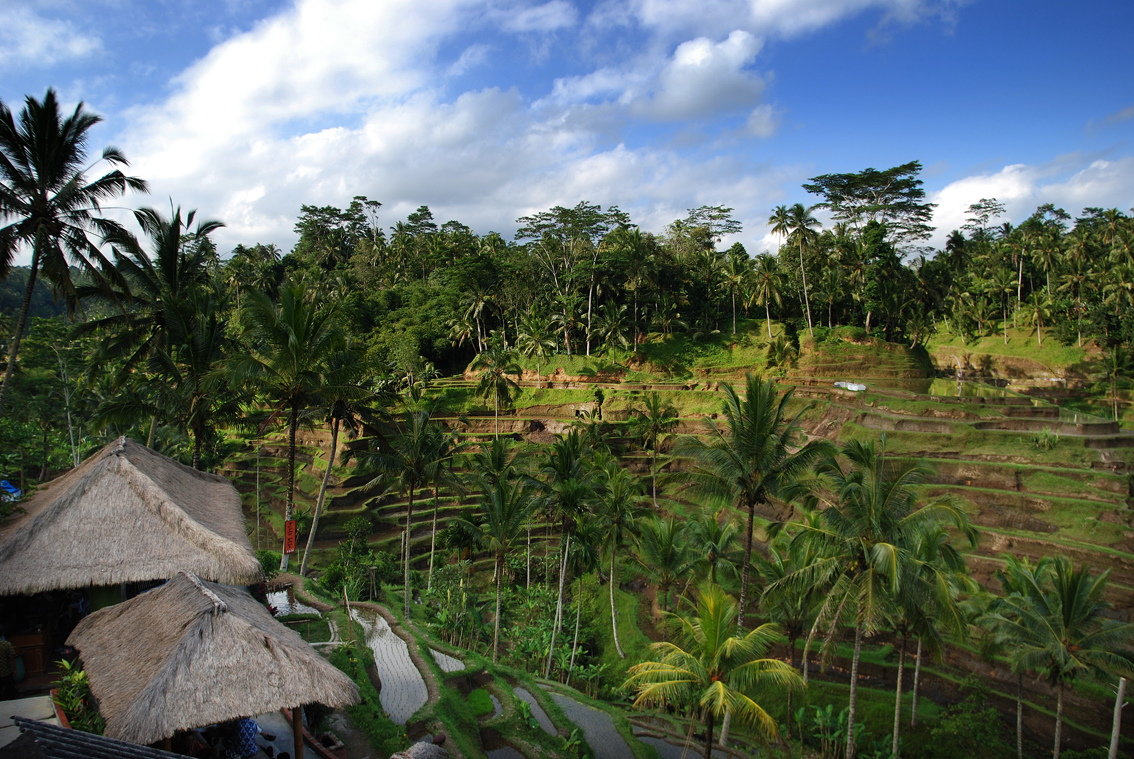
Terraced rice fields
