= Bakbakan, Gianyar =

Village on Bali, Indonesia

Coordinates: 8.5029°S 115.3279°E

Bakbakan is a village located in Gianyar Regency on the island of Bali, in the north part of the capital of Gianyar city.

== Ngenjung Sari ==
Ngenjung Sari is a part of Bakbakan as small sub-village located in Gianyar Regency on the island of Bali, in the north part of the capital of Gianyar city. It is part of the Bakbakan village area.
