= Blahbatuh =

District in Gianyar Regency, Bali Province, Indonesia

Blahbatuh ᬩ᭄ᬮᬳ᭄ᬩᬢᬸᬄ
- District
- Location within Gianyar Regency
- Interactive map of Blahbatuh
- Coordinates: 8°34′S 115°18′E
- Country: Indonesia
- Island: Bali
- Regency: Gianyar

Area
  - Total: 39.70 km^{2} (15.33 sq mi)

Population (2019)
  - Total: 72,140
  - Density: 1,817/km^{2} (4,706/sq mi)

Blahbatuh (Balinese script: ᬩ᭄ᬮᬳ᭄ᬩᬢᬸᬄ) is a district in Gianyar Regency, Bali, Indonesia. As of the 2010 census, the area was 39.70 km^{2} and the population was 65,875; the latest official estimate (as at mid 2019) is 72,140.

It was the site of archaeological finds in the 2010s.
