= Sayan, Bali =

Sayan
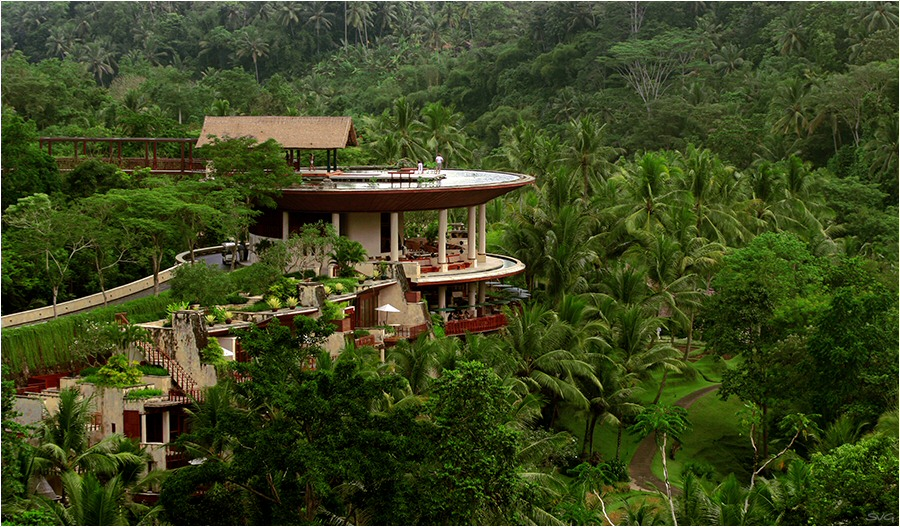
- Pool with restaurant underneath at the Four Seasons

- Location in Bali
- Coordinates: 8°30′1″S 115°14′30″E
- Country: Indonesia
- Province: Bali

Sayan is a village about 5 km (3 mi) west of the town of Ubud, in Bali, Indonesia. It sits on a ridge along the Ayung River.

A photograph of a typical sayan house compound of the past is found in Wijaya's architectural history of Bali
