= Payangan =

District in Gianyar Regency, Bali Province, Indonesia

Location within Gianyar Regency

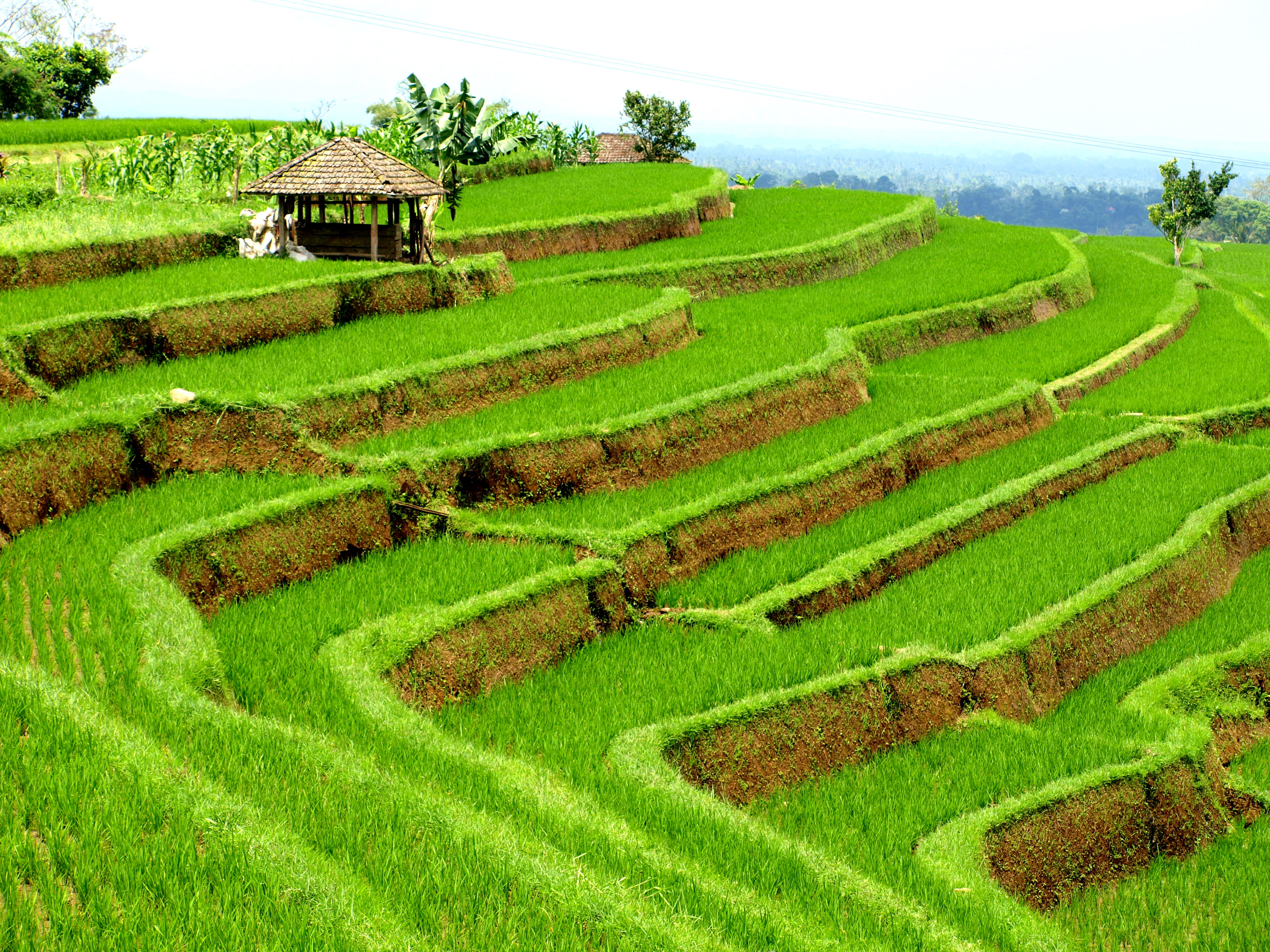
Rice fields in Payangan District

Payangan is a district in Gianyar Regency, Bali, Indonesia. It is located near Ubud.

As of the 2010 census, the area was 75.88 km^{2} and the population was 41,164. The latest official estimate (as at mid 2019) places the population at 43,190.
