= Bali Bird Park =

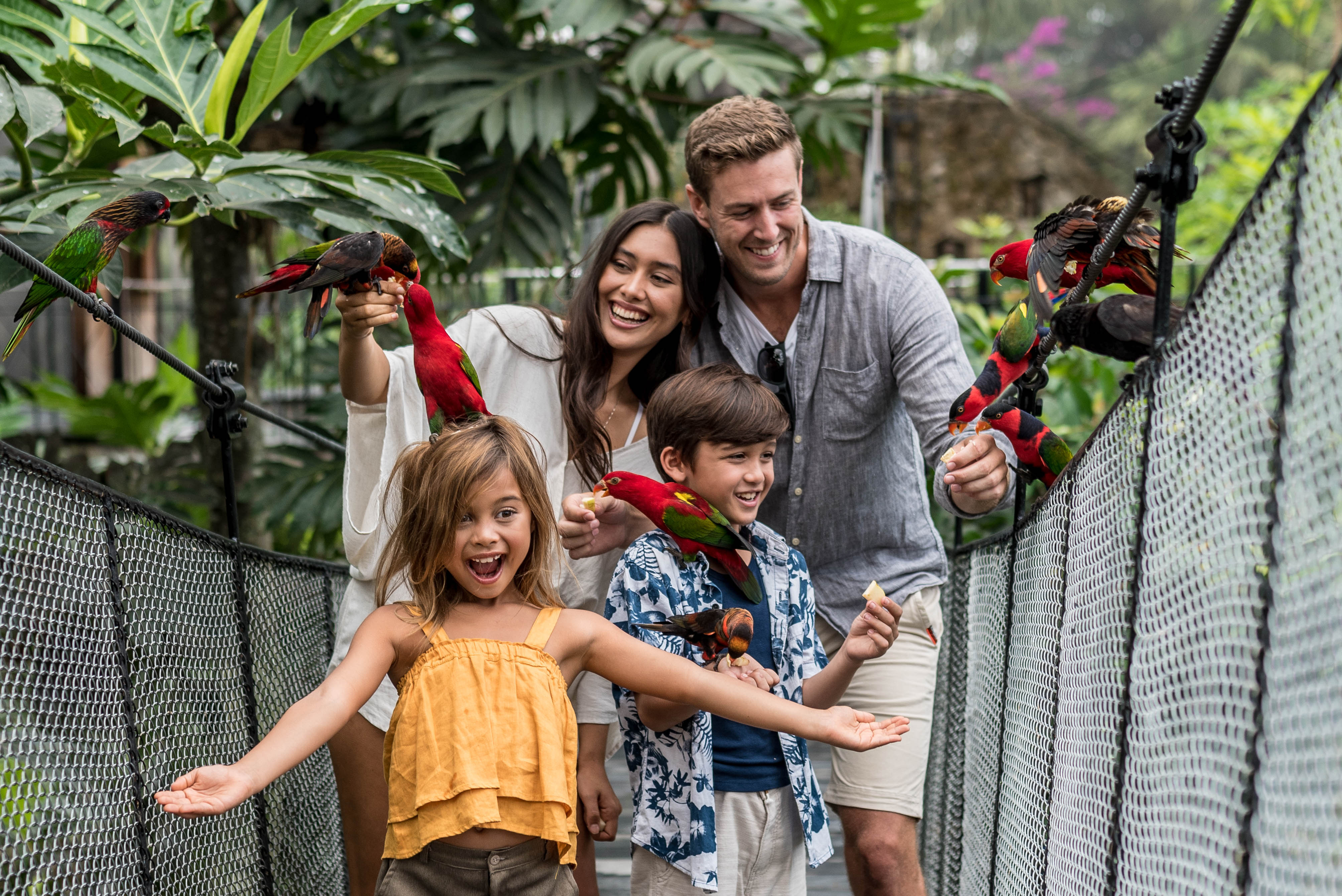
- Interactive map of Bali Bird Park
- 8°36′0″S 115°15′4″E
- Date opened: October 1995
- Location: Gianyar Regency, Bali, Indonesia
- Land area: 2 ha
- No. of animals: 1300
- No. of species: 250
- Website: www.balibirdpark.com

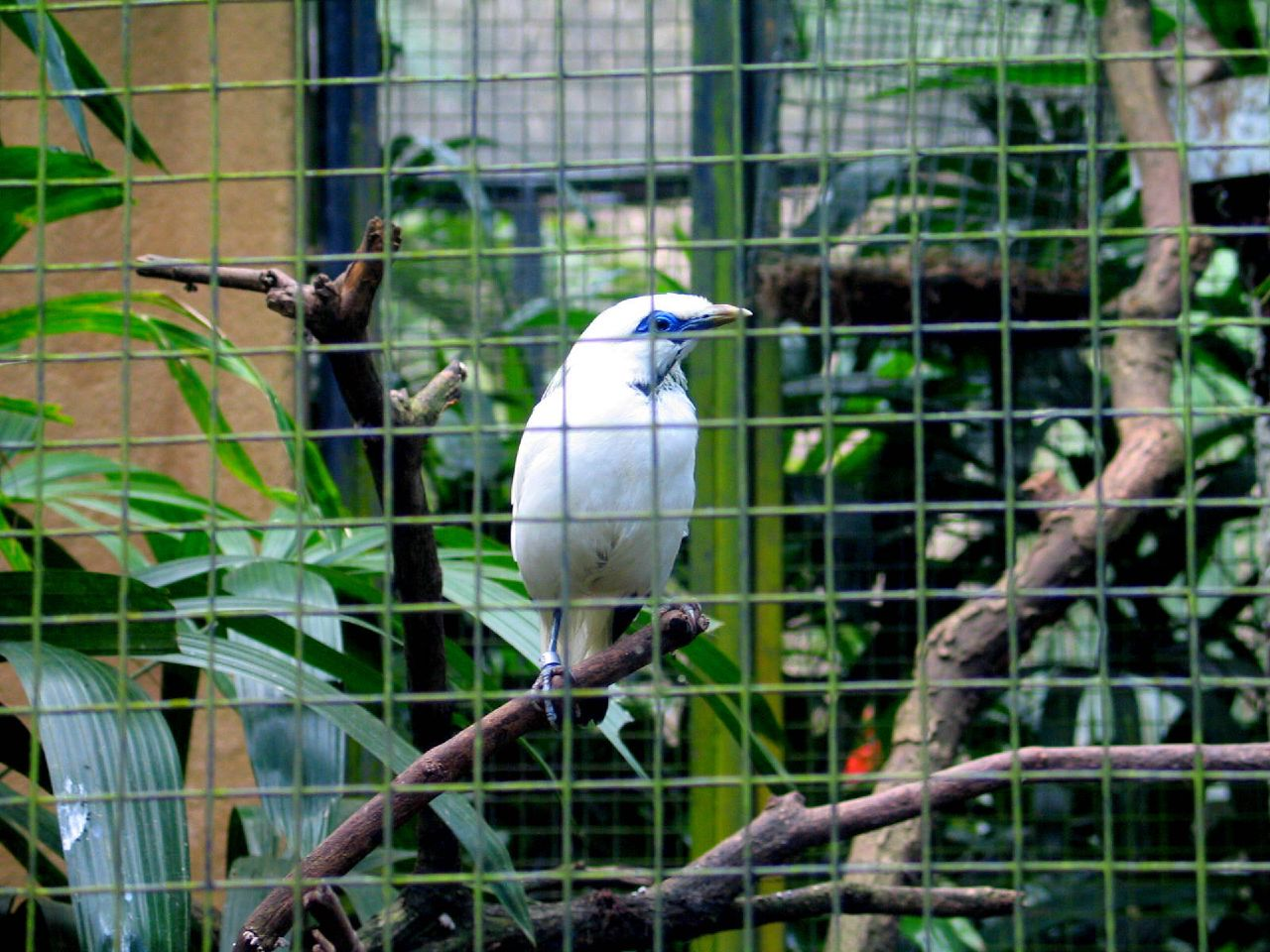
Bali myna in the cage

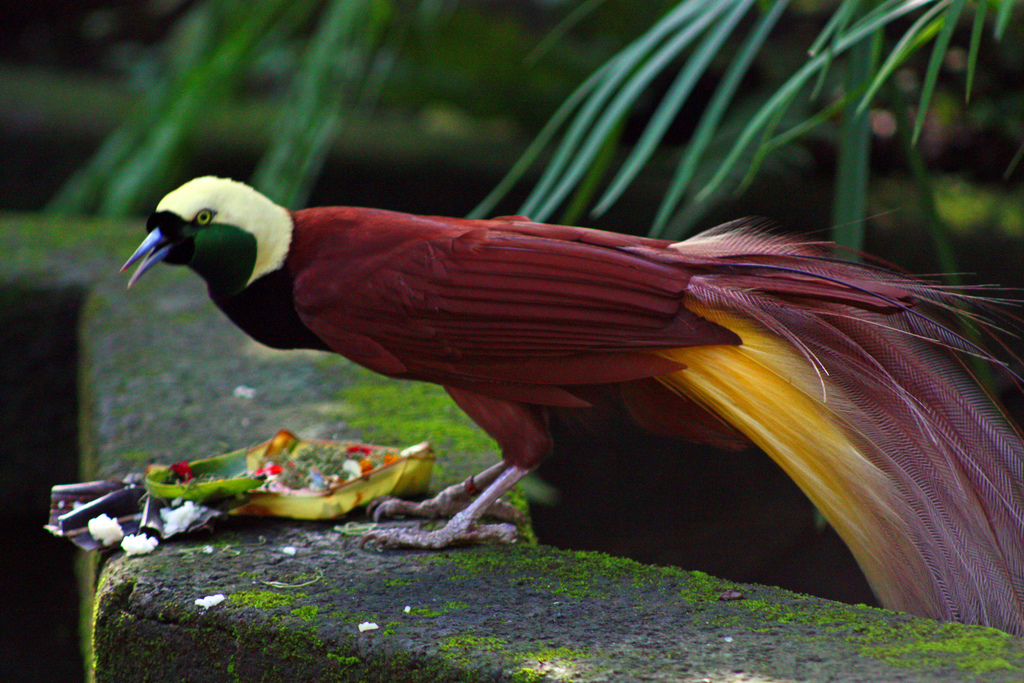
Paradisaea apoda in the bird park

Bali Bird Park (Indonesian: Taman Burung Bali) is a tourist attraction in Bali, Indonesia. It is located at the Gianyar Regency and has an area of 2 hectares (20,000 m^{2}). The park houses more than 1,300 birds representing more than 250 species in an enclosed aviary.

== Conservation Park ==
Bali Bird Park aims to be a “Centre of Excellence” for the breeding of Birds of Paradise and Bali Starling. There are a lot of birds breeding in the park all the year round.

The park has been landscaped to create natural habitats. Incorporating a diverse botanical collection, it features 52 different species of palms, rare jungle fruit trees, cycads, bamboos and cactus. Three lakes in the park host various waterfowl species. There are 60 bird enclosures with habitats to house the collection.

== Facilities ==
- Bali Starling Restaurant
- Children play area
- Rainforest Cafe
- Retailshop Sebun
- 3 Toilets in the park
- Car parking

== Location ==
Bali Bird Park is located inside the town of Batubulan, Gianyar on the road to Ubud. Approximately 45 minutes from Ngurah Rai Airport.
