= Ubud =

Town in Bali, Indonesia

- Town

Native transcription(s)
  - Balinese: ᬉᬩᬸᬤ᭄
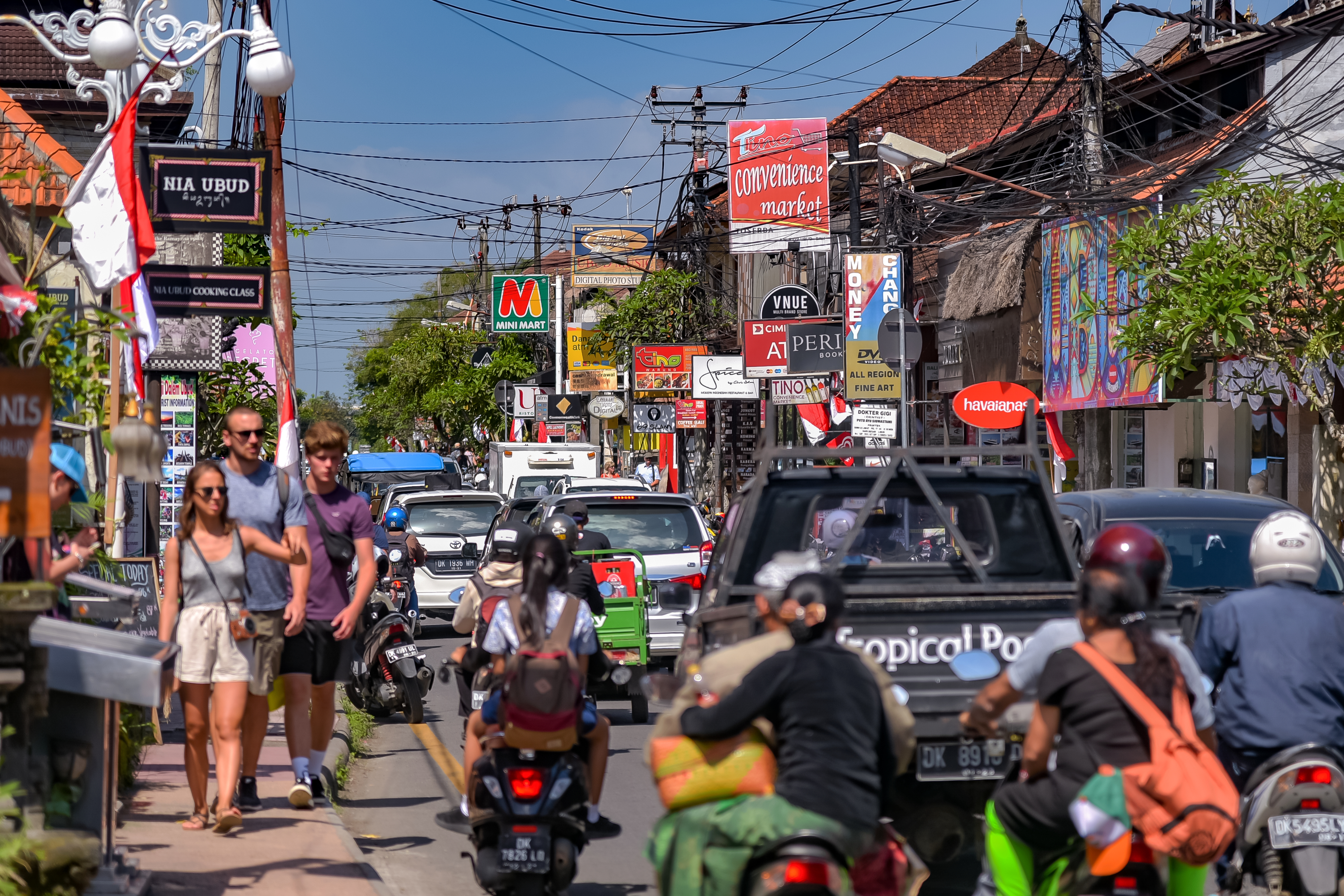
- Monkey Forest street
- Nickname: Ubud Capital of Culture of the World
- Interactive map of Ubud
- Country: Indonesia
- Province: Bali
- Regency: Gianyar Regency
- District: Ubud District
- Metropolitan area: Sarbagita

Area
  - Total: 42.38 km^{2} (16.36 sq mi)

Population (2020 Census)
  - Total: 74,800
  - Density: 1,760/km^{2} (4,570/sq mi)
- Time zone: UTC+08

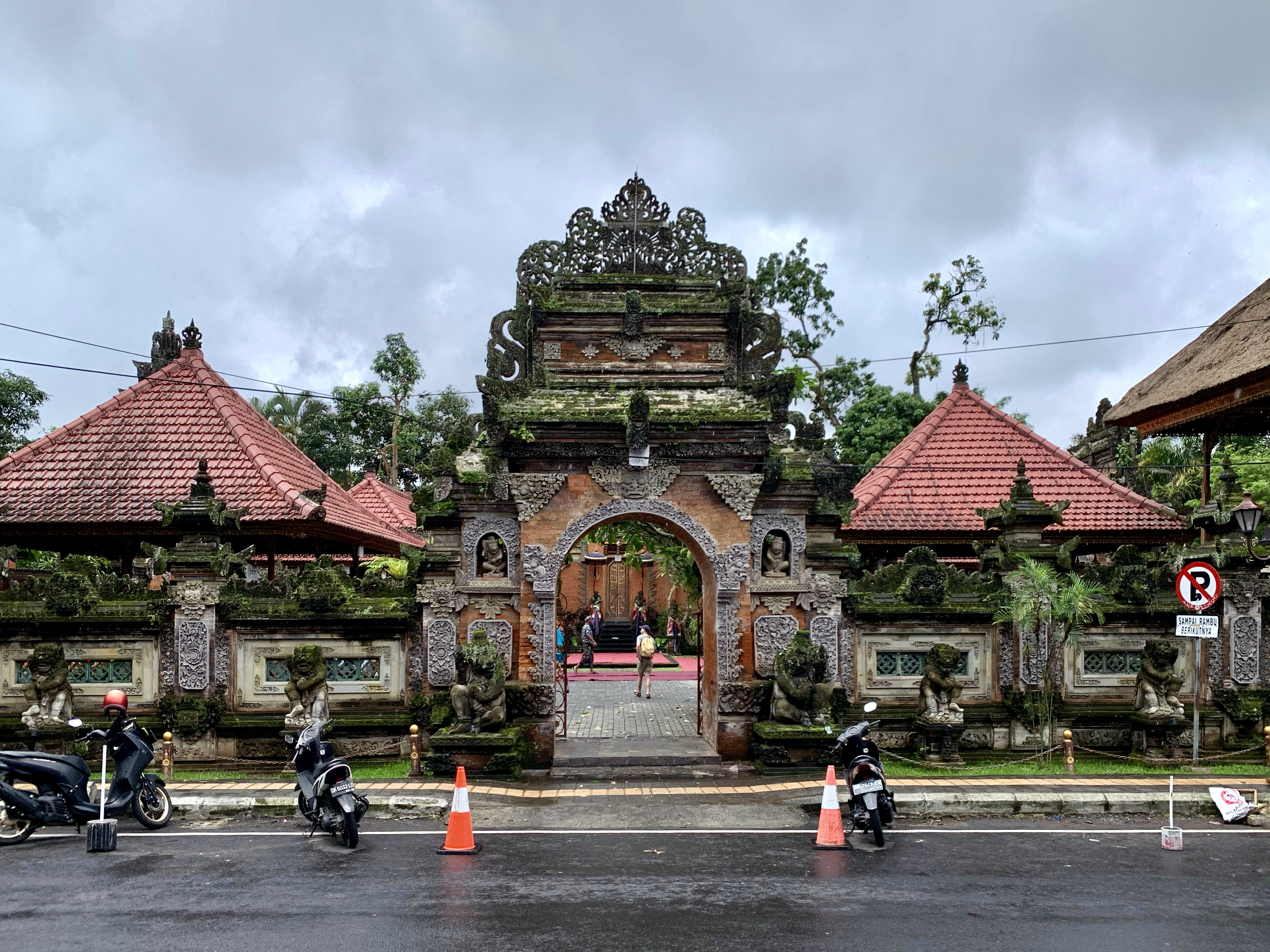
Ubud Palace

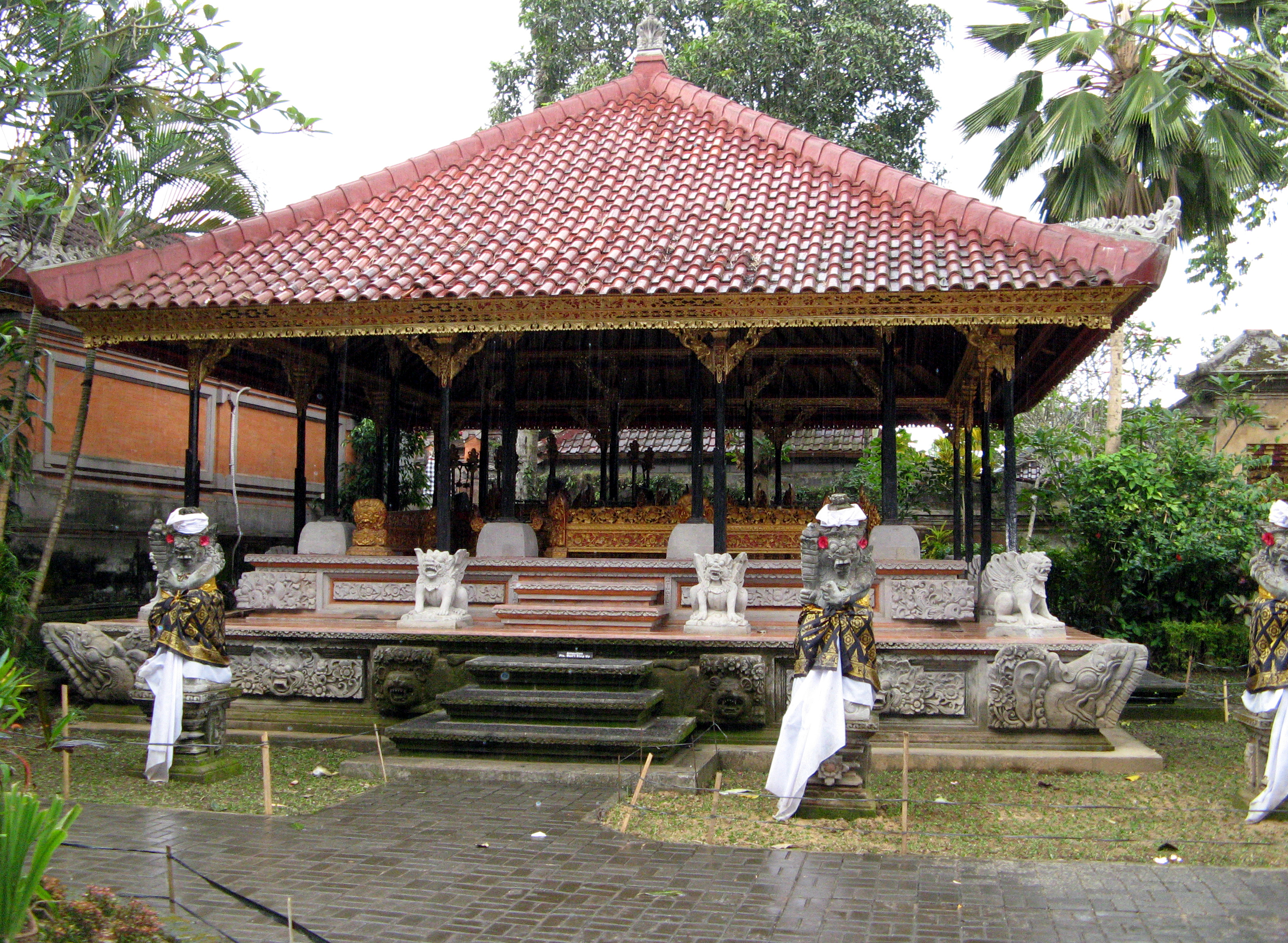
One of the halls of Ubud Palace

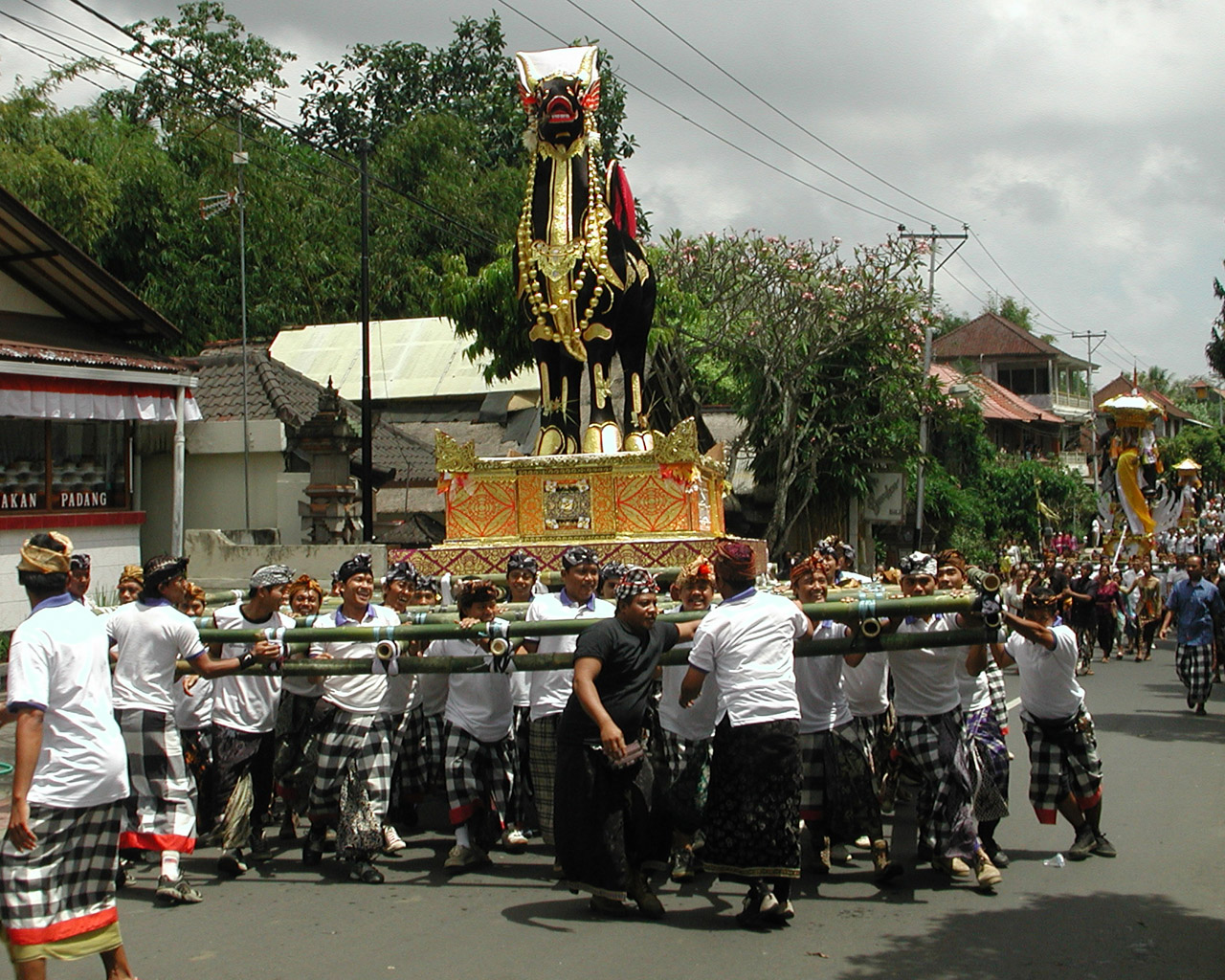
Royal funeral and cremation ceremony (2005)

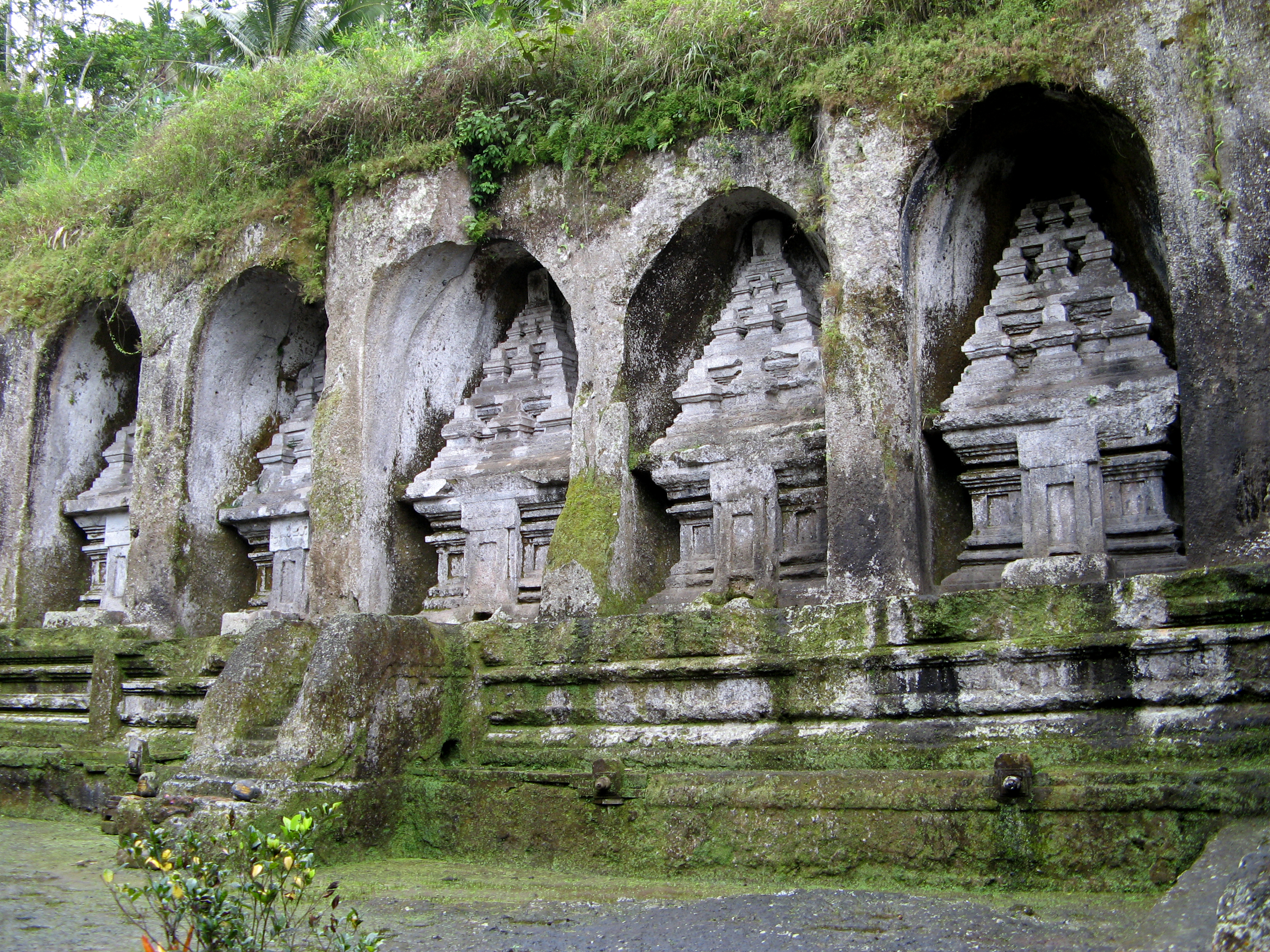
The kings' tombs at Gunung Kawi temple

Ubud (Balinese: ᬉᬩᬸᬤ᭄) is a town in the Gianyar Regency of Bali, Indonesia. Ubud has no status; that is part of the eponymous Ubud District of Gianyar. Promoted as an arts and culture centre, Ubud has developed a large tourism industry. It forms a northern part of the Greater Denpasar metropolitan area (known as Sarbagita).

Ubud is an administrative district (kecamatan) with a population of 74,800 (as of the 2020 Census) in an area of 42.38 km^{2}. The central area of Ubud desa (village) has a population of 11,971 and an area of 6.76 km^{2}, and receives more than three million foreign tourists each year. The area surrounding the town is made up of farms, rice paddies, agroforestry plantations, and tourist accommodations. As of 2018, more tourists visited Ubud than Denpasar to the south.

== History ==
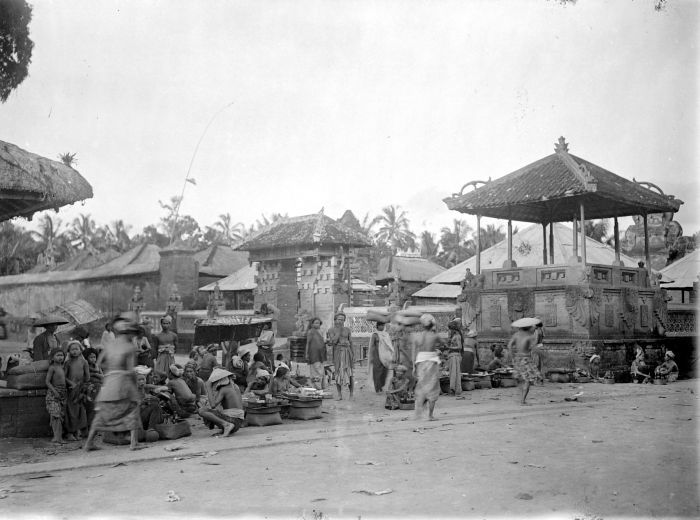
Market scene in Ubud, around 1912

Eighth-century legend tells of a Javanese priest, Rsi Markandya, who meditated at the confluence of two rivers (an auspicious site for Hindus) at the Ubud locality of Campuhan. Here, he founded the Gunung Lebah Temple on the valley floor, which remains a pilgrimage destination.

The town was originally important as a source of medicinal herbs and plants; Ubud gets its name from the Balinese word ubad (medicine).

In the late 19th century, Ubud became the seat of feudal lords who owed their allegiance to the king of Gianyar, at one time the most powerful of Bali's southern states. The lords were members of the Balinese Kshatriya caste of Suk and were significant supporters of the village's increasingly renowned arts scene.

Antonio Blanco, a Spanish-American artist, lived in Ubud from 1952 until he died in 1999. A new burst of creative energy came in the 1960s after the arrival of Dutch painter Arie Smit and the development of the Young Artists Movement. The Bali tourist boom since the late 1960s has led to significant development in the town.

In 2002, terrorist bombings caused a decline in tourism throughout Bali, including Ubud. In response to this, the Ubud Writers and Readers Festival was created to help revive tourism, the island's main economic lifeline.

== Streets ==
The main street is Jalan Raya Ubud (Jalan Raya means main road), which runs east–west through the center of town. Two long roads, Jalan Monkey Forest and Jalan Hanoman, extend south from Jalan Raya Ubud.

== Buildings ==
Puri Saren Agung is a large palace located at the intersection of Monkey Forest and Raya Ubud roads. The residence of Tjokorda Gede Agung Sukawati (1910–1978), the last ruling monarch of Ubud, is still owned by the royal family. Dance performances and ceremonies are held in its courtyard. The palace was also one of Ubud's first hotels, opening its doors back in the 1930s.

Some Hindu temples exist, such as Pura Desa Ubud, which is the main temple, Pura Taman Saraswati, and Pura Dalem Agung Padangtegal, the temple of death. The Gunung Kawi temple is the site of the royal tombs. Goa Gajah, also known as the Elephant Cave, is located in a steep valley just outside Ubud near the town of Bedulu.

The Moon of Pejeng, in nearby Pejeng, is the largest single-cast bronze kettle drum in the world, dating from circa 300BC. It is a popular destination for tourists interested in local culture.

== Transportation ==
Like other towns popular with tourists in Bali, it is not permitted to order a metered taxi or ride-sharing service for pickup within Ubud. Instead, a taxi and price must be negotiated with a member of the local taxi cooperative. This protectionist system ensures the driver is local and also keeps fares inflated to up to 10 times those available elsewhere.

== Economy ==
The economy of Ubud is highly reliant on tourism, with a focus on shopping, resorts, museums, yoga, and zoos. There is a strong focus on sustainable economy regarding the retail industry in Ubud, with many Bali-grown brands favoring materials and ingredients that would not cause much waste to the environment. From home and living amenities to tropical clothing brands, Ubud offers a unique array of retail options that have proven attractive to tourists from around the world.

One of the initiatives that have boosted Ubud as another popular tourist destination in recent years is the Ubud Food Festival (UFF). Happening in less than a week every April, this festival brings fellow restaurateurs and restaurants in Ubud together to create either special menus or particular promotions that may not be available in other months.

In contrast to the tourist area in southern Bali, the Ubud area is less densely populated by locals. However, tourists far outnumber locals, with the Gianyar regency seeing 3,842,663 tourist arrivals in 2017 - 1.3 million alone visiting Ubud Monkey Forest.

== Culture ==
The town and area have several art museums, including the Blanco Renaissance Museum, the Puri Lukisan Museum, the Neka Art Museum, and the Agung Rai Museum of Art. The Museum Rudana in Peliatan is nearby. Galleries promoting local and overseas crafts abound in Ubud, too. Some often hold exhibitions focused on stimulating dialogue between local and international artists, rather than on selling artworks. One of the primary examples is BIASA ArtSpace, founded by art enthusiast and fashion designer Susanna Perini.

The 'Tek Tok' is a traditional Balinese dance that is accompanied by the musical sound of mouth 'Tek Tok', along with various combinations of body movement and other sounds. The story Draupadi Parwa told in the Tek Tok Dance conveys a moral message: when a woman who embodies the values of patience, sacrifice, compassion, devotion, and holy sincerity is disrespected, disasters and calamities will befall a kingdom or state. This story also conveys the message that God will always protect truth, virtue, devotion, and genuine compassion. The Tek Tok dance performance is held regularly at the Bali Culture Center (BCC) in Ubud four times a week. Ubud Writers and Readers Festival (UWRF) is held annually and attracts writers and readers from around the world.

Many Balinese dances are performed around Ubud, including the Legong by the Peliatan Dance Group, the first troupe to travel abroad.

== Climate ==
Ubud has a tropical rainforest climate (Af).

Climate data for Ubud
Month	Jan	Feb	Mar	Apr	May	Jun	Jul	Aug	Sep	Oct	Nov	Dec	Year
Mean daily maximum °C (°F)	29.7 (85.5)	29.9 (85.8)	29.9 (85.8)	30.5 (86.9)	30.2 (86.4)	29.5 (85.1)	28.8 (83.8)	29.0 (84.2)	29.7 (85.5)	30.4 (86.7)	30.5 (86.9)	30.1 (86.2)	29.9 (85.7)
Daily mean °C (°F)	25.7 (78.3)	25.8 (78.4)	25.6 (78.1)	25.7 (78.3)	25.4 (77.7)	24.7 (76.5)	24.2 (75.6)	24.4 (75.9)	25.0 (77.0)	25.6 (78.1)	25.9 (78.6)	25.8 (78.4)	25.3 (77.6)
Mean daily minimum °C (°F)	21.7 (71.1)	21.7 (71.1)	21.4 (70.5)	21.0 (69.8)	20.7 (69.3)	19.9 (67.8)	19.7 (67.5)	19.8 (67.6)	20.3 (68.5)	20.9 (69.6)	21.4 (70.5)	21.6 (70.9)	20.8 (69.5)
Average precipitation mm (inches)	325 (12.8)	292 (11.5)	215 (8.5)	108 (4.3)	124 (4.9)	129 (5.1)	175 (6.9)	90 (3.5)	123 (4.8)	170 (6.7)	201 (7.9)	292 (11.5)	2,244 (88.4)
Source: Climate-Data.org

== Administration ==
Ubud kecamatan/district is made up of the following desa (villages): Kedewatan, Sayan, Singakerta, Peliatan, Mas, Lodtunduh, Petulu, Padang tegal, and Ubud itself.

== Nature ==
The Mandala Suci Wenara Wana is known to Westerners as the Ubud Monkey Forest. The grounds contain an active temple and are located near the southern end of Monkey Forest Street. This protected area houses the Pura Dalem Agung Padangtegal, and as of June 2017, approximately 750 crab-eating macaques (Macaca fascicularis) monkeys live there.

The Campuhan Ridge Walk is a hill in nearby Campuhan, from where one can see two rivers, Tukad Yeh Wos Kiwa and Tukad Yeh Wos Tengen, merge. A one-meter-wide paved-block track runs about 2 kilometers to the top of the hill, a popular spot to watch the sunset.

Goa Gajah, also known as the Elephant Cave, features intricate carvings and a tranquil meditation cave.

Tegunungan Waterfall is one of the highest waterfalls in the Ubud area of Bali. At more than 40 meters high, this waterfall is surrounded by green scenery.
