= Gianyar Regency =

Regency in Bali, Indonesia

Gianyar Regency Kabupaten Gianyar
- Regency

Native transcription(s)
  - Balinese: ᬓᬪᬹᬧᬢᬾᬦ᭄ᬕ᭄ᬬᬜᬃ Kabupatén Gyañaŕ
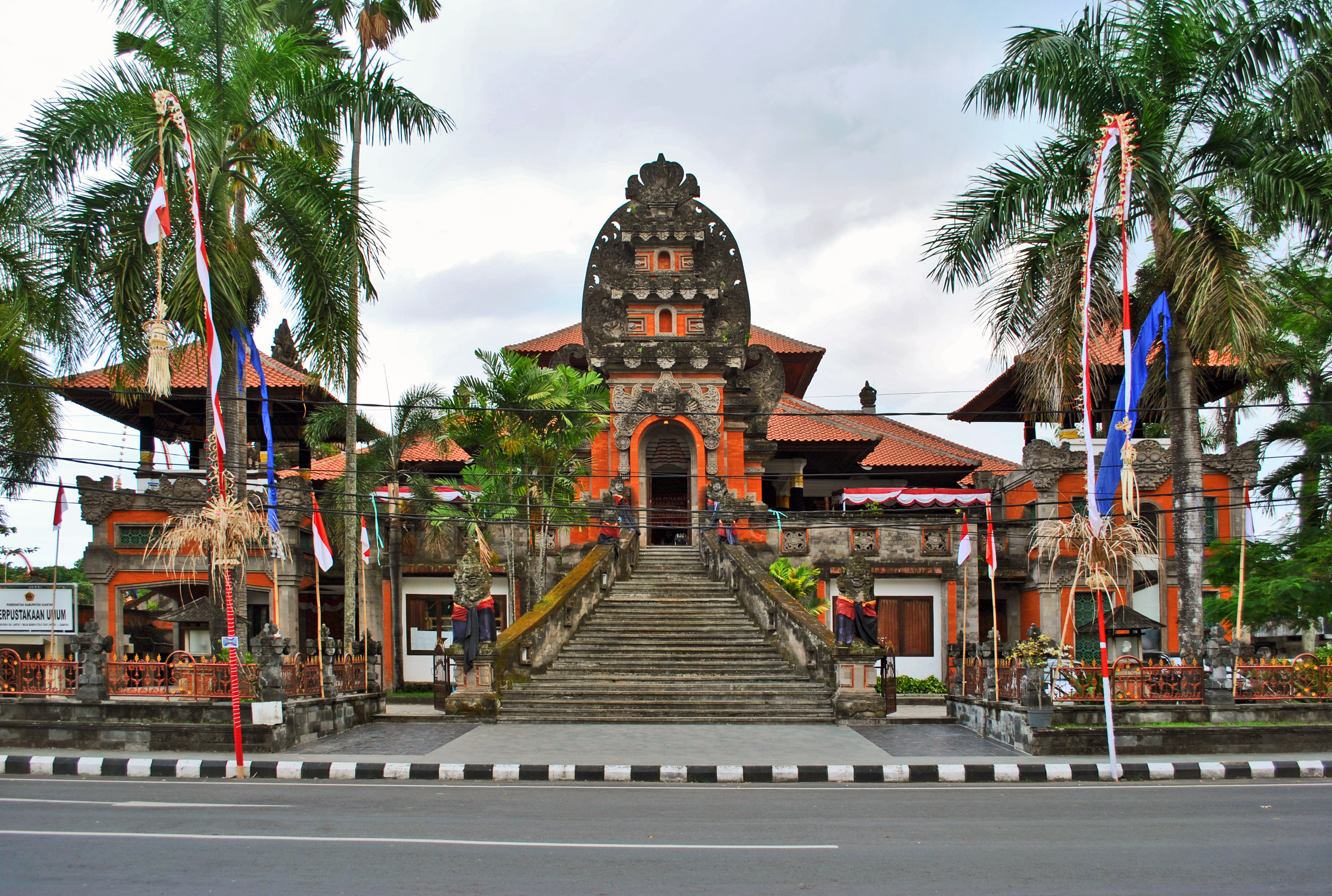
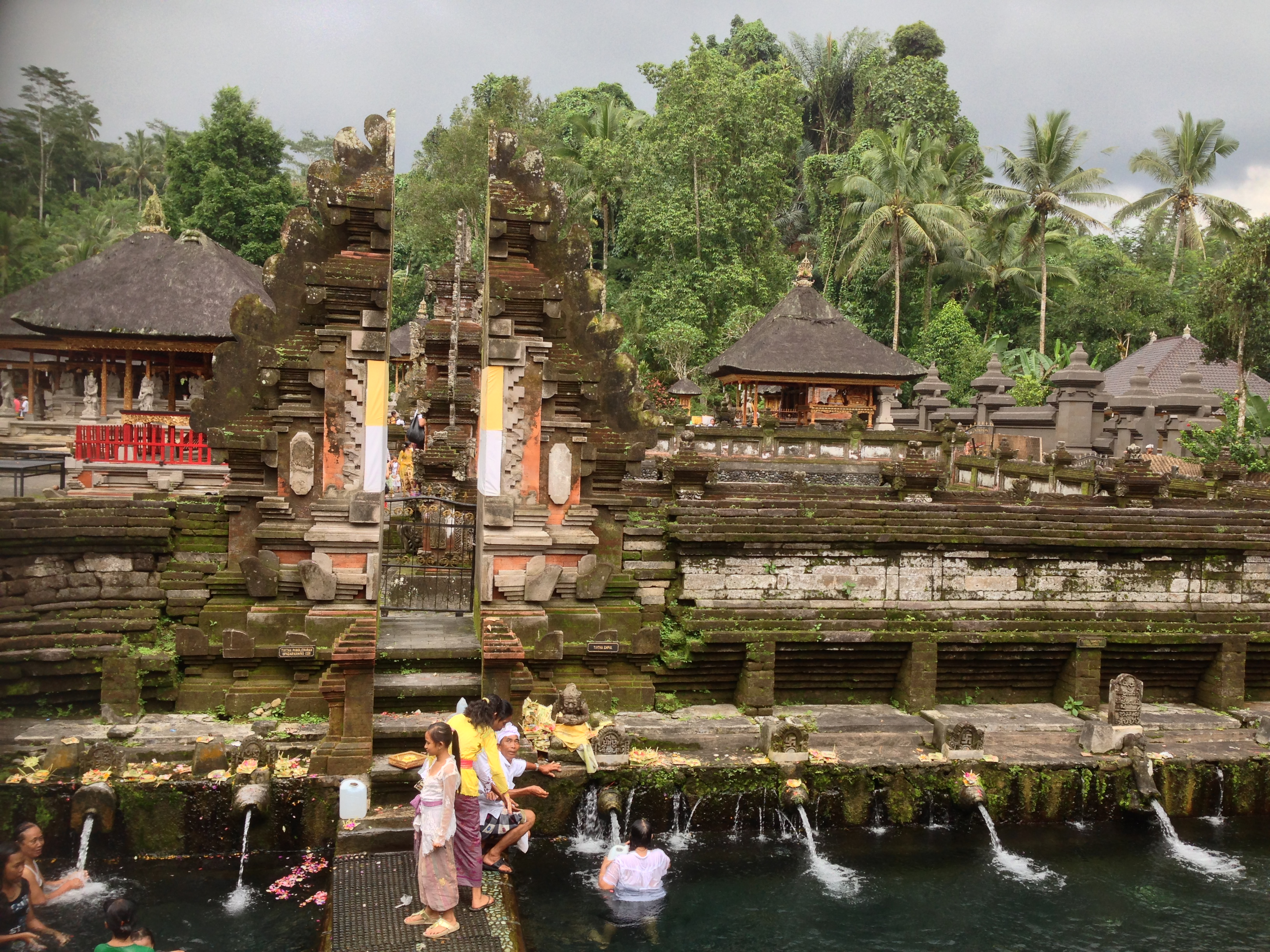
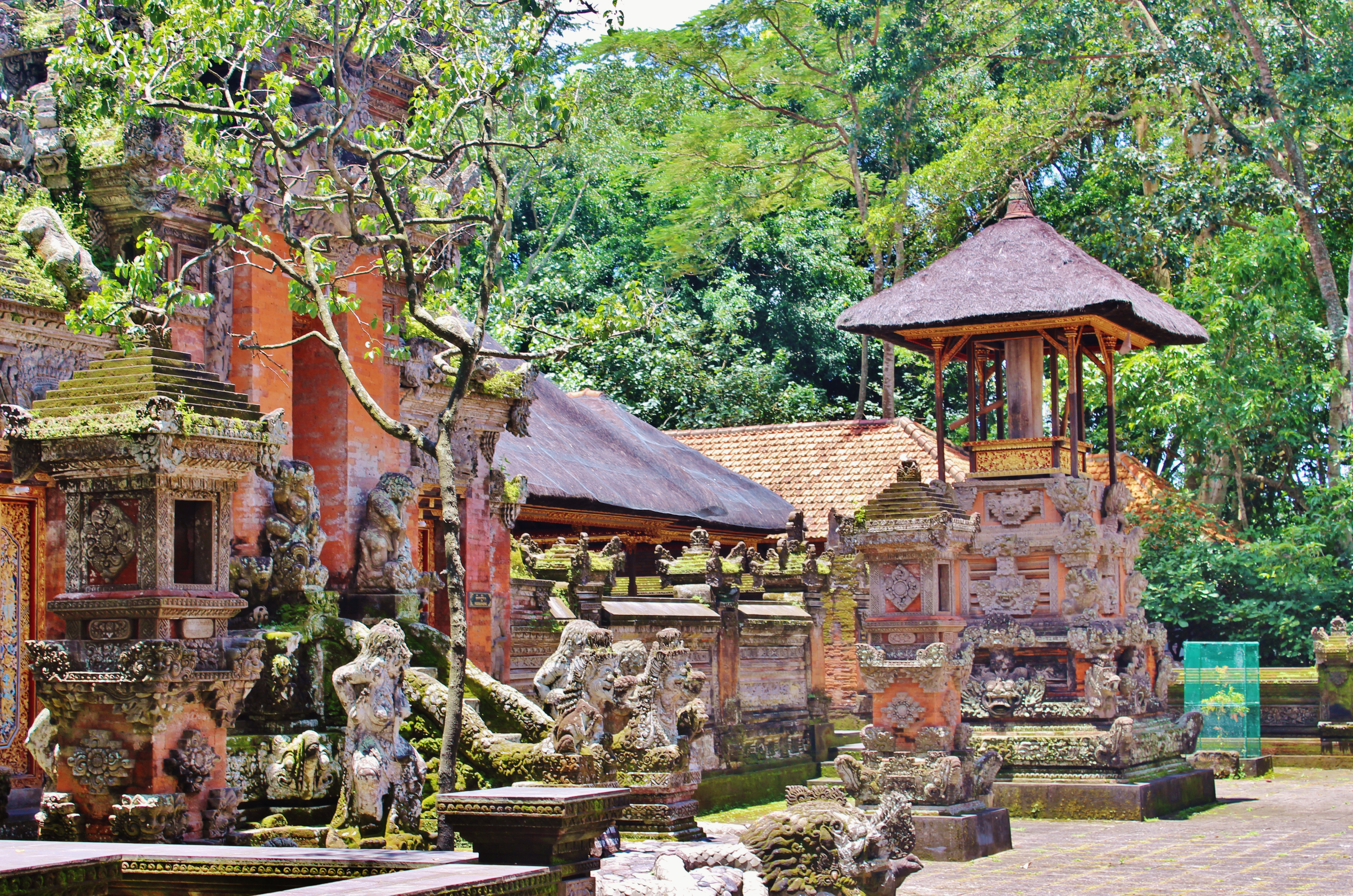
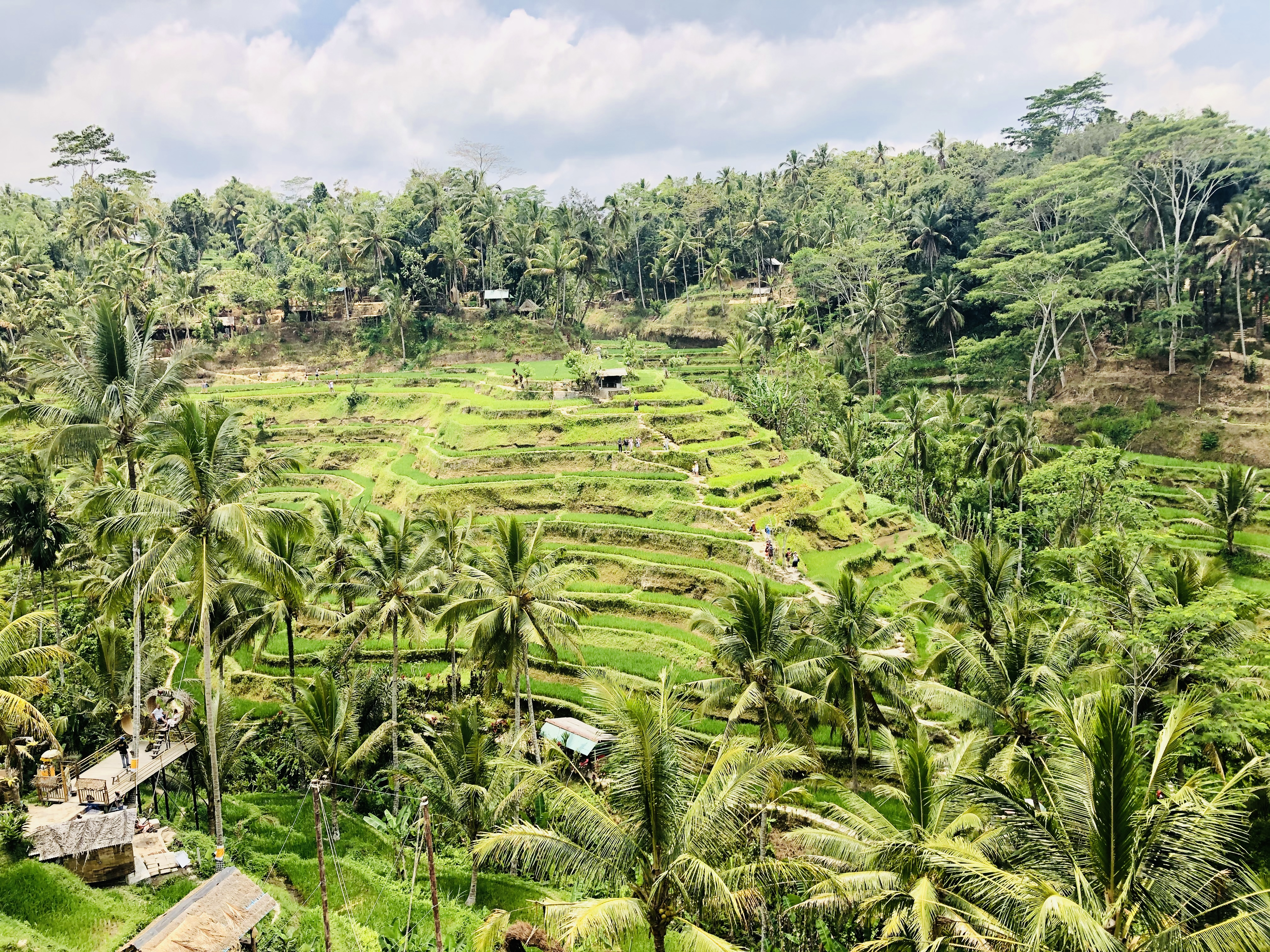
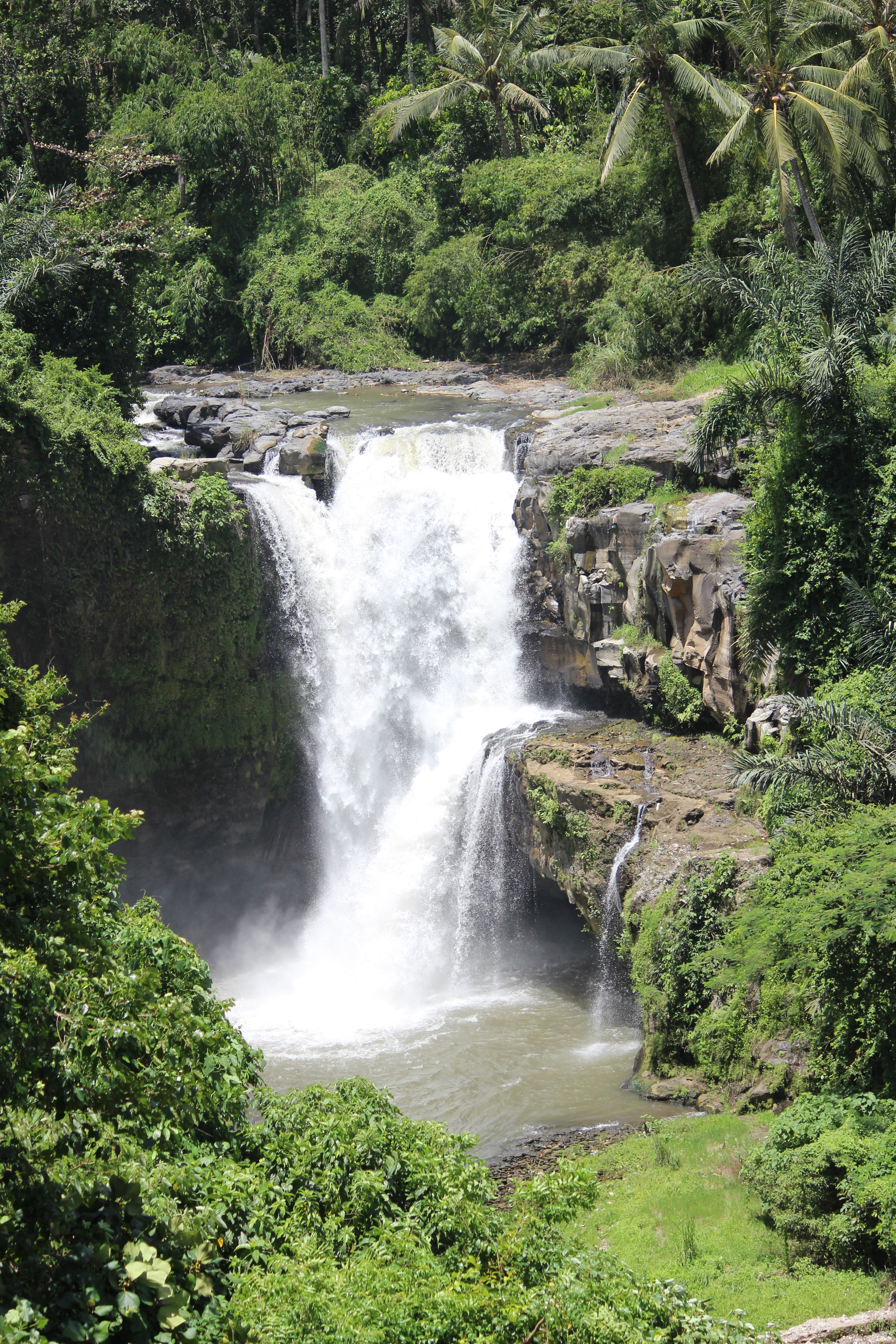
- Gianyar Regional Library Tirta Empul Temple Ubud Monkey Forest Terracing in Tegallalang Tegenungan Waterfall

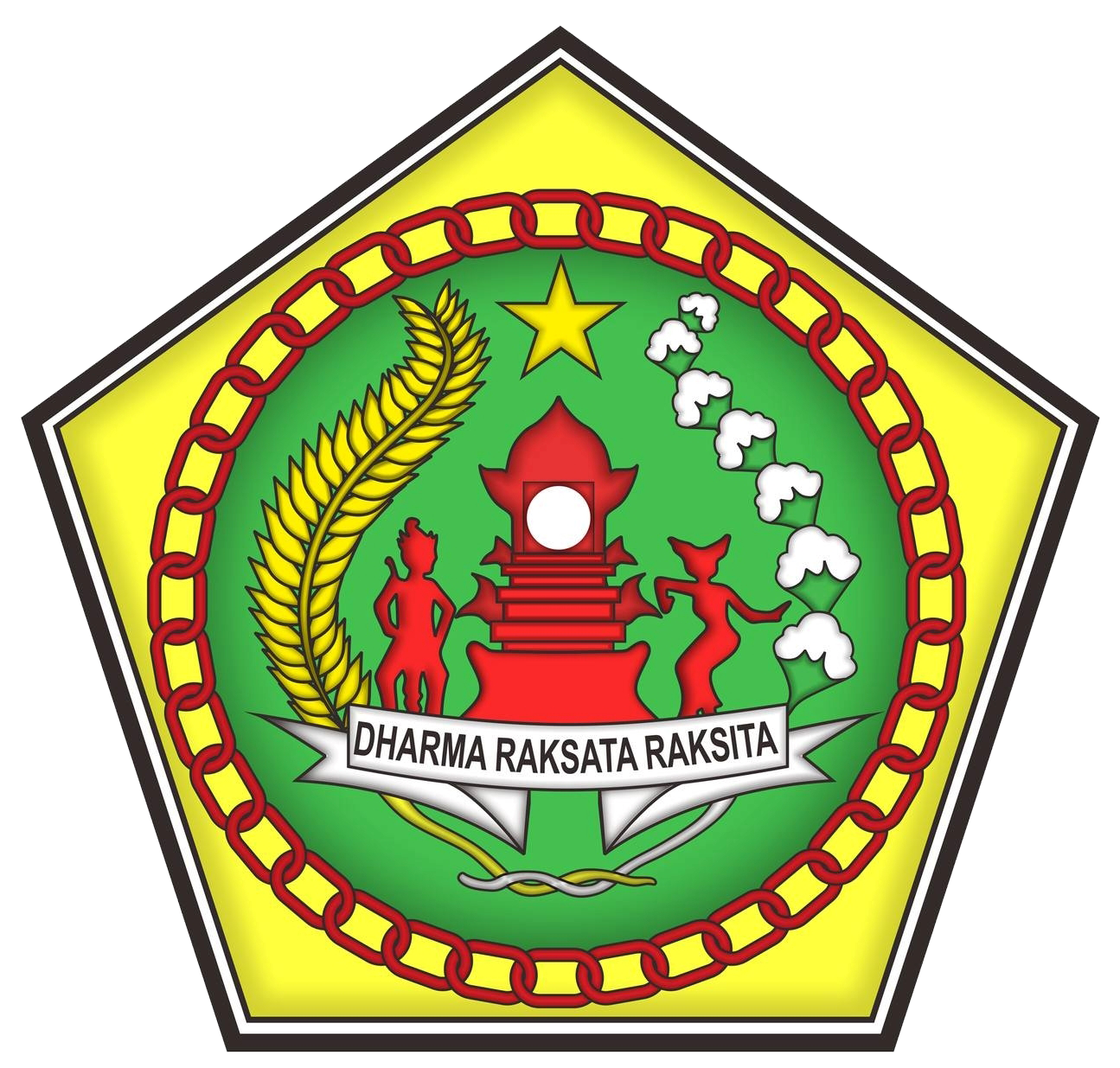
- Coat of arms
- Nicknames: Gumi Seni ('Land of Arts')
- Motto(s): Dhaŕma Rakṣaṭa Rakṣita (Sanskrit) ᬟᬃᬫᬭᬓ᭄ᬱᬝᬭᬓ᭄ᬱᬶᬢ "Whoever does Good will be Protected by Goodness itself"
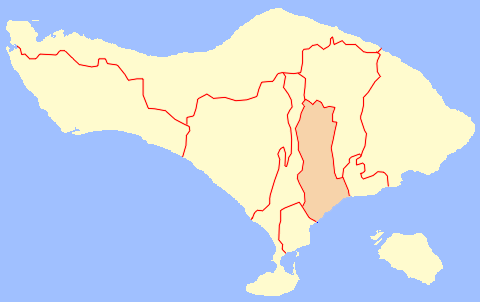
- Location within Bali

- Location in Bali Location in Lesser Sunda Islands Location in Indonesia Location in Southeast Asia Location in Asia
- Coordinates: 8°32′38.76″S 115°19′31.66″E
- Country: Indonesia
- Region: Lesser Sunda Islands
- Province: Bali
- Metropolitan area: Sarbagita
- Districts: List: Sukawati; Blahbatuh; Gianyar; Tampaksiring; Ubud; Tegallalang; Payangan
- Established: 14 August 1958
- Capital: Gianyar

Government
  - Body: Gianyar Regency Government
  - Regent: I Made Agus Mahayastra (PDI-P)
  - Vice Regent: Anak Agung Gde Mayun
  - Legislature: Gianyar Regency Regional House of Representatives (DPRD)

Area
  - Total: 368 km^{2} (142 sq mi)

Population (mid 2022 estimate)
  - Total: 523,972
  - Density: 1,420/km^{2} (3,690/sq mi)

Demographics
  - Ethnic groups (2010): 96.75% Balinese; 1.83% Javanese; 0.20% Sasak; 0.13% Bali Aga; 0.11% Sundanese; 0.10% Chinese; 0.08% Bugis; 0.07% Madurese; 0.01% Malays; 0.02% Batak; 0.77% other
  - Religion (2024): 96.57% Hinduism; 2.31% Islam; 0.87% Christianity; 0.59% Protestanism; 0.28% Catholicism; 0.23% Buddhism; 0.01% Confucianism
  - Languages and dialects: Indonesian (official); Balinese (native); Lowland Balinese; Gianyar Balinese other
- Time zone: UTC+8 (ICST)
- Area code: (+62) 361
- ISO 3166 code: ID-GI
- Vehicle registration: DK
- HDI (2023): ▲0.792 high
- Website: gianyarkab.go.id

Gianyar Regency (Indonesian: Kabupaten Gianyar; Balinese: ᬓᬪᬹᬧᬢᬾᬦ᭄ᬕ᭄ᬬᬜᬃ, Kabupatén Gyañaŕ) is a regency (kabupaten) of the province of Bali, Indonesia. It has an area of 368.0 km^{2} and had a population 523,973 at mid of 2022 census. It is bordered by Badung Regency and Denpasar City to its west, Bangli Regency and Klungkung Regency to its east and the Badung Strait and the Indian Ocean to its south. Its regency seat is the town of Gianyar.

The town of Ubud, a centre of art and tourism, is located in Gianyar Regency.

== History ==
The history of Gianyar Regency is determined by the Regional Regulation of Gianyar Regency Number 9 of 2004, dated 2 April 2004 concerning the Anniversary of Gianyar Regency.

History 2.5 centuries more, precisely 252 years ago, 19 April 1771, when Gianyar was chosen as the name of a palace, Puri Agung, namely the King's Palace (Anak Agung) by Ida Dewa Manggis Sakti, then a sovereign and autonomous kingdom was born and participated in the power struggle of the kingdoms in Bali. In fact, the functioning of a palace, namely the Puri Agung Gianyar which has been determined by the conditions of the niskala scale which fell on 19 April 1771 is a historical milestone that has been built by the king (Ida Anak Agung) Gianyar I, Ida Dewata Manggis Sakti gave us the condition that the process of becoming and existing can be pulled back (previous period) or pulled forward (after period).

=== Kingdom period ===
Based on archaeological evidence in the Gianyar area, it is estimated that the emergence of human settlements in Gianyar occurred 2,000 years ago with the discovery of tool sites (artifacts) in the form of stones, bronze metal in the form of nekara (Bulan Pejeng), reliefs depicting the life of temples or caves on the cliffs of the Pakerisan river (tukad).

After written evidence was found in the form of inscriptions on stone or metal, the sites of the royal centres of the Warmadewa dynasty were identified at the Singamandawa Palace, Bedahulu. After the Gajah Mada (Majapahit) expedition was able to control the island of Bali, a Keraton Samprangan was built in the former headquarters of his troops as the centre of government of the kingdom held by the Five Balinese Kings, namely:

1. King Adipati Ida Dalem Krena Kepakisan (1350–1380), as the forerunner of the Kresna Kepakisan dynasty, then the Keraton Samprangan was able to survive for approximately three centuries.
2. Ida Dalem Ketut Ngulesir (1380–1460)
3. Ida Dalem Waturenggong (1460–1550)
4. Ida Dalem Sagening (1580–1625)
5. Ida Dalem Dimade (1625–1651).

The last two Balinese Kings, namely Ida Dalem Segening and Ida Dalem Dimade, have given rise to the forerunners of rulers in the regions. Ida Dewa Manggis Kuning (1600s) the ruler of Beng Village was the forerunner of the Manggis Dynasty which emerged after the second generation built the Payangan Kingdom (1735–1843). One of the sons of the king of Klungkung Ida Dewa Agung Jambe named Ida Dewa Agung Anom emerged as the forerunner of the dynasty of kings in Sukawati (1711–1771) including Peliatan and Ubud. In the same period, namely the Gelgel period, other regional rulers also emerged, namely I Gusti Ngurah Jelantik who controlled Blahbatuh and then I Gusti Agung Maruti who controlled the Keramas area, both of whom were descendants of Arya Kepakisan.

=== Colonialism period ===
The dynamics of the struggle between traditional elites from generation to generation have progressed at a certain momentum, one of which is the development of a palace city or royal city as the centre of the kingdom's government called Gianyar. The development of a sovereign and fully autonomous royal city is Ida Dewa Manggis Sakti, the 4th generation of Ida Dewa Manggis Kuning.

Since the establishment of Puri Agung Gianyar on 19 April 1771, as well as the capital of the Gianyar Kingdom Government Center, it is a historical milestone. Since then and during the period afterward, the sovereign Gianyar Kingdom has also filled the pages of history of the kingdoms in Bali, consisting of nine kingdoms in Klungkung, Karangasem, Buleleng, Mengwi, Bangli, Payangan, Badung, Tabanan and Gianyar. However, until the end of the 19th century, after the collapse of Payangan and Mengwi on the one hand and the emergence of Jembrana on the other hand, the State): Klungkung, Karangasem, Bangli and Gianyar (ENI, 1917).

=== Early Independence Period ===
When the Dutch had taken control of the entire island of Bali, the 8 former kingdoms were still recognised by the Government of Guberneurmen but as part of the Dutch East Indies headed by a king (Selfbestuurder) in their respective swapraja regions. During the revolution, when the Bali region was included in the State of East Indonesia (NIT) autonomous regional kingdom (Swapraja) into an institution called Oka, the King of Gianyar was appointed as Chairman of the Council of Kings replacing the year 1947.

In addition, during the NIT period two other figures, namely Tjokorde Gde Raka Sukawati (Puri Kantor Ubud) became President of NIT and Ida A.A. Gde Agung (Puri Agung Gianyar) became Prime Minister of NIT, When the Republic of the United States of Indonesia (RIS) returned to the Unitary State (NKRI) on 17 August 1950, then the regions throughout Indonesia were issued Law No. I of 1957, the implementation of which was regulated by Law No. 69 of 1958 which changed the Swatantra Region Level II (Daswati II). The name Daswati II applied uniformly throughout Indonesia until 1960. The first regent in DATI II Gianyar was Tjokorda Ngurah (1960–1963). The next regents were Drh. Tjokorda Anom Pudak (1963–1964) and Regent I Made Sayoga, BA (1964–1965). When Law No. 18 of 1965 was implemented, DATI II was changed to the name DATI II Regency. Then it was perfected by the issuance of Law No. 5 of 1974 which replaced the name of the Regency. The regional head is still called Regent.

=== Gianyar Regency Government Period ===
From the autonomy side, it is clear that the development process that occurred in Gianyar City. Autonomy and full sovereignty have been attached to the Kingdom Government since 19 April 1771, then processed until Regional Autonomy at Level II Regency which is in effect until now.

Various leadership styles and governing arts in the autonomy system have been partitioned on the pages of Gianyar City History. The process of autonomy dynamics is quite long since 19 April 1771 until 19 April 2023 today, since the palace city was built as the centre of government of the autonomous kingdom to a district city, the name Gianyar is immortalised. Until now it has been 252 years old, the leaders of the city area, from the king (kingdom) to the Regent (Regency), have their own characteristics and styles and art of governing in the land of artists. Artists who are always down to earth in Gianyar and even worldwide.

== Government and politics ==
No.	Regent	Start of Term	End of Term	Vice Regent
12	I Made Agus Mahayastra	20 February 2025	Incumbent	Anak Agung Gde Mayun

The regent of Gianyar is the highest officeholder in the Gianyar Regency government. The Regent of Gianyar is responsible to the governor of the province of Bali. Currently, the regent or regional head serving in Gianyar Regency is I Made Agus Mahayastra, accompanied by the vice regent Anak Agung Gde Mayun who have served since 2018. Agus Mahayastra and Gde Mayun ran in the 2018 Gianyar regency election and 2024 Gianyar regency election.

=== Parliament ===
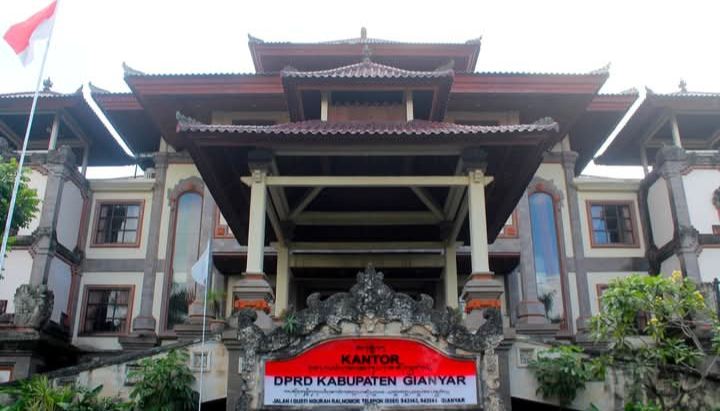
Gianyar's parliament (DPRD) building

=== Administrative districts ===
The regency is divided into seven districts (kecamatan), tabulated below with their areas and population totals from the 2010 Census and the 2020 Census, together with the official estimates as of mid-2022. The table also includes the number of administrative villages in each district (a total of 64 rural desa and 6 urban kelurahan), and its postal codes. The administrative centre of each district bears the same name as the district it is in.

Kode Wilayah	Name of District (kecamatan)	Area in km^{2}	Pop'n Census 2010	Pop'n Census 2020	Pop'n Estimate mid 2022	No. of villages	Post codes
51.04.01	Sukawati	55.02	110,429	119,975	121,700	12	80582
51.04.02	Blahbatuh	39.70	65,875	74,093	75,700	9	80581
51.04.03	Gianyar (district and town)	50.59	86,843	101,444	104,400	17 ^{(a)}	80511–90515
51.04.04	Tampaksiring	42.63	45,818	50,864	51,800	8	80552
51.04.05	Ubud	42.38	69,323	71,568	71,900	8 ^{(b)}	80571
51.04.06	Tegallalang	61.80	50,325	52,257	52,600	7	80561
51.04.07	Payangan	75.88	41,164	45,143	45,900	9	80572
	Totals	368.00	469,777	515,344	523,972	70	

Notes: (a) comprises 5 kelurahan and 12 desa. (b) including one kelurahan – the town of Ubud.

The four southern districts (Sukawati, Blahbatuh, Gianyar, and Ubud) are included within the official metropolitan area of Greater Denpasar (Sarbagita), while the three northern districts (Tampaksiring, Tegallalang, and Payangan) are excluded.

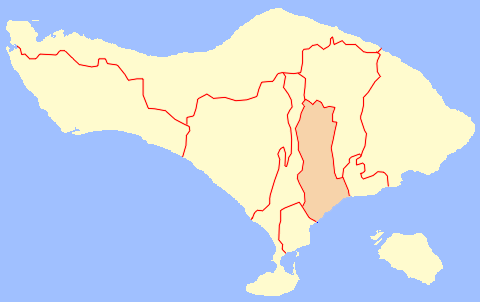
Map of Gianyar Regency in Bali

Map of districts in Gianyar Regency

List of districts and villages in Gianyar Regency as follows:

Code	Districts	Urban villages	Rural Villages	Status	List
51.04.02	Blahbatuh	-	9	Desa	Bedulu; Belega; Blahbatuh; Bona; Buruan; Keramas; Medahan; Pering; Saba
51.04.03	Gianyar	5	12	Desa	Bakbakan; Lebih; Petak; Petak Kaja; Serongga; Siangan; Sidan; Sumita; Suwat; Tegal Tugu; Temesi; Tulikup
51.04.03	Gianyar	5	12	Kelurahan	Abianbase; Beng; Bitera; Gianyar; Samplangan
51.04.07	Payangan	-	9	Desa	Bresela; Buahan; Buahan Kaja; Bukian; Kelusa; Kerta; Melinggih; Melinggih Kelod; Puhu
51.04.01	Sukawati	-	12	Desa	Batuan; Batuan Kaler; Batubulan; Batubulan Kangin; Celuk; Guwang; Kemenuh; Ketewel; Singapadu; Singapadu Kaler; Singapadu Tengah; Sukawati
51.04.04	Tampaksiring	-	8	Desa	Manukaya; Pejeng; Pejeng Kaja; Pejeng Kangin; Pejeng Kawan; Pejeng Kelod; Sanding; Tampaksiring
51.04.06	Tegallalang	-	7	Desa	Kedisan; Keliki; Kendran; Pupuan; Sebatu; Taro; Tegallalang
51.04.05	Ubud	1	7	Desa	Kedewatan; Lodtunduh; Mas; Peliatan; Petulu; Sayan; Singakerta
51.04.05	Ubud	1	7	Kelurahan	Ubud
	TOTAL	6	64		

== Demographics ==
=== Religion ===
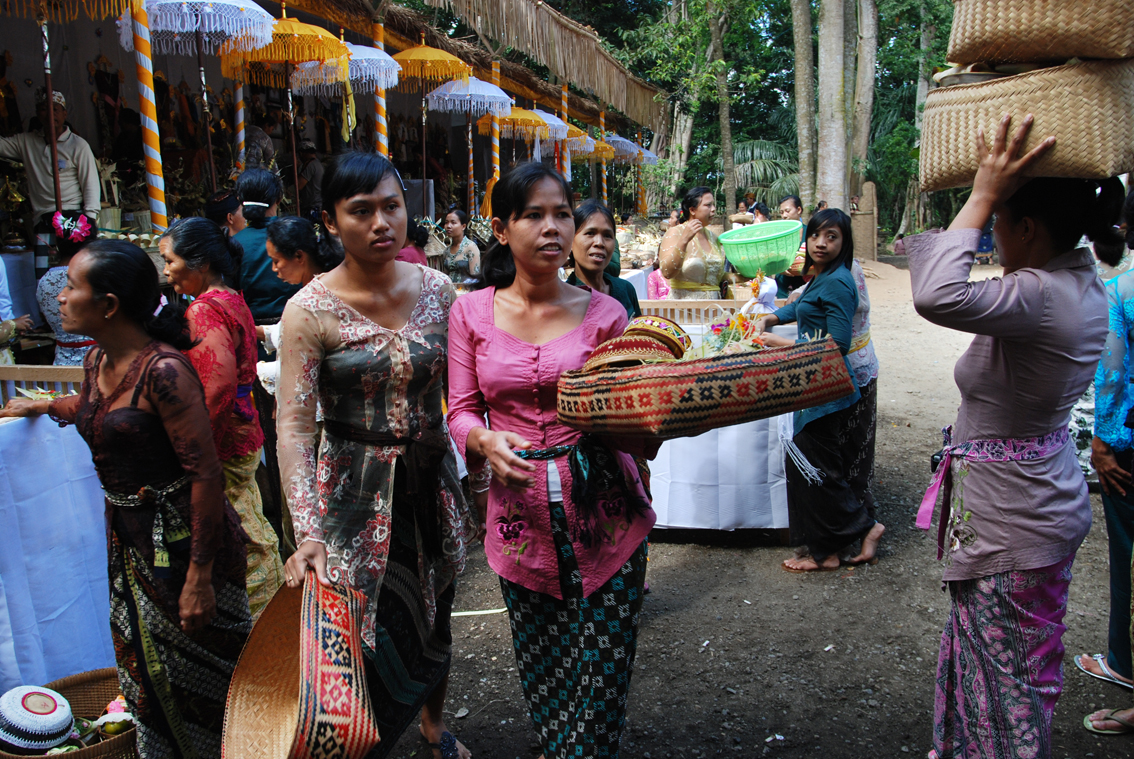
Religious ceremony of Hindu people in Ubud Monkey Forest, Gianyar

The civil registry survey of April 2011 listed 480,447 people, of which 469,929 were classified as Hindu.

=== Ethnic groups ===
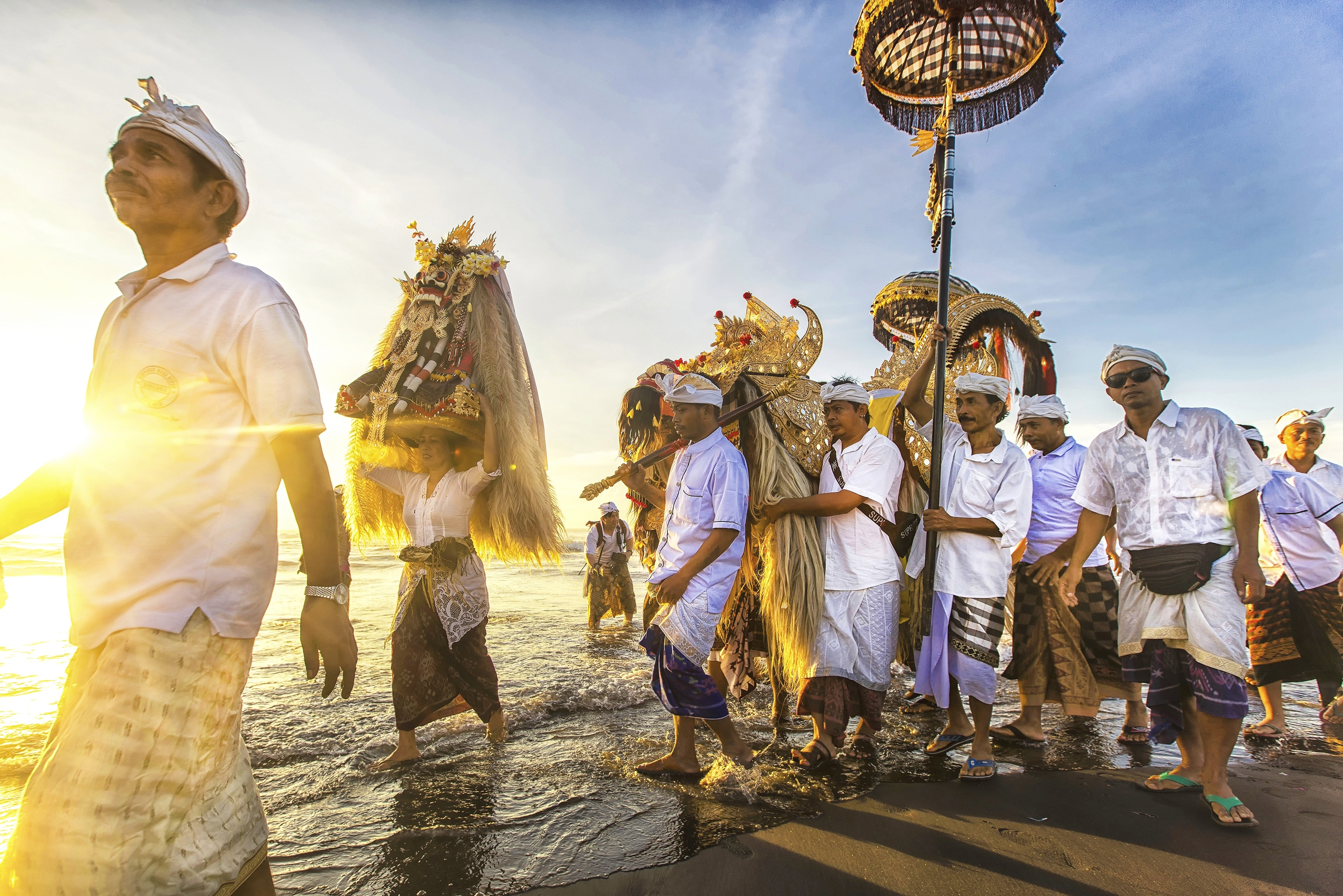
Melasti Ceremony in Gianyar

Most of the ethnic groups in Gianyar are Balinese. Based on data from the Central Bureau of Statistics in the 2010 Indonesian Population Census, as many as 95.27% of the 496,777 inhabitants of Gianyar Regency are of the Balinese ethnic group. Then the Javanese as much as 3.26%, and several others such as the Sasak, Sundanese, Madurese, and other ethnic groups.

Here are population of Gianyar regency based on ethnicity in 2010:

No.	Ethnic groups	Pop.	Pct. (%)
1	Balinese	447,547	95.27%
2	Javanese	15,324	3.26%
3	Sasak	1,512	0.32%
4	Sundanese	801	0.17%
5	Bali Aga	696	0.15%
6	Madurese	500	0.11%
7	Chinese	416	0.09%
8	Flores	146	0.02%
9	Bugis	93	0.02%
10	Malays	86	0.02%
11	Others	2,656	0.57%
	Gianyar Regency	469,777	100%

== Tourism ==
Tourism is the main economic sector of Gianyar Regency, tourism is the mainstay of the economy of this regency.

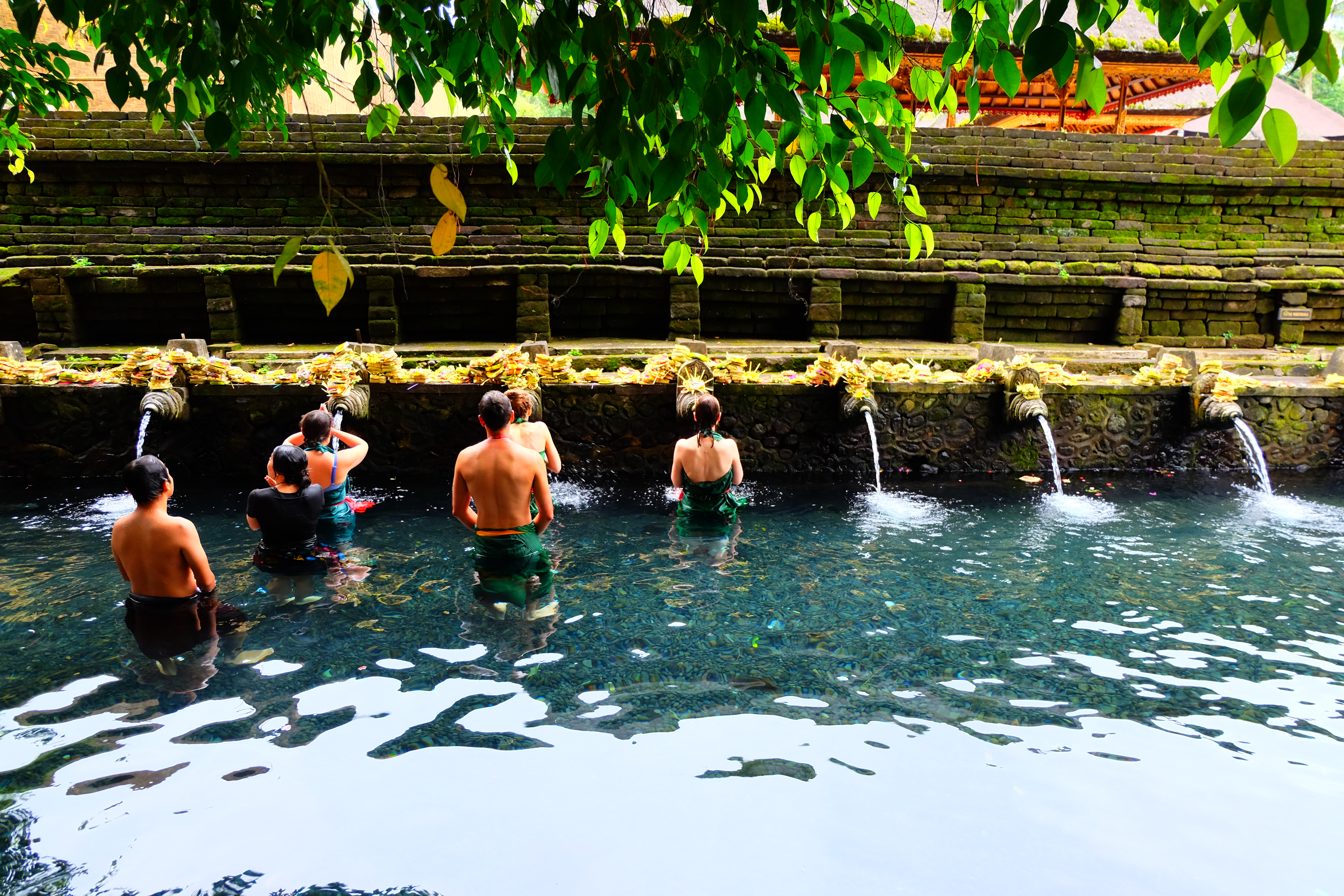
Tirta Empul Temple.

=== Keramas Beach ===
Keramas Beach in Blahbatuh has hosted international surfing competitions in the last couple of years with limited facilities such as uneven roads and no parking lots. On 18–29 June 2013, Keramas Beach was on the Association of Surfing Professionals (ASP)'s 2013 Men's World Championship Tour schedule as the Oakley Bali Pro.

Here are some of the tourist attractions in Gianyar Regency:

- Tegenungan Waterfall
- Bali Bird Park
- Bali Safari & Marine Park
- Taman Nusa–Indonesian Cultural Heritage Center
- Batuan Village
- Batubulan Village
- Celuk Village
- Mas Village
- Elephant Cave
- Gunung Kawi Temple
- Ubud Monkey Forest
- Sukawati Market
- Tampaksiring
- Ubud
- Guwang art market
- Sukawati traditional village art market
- Ketewel Beach
- Purnama Beach
- Lebih Beach
- Masceti Beach
- Saba Beach
- Keramas Beach
- Bali Zoo
- Bali Bird Park
- Payogan Agung Temple
- Museum of Antiquities
- Beji Guwang, Ketewel
- Kapten I Wayan Dipta Stadium
- Gianyar City Park
- Samuan Tiga Temple
- Ceking terraces
- Tirta Empul Temple
- Sebatu Temple
- Tampaksiring Palace
- Sukawati Market
- Kerobokan Cliff Temple

== Sports ==
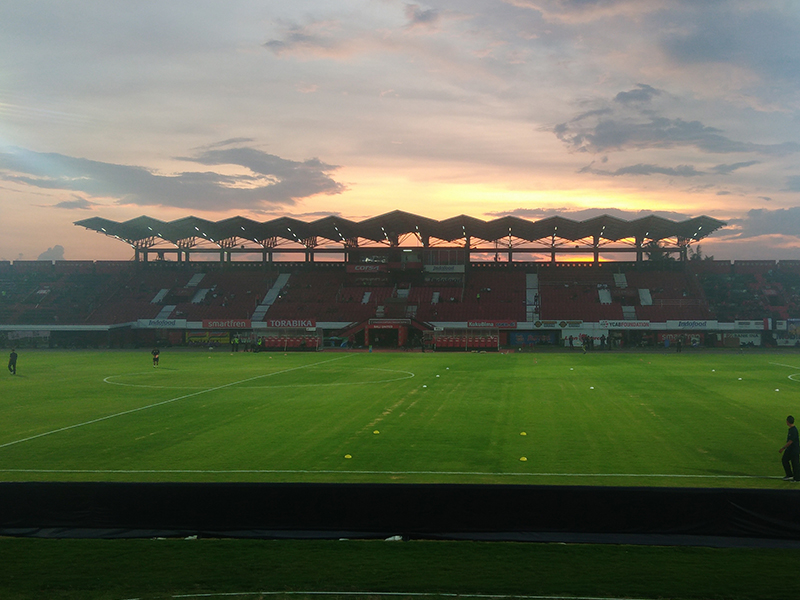
Kapten I Wayan Dipta Stadium

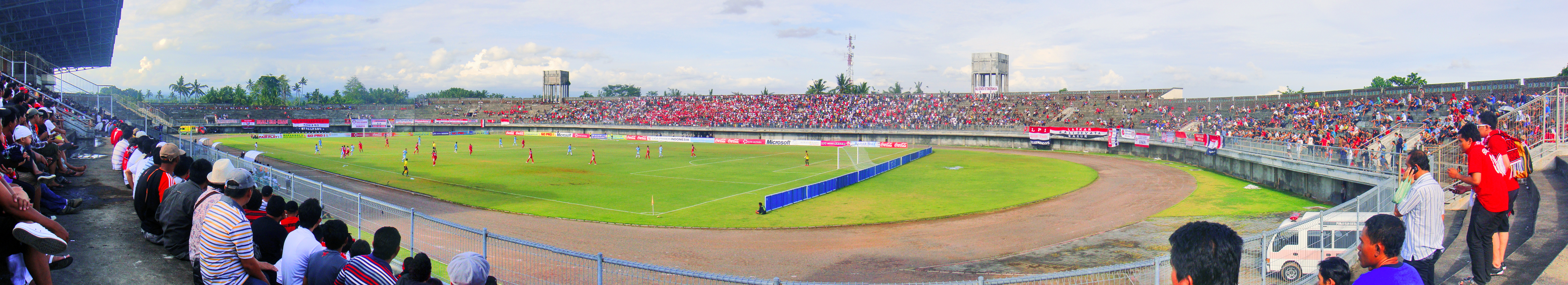
Kapten I Wayan Dipta Stadium Field

In football, Bali is home to the football club Bali United, which plays in the Super League, the top tier of the Indonesian football league. The team was relocated from Samarinda, East Kalimantan, to Gianyar, Bali. Harbiansyah Hanafiah, the main commissioner of Bali United, explained that he did the name change and moved the home to Bali because there were no representatives from Bali in the highest football tier in Indonesia. Another reason was that local fans in Samarinda preferred to support Pusamania Borneo F.C. more than Persisam.

== Geography ==
=== Climate ===
Gianyar has a tropical rainforest climate (Af) with moderate to heavy rainfall year-round. The following climate data is for the town of Gianyar.

Climate data for Gianyar
Month	Jan	Feb	Mar	Apr	May	Jun	Jul	Aug	Sep	Oct	Nov	Dec	Year
Mean daily maximum °C (°F)	30.3 (86.5)	30.5 (86.9)	30.6 (87.1)	31.1 (88.0)	30.8 (87.4)	30.0 (86.0)	29.3 (84.7)	29.6 (85.3)	30.3 (86.5)	31.0 (87.8)	31.1 (88.0)	30.7 (87.3)	30.4 (86.8)
Daily mean °C (°F)	26.4 (79.5)	26.5 (79.7)	26.4 (79.5)	26.4 (79.5)	26.1 (79.0)	25.2 (77.4)	24.8 (76.6)	25.0 (77.0)	25.7 (78.3)	26.4 (79.5)	26.6 (79.9)	26.5 (79.7)	26.0 (78.8)
Mean daily minimum °C (°F)	22.5 (72.5)	22.5 (72.5)	22.2 (72.0)	21.7 (71.1)	21.4 (70.5)	20.5 (68.9)	20.4 (68.7)	20.5 (68.9)	21.1 (70.0)	21.8 (71.2)	22.2 (72.0)	22.3 (72.1)	21.6 (70.9)
Average rainfall mm (inches)	276 (10.9)	265 (10.4)	172 (6.8)	84 (3.3)	114 (4.5)	134 (5.3)	186 (7.3)	95 (3.7)	112 (4.4)	152 (6.0)	164 (6.5)	251 (9.9)	2,005 (79)
Source: Climate-Data.org

== Education ==
- Yayasan Slukat Learning Center (2007), a non-profit foundation and school located in the village of Keramas

== Condotels and Apartments ban ==
Although Badung Regency, Denpasar City, and Gianyar Regency are the three richest regions in Bali and most of their wealth comes from tourism, in February 2012 Gianyar Regency officially banned the construction of new and increasingly popular condominium hotels ("condotels") and apartment facilities. Unlike the Badung Regency and Denpasar, where condotels and apartments remain in high demand for tourist developers and investors, Gianyar Regency wants to protect local entrepreneurs.

== Wildlife conservation ==
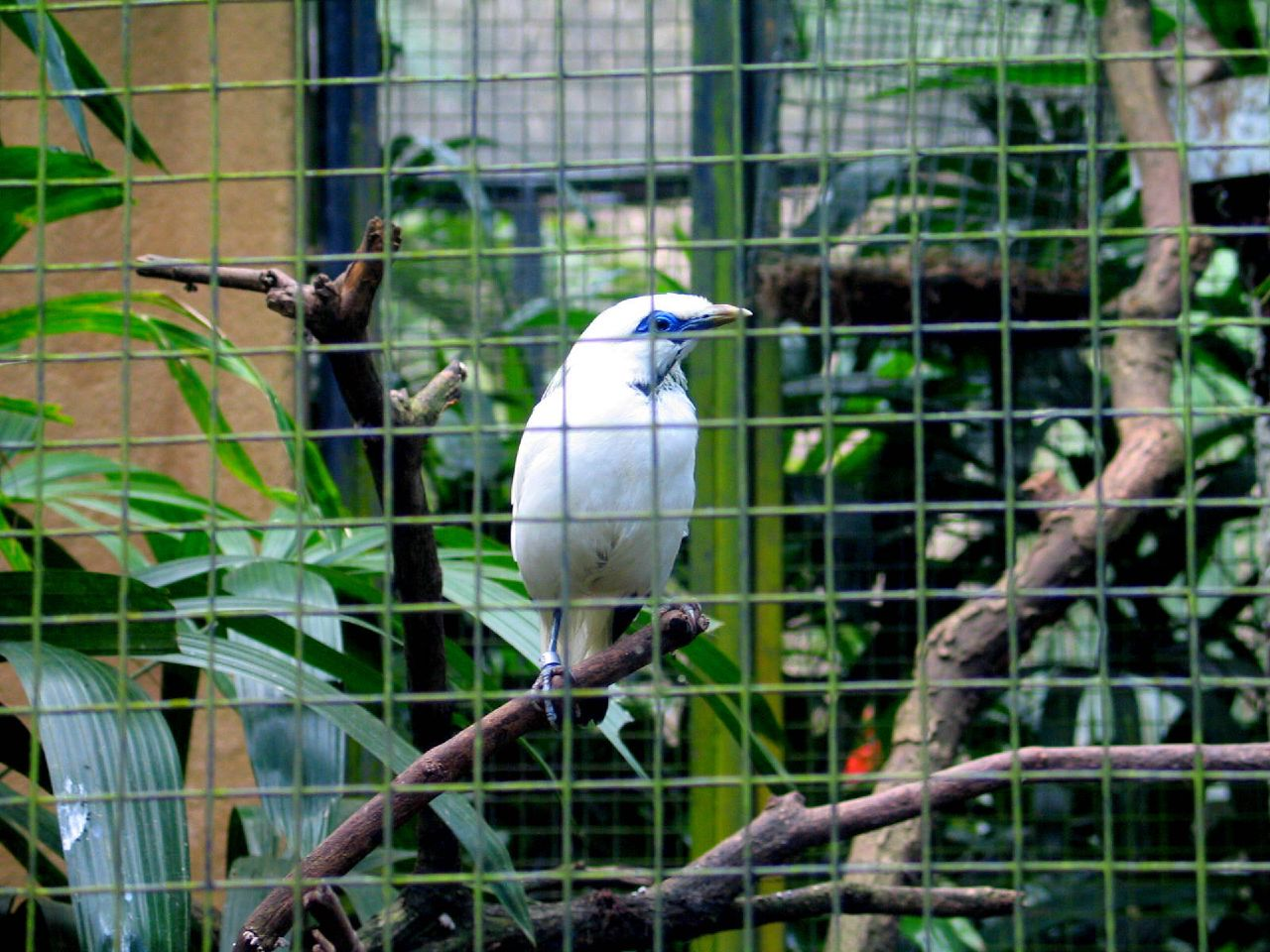
Bali myna in the cage

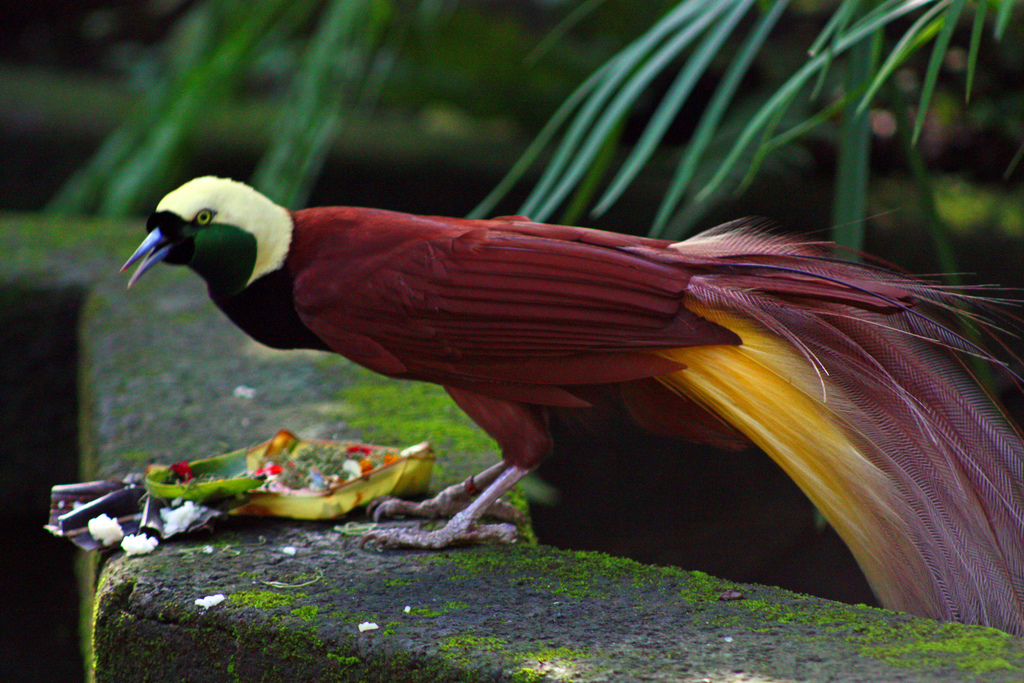
Paradisaea apoda in the bird park
