= Southeast Asian arts =

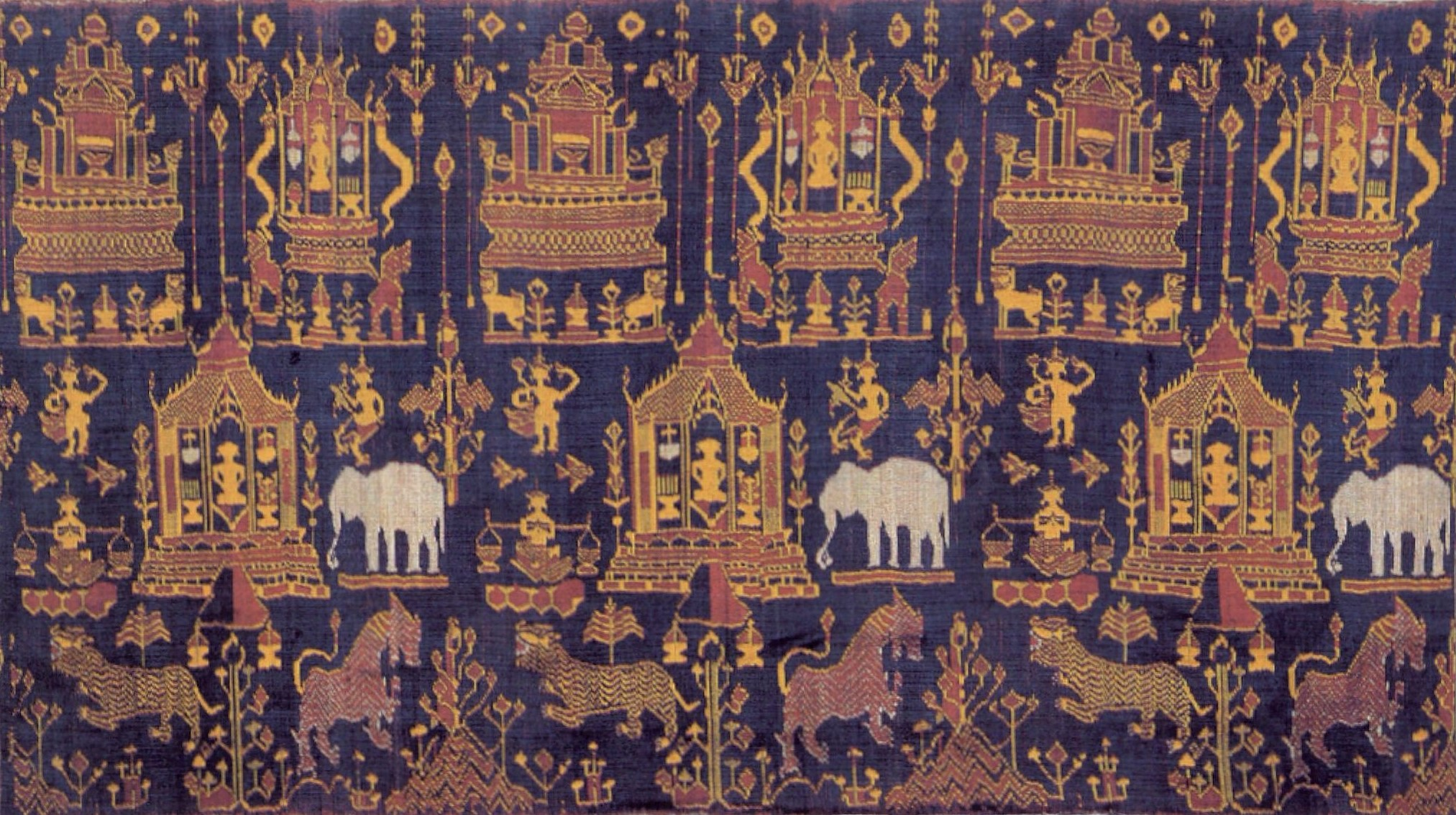
Pidan (sacred banner) from Cambodia, Khmer, 1880–1910, silk with weft ikat, Honolulu Academy of Arts

The art produced in Southeast Asia includes the art from eleven countries that form Southeast Asia. The cultural development of the area was historically dominated by Indian influence, though several cohesive traits exist before Indian influence. The art is inspired by many countries.

Crafts based on traditional artisanal practices are also an important component of art in these countries. These crafts, including textiles, ceramics, basketry, and metalwork, reflect local traditions, materials, and cultural influences from Indian, Chinese, and Islamic civilizations. Crafts in Southeast Asia are characterized by the use of local materials like bamboo, rattan, silk, and clay, with techniques honed over centuries. These practices are often tied to cultural rituals, economic activities, and community identity, distinguishing them from broader artistic traditions like dance or architecture.

== Inspiration ==
Art culture in Southeast Asia is usually inherited from the art produced in China of East Asia and India of South Asia. Some of the art culture was changed after being invaded by other colonies, such as Dutch East Indies in Indonesia.

== Countries ==
=== Brunei ===
Art in Brunei was not a focus until the early 1950s, Brunei's government then took a stand to support culture. They created a building for artists to sell their works. In 1984, the art market had grown enough that it had to move to a larger space.

Weaving skills have been passed across generations. Brunei produces fabric for making gowns and sarongs. "The weaving and decoration of cloth as well as wearing, display, and exchange of it, has been an important part of Bruneian culture for years (Orr 96)." Weaving became significant in the 15th century. Antonio Pigafetta visited Brunei during his travels and observed how the clothes were made. One example was a Jongsarat, a handmade garment used for weddings and special occasions. It typically includes a hint of silver and gold. It can be used for wall coverings.

=== Cambodia ===
The history of Cambodian art stretches back centuries to ancient times, but the most famous period is undoubtedly the Khmer art of the Khmer Empire (802–1431), especially in the area around Angkor and the mainly 12th-century temple-complex of Angkor Wat, initially Hindu and subsequently Buddhist.

Beginning in the mid-20th century, a tradition of modern art began in Cambodia, though in the later 20th century both traditional and modern arts declined for several reasons, including the killing of artists by the Khmer Rouge.

=== East Timor ===
Art in East Timor began to popularize since the violence during the 2006 East Timorese crisis. Children living in the country began graffiting walls into peace murals.

The East Timor Arts Society promotes the art in the area, and house many different artworks produced in the country.

=== Indonesia ===
Indonesian art and culture has been shaped by long interactions between original indigenous customs and multiple foreign influences. Indonesia is central along ancient trading routes between the Far East and the Middle East, resulting in many cultural practices being strongly influenced by a multitude of religions, including Hinduism, Buddhism, Confucianism and Islam, all strong in the major trading cities. The result is a complex cultural mixture very different from the original indigenous cultures. Indonesian art may include, for example, prehistoric cave paintings and megalithic ancestral statues of Central Sulawesi, tribal wooden carving traditions of Toraja and Asmat people, Hindu-Buddhist art of classical Javanese civilization which produced Borobudur and Prambanan, vivid Balinese paintings and performing arts, Islamic arts of Aceh, to the contemporary art of Indonesian artists today.

Also of note are Balinese paintings, which often express natural scenes and themes from the traditional dances. Such Balinese art is art of Hindu-Javanese origin that grew from the work of artisans of the Majapahit Kingdom, with their expansion to Bali in the late 13th century. From the 16th until the 20th centuries, the village of Kamasan, Klungkung (East Bali), was the centre of classical Balinese art. During the first part of the 20th century, new varieties of Balinese art developed. Since the late twentieth century, Ubud and its neighboring villages established a reputation as the center of Balinese art. Eiseman observes that Balinese art is actually carved, painted, woven, and prepared into objects intended for everyday use rather than as object d 'art.

In the 1920s, with the arrival of many western artists, Bali became an artist enclave (as Tahiti was for Paul Gauguin) for avant-garde artists such as Walter Spies (German), Rudolf Bonnet (Dutch), Adrien-Jean Le Mayeur (Belgian), Arie Smit (Dutch) and Donald Friend (Australian) in more recent years. Most of these western artists had very little influence on the Balinese until the post-World War Two period, although some accounts over-emphasise the western presence at the expense of recognising Balinese creativity.

Textiles are another important part of Indonesian art. Batik involves wax-resist dyeing to create intricate patterns, while ikat uses resist-dyed threads for weaving.

=== Laos ===
Art in Laos has slowly been changed recently after the country has been exposed to other countries around the world, which influenced many other artists. The Laotians have many forms of art, which they always experiment with. The Ho Phakeo temple (built in the 16th century by King Setthatirath) is a popular museum that houses many famous artworks that have been created in the country.

Unfortunately, all films and music in Laos are required to be sent to government studios for official censorship (except for foreign films and music).

=== Malaysia ===
Traditional Malaysian art is mainly centred on the crafts of carving, weaving, and silversmithing. Traditional art ranges from handwoven baskets from rural areas to the silverwork of the Malay courts. Common artworks included ornamental kris and beetle nut sets. Luxurious textiles known as Songket are made, as well as traditional patterned batik fabrics. Indigenous East Malaysians are known for their wooden masks. Malaysian art has expanded only recently, as before the 1950s Islamic taboos about drawing people and animals were strong. Textiles such as the batik, songket, Pua Kumbu, and tekat are used for decorations, often embroidered with a painting or pattern. Traditional jewelry was made from gold and silver adorned with gems, and, in East Malaysia, leather and beads were used to the same effect.

=== Myanmar ===
Art of Myanmar refers to visual art created in Myanmar (Burma). Ancient Burmese art was influenced by India and was often religious in nature, ranging from Hindu sculptures in the Thaton Kingdom to Theravada Buddhist images in the Sri Ksetra Kingdom. The Bagan period saw significant developments in many art forms from wall paintings and sculptures to stucco and wood carving. After a dearth of surviving art between the 14th and 16th century, artists created paintings and sculptures that reflect the Burmese culture. Burmese artists have been subjected to government interference and censorship, hindering the development of art in Myanmar. Burmese art reflects the central Buddhist elements including the mudra, Jataka tales, the pagoda, and Bodhisattva.

=== Philippines ===
Art has developed and accumulated in the Philippines from the beginning of civilization in the country up to the present era. There are many branches of the art in the Philippines including folk architecture, weaving, literature, pottery, music, and many other art forms.

=== Singapore ===
The emergence of modern Singaporean art is often tied to the rise of art associations, art schools, and exhibitions in the 20th century, though the most well-known are the aesthetics of local and migrant Chinese artists whose art practices depicted Southeast Asian subject matter while drawing upon Western watercolor and oil painting, as well as Chinese ink traditions. The most famous are the migrant Chinese artists who painted in the Nanyang style in the 1950s, the name of the movement drawing from "Nanyang" (Chinese: 南洋; pinyin: nán yáng; lit. 'Southern Ocean'), a sinocentric Chinese term used to refer to Southeast Asia from the geographical perspective of China.

The history of Singaporean art may include, for instance, artistic traditions of the Malay Archipelago, portraiture, landscapes and natural history drawings of the colonial period, Chinese ink painting, Islamic calligraphy, Nanyang style paintings, social realist art, abstract art, and art practices using other traditional media such as sculpture, photography, and printmaking. It also includes contemporary art practices such as performance art, conceptual art, installation art, video art, sound art, and new media art. Singapore and Malaysia's long shared history as British Malaya results in many overlaps in the art histories of both countries, with the expulsion of Singapore from the Federation of Malaya taking place in 1965.

Contemporary art in Singapore made by the artists today tends to examine themes of "hyper-modernity and the built environment; alienation and changing social mores; post-colonial identities and multiculturalism." Across these tendencies, "the exploration of performance and the performative body" is a common running thread. Singapore carries a notable history of performance art, with the state having enacted a de facto ban on the art form for a decade from 1994 to 2003, following a controversial performance artwork at the 5th Passage art space in Singapore.

=== Thailand ===
Many of the art in Thailand is based on Buddhism. The first period of art occurred during the Sukhothai Kingdom, which began in the 13th century. The art during the period was mostly artworks drawn of Buddha.

Thailand is also known for its ceramics, particularly celadon pottery, known for its green glaze from the Sukhothai period (13th–14th centuries).

=== Vietnam ===
Art in Vietnam was first introduced as clay pots created during the Stone Age. It is estimated that Vietnamese art began when indigenous groups began creating pottery. Vietnam’s Bát Tràng village is famous for blue-and-white wares.

The art has been forged many times in the past. Some of the art at the Fine Arts Museum in Ho Chi Minh City had actually been forged. The forgery was revealed when Nguyen Thanh Chuong noticed a forgery of an artwork that he created, which set off an entire scandal relating to the museum.

== See also ==
- Southeast Asian sculpture
