= Ida Bagus Made Togog =

Indonesian artist (1913–1989)

Ida Bagus Made Togog (1913–1989) was born into a noble Brahmana clan in the center of Batuan. Together with I Ngendon, he was one of the foremost painters from Batuan. Unlike Ngendon, Togog was not particularly interested in Western ideas. He was comfortable with the Balinese way of life and adhered closely to the Balinese belief system. As a member of the high priest family, Togog was very familiar with Balinese lontar (religious literature) and Balinese myths and folklore. His works were primarily drawn from religion and local myths from an insider's view point and he narrates them through his drawings, just like in the Wayang tradition. The strength of his drawings was neither his draftsmanship nor composition, but his narration of complex religious beliefs and the united life in Bali as a balance between the macrocosm and microcosm, between the benevolent and good spirits. According to Wim Bakker, it was the Dutch painter Rudolf Bonnet, who inspired him to translate images in Balinese lontars into drawings. During 1936 to 1938, he was befriended by Gregory Bateson and Margaret Mead and produced 83 paintings for them. As Bateson and Mead went to Bali to do research on Balinese character, they requested Togog to give an expression of his dreams. He produced a large number of drawings on dreams and his own interpretation in the context of Balinese beliefs as he understood it.

His works can be found in Tropenmuseum in Amsterdam and in the Rudolf Bonnet collection at the Ethnography Museum in Leiden, the Netherlands. In Bali, his can be viewed at the Puri Lukisan Museum and the Agung Rai Museum of Art (ARMA) in Ubud, Bali.
