= Neka Art Museum =

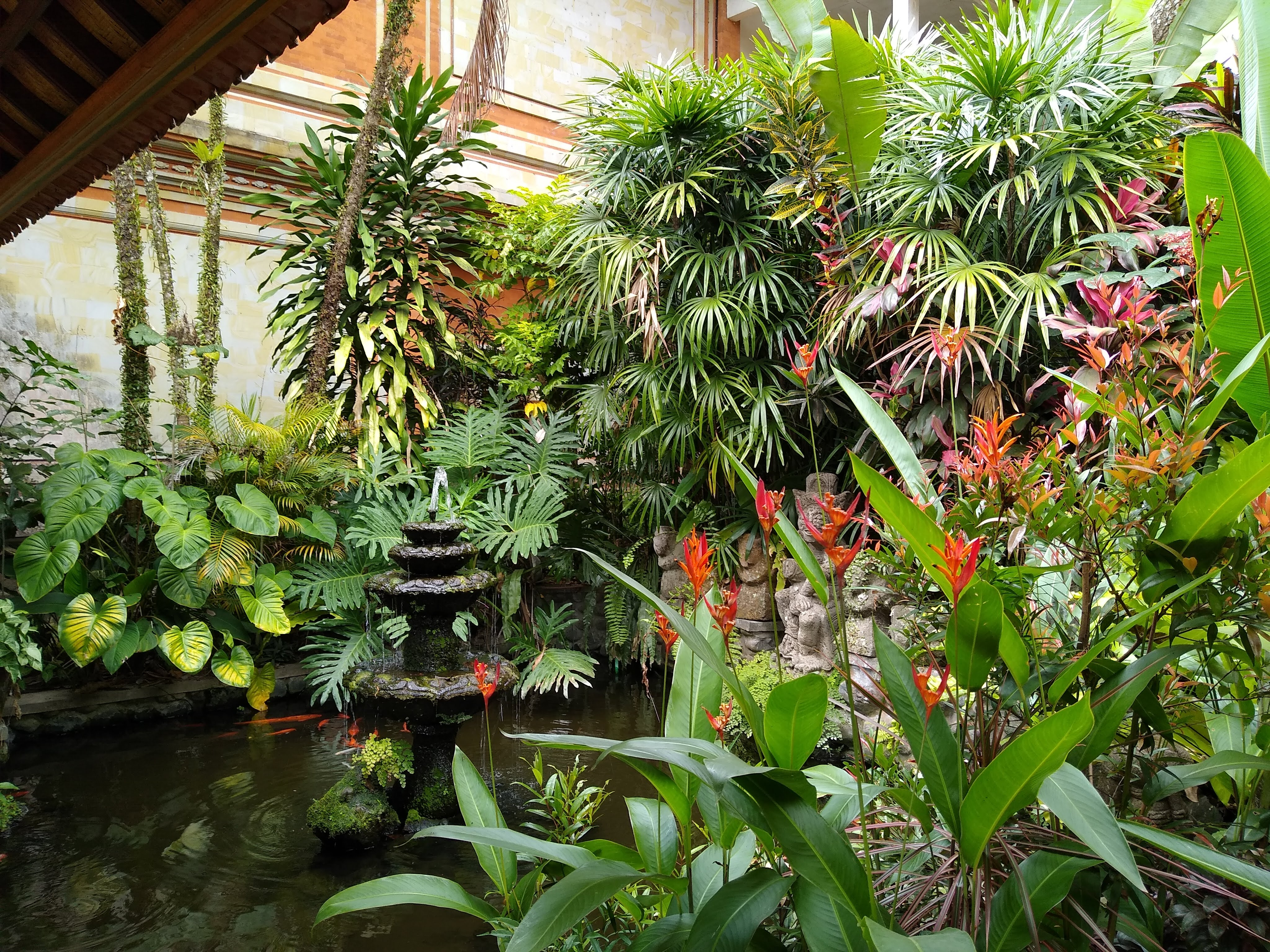
- Established: July 7, 1982
- Location: Jalan Raya Sanggingan Campuhan, Kedewatan, Kecamatan Ubud, Kabupaten Gianyar, Bali 80571
- Type: Art Museum
- Collections: Fine Arts relating to Balinese arts and culture from Balinese, Indonesian, and Western artists
- Director: PM Kardi Suteja
- Owners: JMK Suteja Neka (founder), PM Kardi Suteja (successor)
- Parking: On site

The Neka Art Museum (also known as NAM) is an art museum in Ubud, Bali, Indonesia, It was established in 1982 by Pande Wayan Suteja Neka, better known as JMK Suteja Neka, a Balinese art dealer who had begun collecting Balinese art with the advice and help of painters Rudolf Bonnet and Arie Smit among others.

Currently, NAM is being managed by JMK Suteja Neka's son, PM Kardi Suteja.

== History ==
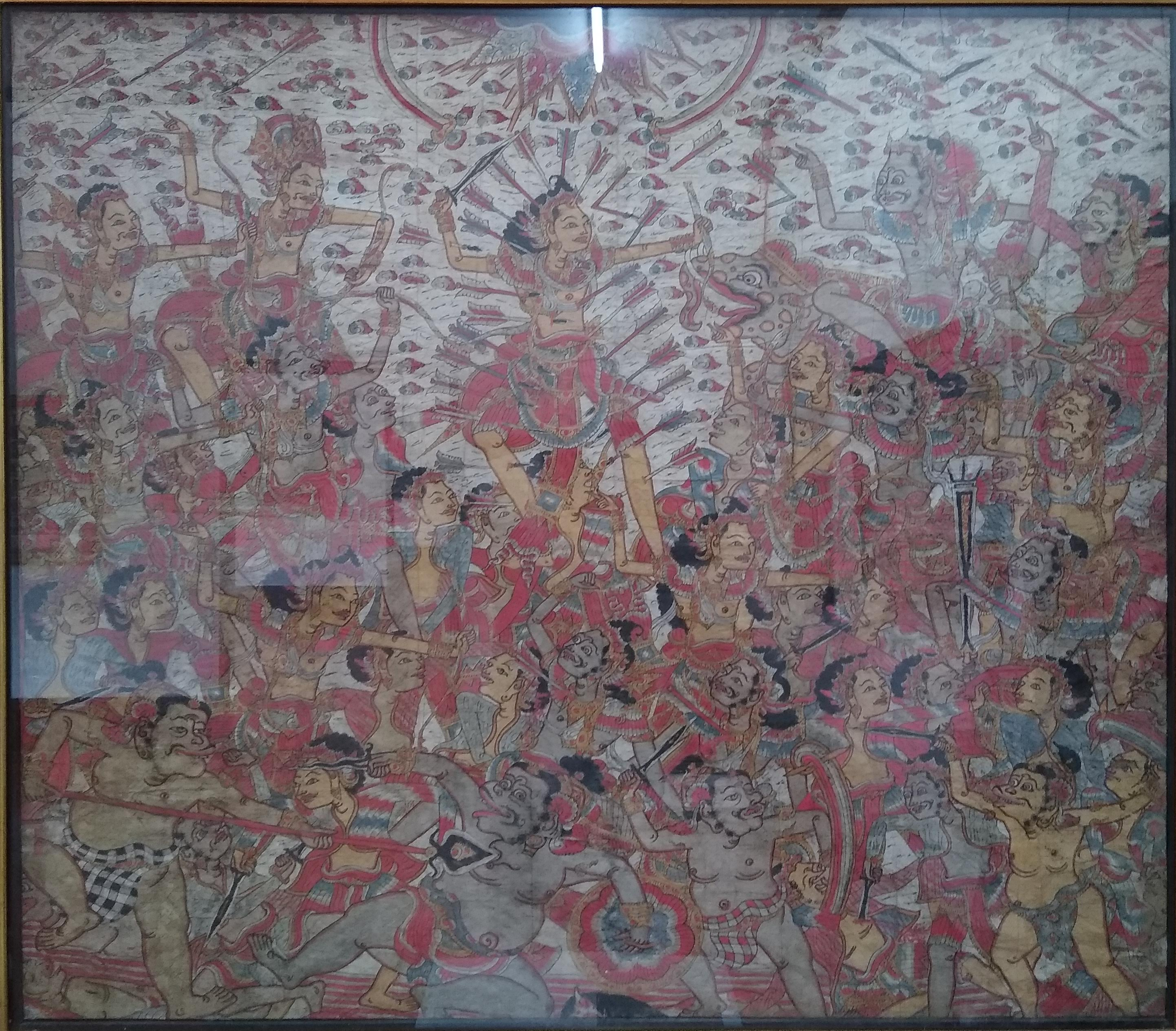
The Death of Abhimanyu, 19th century

Pande Wayan Suteja Neka, was the son of I Wayan Neka, a famous wood carver who was a member of the Pitamaha. Suteja Neka's father I Wayan Neka (1917 - 1980), was a renowned carver. He is best known for creating a three-metre tall statue of the garuda bird for the Indonesia Pavilion at the New York World Fair in the United States of America in 1964, and another one for Expo 70 held in Osaka, Japan.

Suteja Neka trained as an elementary school teacher but decided to give up teaching in order to help his father present his artwork. With the support of his wife Ni Gusti Made Srimin he opened one of Ubud's first art galleries in 1966. Soon it became a hub for artists, including Affandi, Dullah, Hendra Gunawan and Srihadi Soedarsono, many later becoming family friends. Many of the paintings he stocked were purchased by foreign tourists and taken out of Indonesia. He subsequently began collecting works to document and preserve Balinese art. In 1975, Neka travelled overseas with the Dutch artist Rudolf Bonnet where during visits to various museums he saw fine examples of Balinese art which couldn't be seen in Indonesia. Returning home he resolved to establish a fine arts museum in Bali.

Established in 1976 the museum was officially opened on 7 July 1982 by Dr Daoed Joesoef, the Indonesian Minister for Education and Culture. At the time of its establishment it was the first privately owned museum in Bali.

The museum is currently home to 400 paintings and sculptures.

== Design Concept ==
Arranged over a hectare the museum is designed to reflect the traditional architecture of a Balinese family compound, with visitors encouraged to walk through a series of galleries, starting with classical paintings and progressing to contemporary Indonesian art, followed by art created in and influenced by Bali by foreign artists.

After the Covid-19 pandemic in early 2020 until the end of 2021, PM Kardi Suteja and PA Laksmi Kardi with their families have renovated old buildings and added new buildings in addition to rearranging existing art collections so that they can be easily appreciated.

The Mecaru Ceremony and the Rehearsal of the NAM were held on Sukra Wage Krulut December 24, 2021.

The opening is like the rebirth of the NAM on April 22, 2022.

== Buildings ==
The main part of the complex is occupied by the Bale Sumanggen (a multipurpose building) which houses the ticket office, a gift shop, a bookstore, administration offices and a temporary exhibition hall. Scattered behind it in a Natah (open garden) is a series of pavilions and halls trace the development of painting in Bali.

The multi-room Balinese Painting Hall gives an overview of the three major schools of Balinese painting from the 17th century to the present day and includes Anak Agung Gde Sobrat’s Ubud-style painting The Bumblebee Dance and the Busy Bali by I Wayan Bendi (1950– ), which reflects on the effects of tourism on the island.

The Arie Smit Pavilion exhibits works in the Young Artists style as well as paintings by their mentor, Arie Smit. The Photography Archive Centre houses a collection of black-and-white photographs from Bali in the 1930s and 1940s.

The small Lempad Pavilion is dedicated to local artist I Gusti Nyoman Lempad.

The Contemporary Indonesian Art Hall focuses on contemporary works by artists from other parts of Indonesia.

The East-West Art Annex is home to contemporary Indonesian art with works by important artists such as Abas Alibasyah, Abdul Aziz (1928-2002), Javanese artist Affandi, Bagong Kussudiardja, Dullah, Sindudarsono Sudjojono, Srihadi Soedarsono (1931– ) and Haji Widayat (1919–2002). It is also home to works by overseas artists who have been inspired by the natural beauty, life, and culture of Bali. Among the artworks on display are portraits by Dutch artists Rudolf Bonnet (such as his Temptation of Arjuna) and Willem Gerard Hofker, works by Australian artist Donald Friend and Swiss artist Theo Meier (1908–1982) and Louise Garrett Koke (1897–1993. A section is devoted to Asian artists, such as Malaysian born Chang Fee-Ming, Singaporean born Teng Nee-Cheong, Filipino artist Jeremiah Elizalde Navarro and Japanese-American artis Paul Nagano.

Upper stairs and adjacent to the East West Annex is the Kris Hall, which is home to a superb collection of kris (also known as keris).

== Pavilions and Collections ==
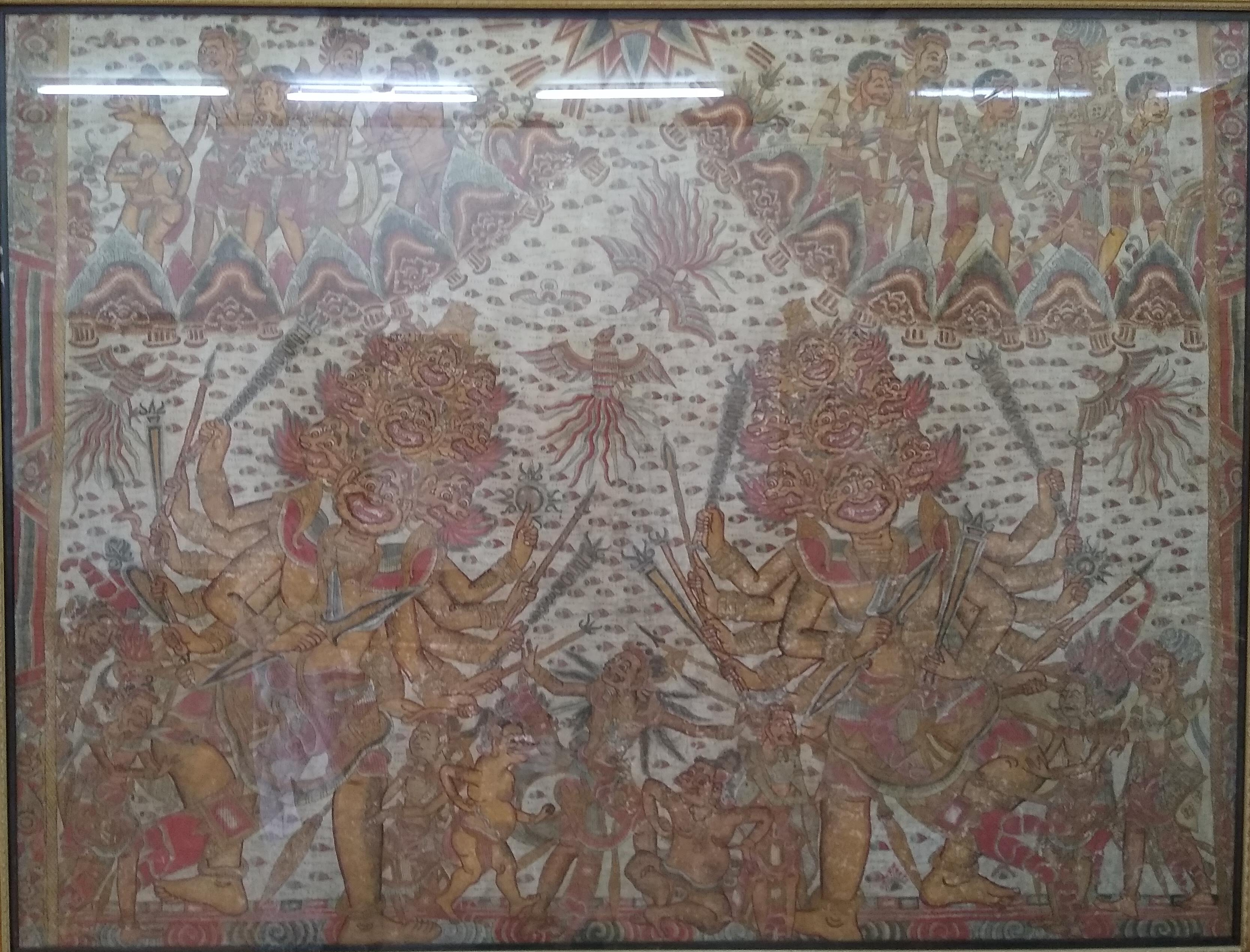
Demonic Transformation, 19th century

=== Balinese Painting Hall ===
Classical Puppet Style Painting : Originating from the 17th century or earlier, these artworks are usually anonymous but include work by Mangku Mura and I Nyoman Arcana.

Ubud Style Painting : Appearing after the 1920s, these works show the influence of European painters.

=== Arie Smit Pavilion ===
NAM has the biggest collections of Arie Smit with the earliest painting from the Maestro dated to 1940s when he was still deployed as a Dutch soldier in Cideng, Jakarta.

=== Affandi Pavilion ===
JMK Suteja Neka and Affandi shared a close friendship. NAM owned Affandi's painting related to Balinese arts and culture including, Galungan Holiday painting, Barong paintings, Kusamba Sailing painting, Banyan Tree painting, and Cockfighting paintings. There is also Affandi's famous portrait paintings greeting visitors as they enter the pavilion.

=== Lempad Pavilion ===
The Lempad Pavilion houses collections of the Balinese Maestro, I Gusti Nyoman Lempad, in NAM is curated by Walter Spies. The first Lempad's painting collected at NAM was Durma Meets the Mother of Angels, which was a painting gifted by the maestro himself.

=== Keris Pavilion ===
Kris : This collection came about when in the mid-2000s, Neka developed an interest in kris spurred by a realization of his swadharma (self-obligation) as a member of the Pande (blacksmith) clan and as a descendant of Pande Pan Nedeng, the royal blacksmith for the court of Ida I Dewa Agung Djelantik, the 19th century king of Peliatan. He spent most of the following decade traveling across Bali and to Java –considered Indonesia's kris heartland acquainting himself with notable mpu (kris-makers) and scholars as he built up his collection. The museum has approximately 27 heirloom kris that were gifted to the museum by the descendants of royal houses and venerated mpu (blacksmiths). As well it has another 100 historical and antiquate kris and another 200 kris of the post-independence period. Notable kris in the collection include:

- Ki Baju Rante. This straight blade heirloom kris is famed for its ability to pierce through baju rante (chain mail). It was crafted in the 18th century by Mpu Pande Rudaya, the royal blacksmith of the king of Karangasem. Uniquely, this kris possesses both kinds of pamor (decorative pattern) as one side of the blade shows a decorative nickel alloy pattern called iris pandan (“sliced pandanus leaves”), which is a decorative pattern known as pamor rekan as it is designed by the kris maker, while the other side shows ilining warih ("water flow"), which is a decorative pattern known as pamor tiban, which is formed naturally. It was said that this kris played an important role in the military annexation of neighbouring Lombok by Karangasem warriors.
- Ki Pijetan (“Venerable Pinched One”). It is believed that this straight blade Keris was forged in the 13th century by legenary blacksmith Geni Sandang Jiwa (whose name means “Fire Born in the Soul”). It is claimed that while making it he repeatedly pinched the red-hot blade with his bare fingers in order to create its rare makings which are known as Pulo Tirta (“Islands in Holy Water”) due to their reminiscence to a chain of coral atolls. These markings are said to bring prosperity, social ease and family peace to the owner. The blade's design is known as “starling bird mattress essence”, while unusually the hilt is an extension of the blade, with its handle modelled on a cylindrical betel nut which is in turn wrapped in a cord of human hair.

In 2009, Mahasemaya Warga Pande, the clan-based organization for the descendants of the island's blacksmiths, honoured Neka with the title Jejeneng Mpu Kris (venerated kris-maker).
