= I Nyoman Ngendon =

Indonesian painter (1906–1946)

I Nyoman Ngendon (1906-1946). I Nyoman Ngendon was among the first Batuan painters who embraced the modernization of Balinese art that took place around the beginning of the 1930s. Ngendon first learned the Wayang-style painting from I Dewa Nyoman Mura, a well-known painter in Batuan. Walter Spies' influence can be seen in their early works (prior to the 1940s). His works can be found in several museums throughout the world. In Bali, his works can be viewed at the Museum Puri Lukisan and the Agung Rai Museum of Art (ARMA). In the Netherlands, his works can be found at the Rijksmuseum voor Volkenkunde, Leiden and the Tropenmuseum, Amsterdam.
