= Mas, Bali =

Indonesian village

Coordinates: 8.543°S 115.272°E

Mas is a village about six kilometers south of Ubud, Bali, Indonesia, renowned internationally as a center for Balinese woodcarving. The village has been known for its carving tradition since at least the 1930s, and its artists have gained global recognition for their carved sculptures, dance masks, and ceremonial objects. Some of the works were also collected by Indonesian President Sukarno.

== History ==
The village's woodcarving tradition dates back generations, with their skills passed down through families. In the 1920s, German painter Walter Spies and Dutch artist Rudolf Bonnet settled in Bali and encouraged local artists, which helped to bring internation attention to Mas. As such, by the 1930s, Mas was widely known as a center for carving. In the 1960s, tourism growth and demand from collectors further boosted the reputation of the village. An article from The New York Times datelined Mas, Bali reported on the village's carving boom, and the works by Ida Bagus Njana were collected by President Sukarno.

== Galleries ==
The Nyana & Tilem Gallery was established by the family of Ida Bagus Njana and Ida Bagus Tilem, which showed the generations of woodcarving. The I.B. Sutarja - Mask Carver Gallery continued the work of Ida Bagus Sutarja, run by his wife and children. Both galleries are destinations for collectors and tourists interested in Balinese carving.
