= Puri Lukisan Museum =

Museum in Bali, Indonesia

Coordinates: 8°30′18.35″S 115°15′37″E

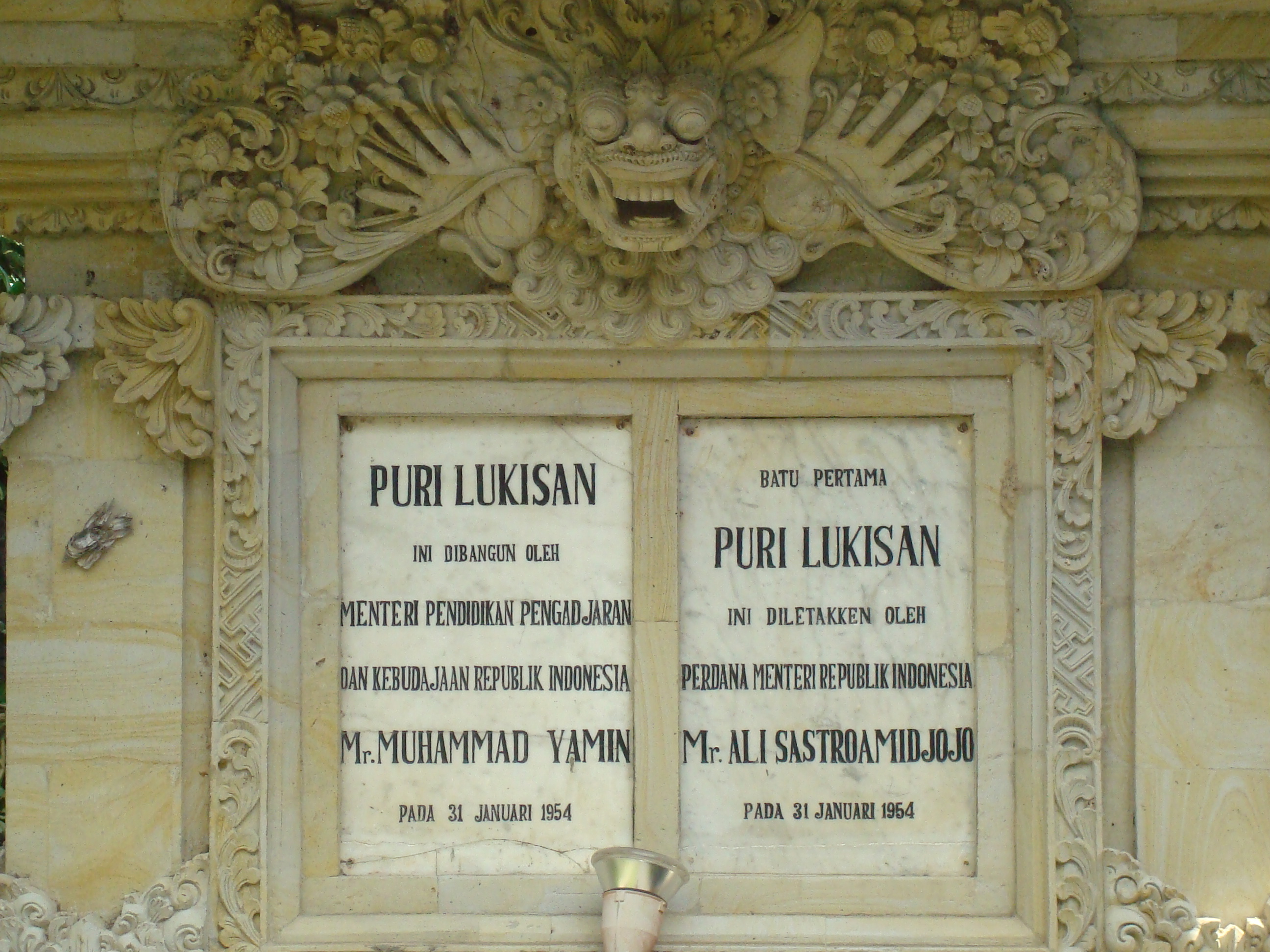
Entrance of Puri Lukisan Museum

The Puri Lukisan Ratna Wartha Museum (Indonesian: Museum Puri Lukisan Ratna Warna; Balinese script: ᬫᬸᬲᬾᬬᬸᬫ᭄ᬧᬸᬭᬶᬮᬸᬓᬶᬲᬦ᭄ᬭᬢ᭄ᬦᬯᬃᬡ) is an art museum in Ubud, Bali, Indonesia, specializing in traditional and modern Balinese painting and wood carving. The museum is located in Ubud, Bali, Indonesia. Its collection includes Balinese paintings and wood carving from the 1930s onwards. Works in the collection represent the Sanur, Batuan, Ubud, Young Artist and Keliki schools.

== History ==
Mr. Jero Wacik, Minister of Culture and Tourism of Indonesia at the 50th Anniversary of Museum Puri Lukisan on July 14, 2008. Shown are the photographs of the two founders of the Museum: the Dutch artist Rudolf Bonnet (left) and the King of Ubud - Tjokorda Gde Agung Sukawati (right).

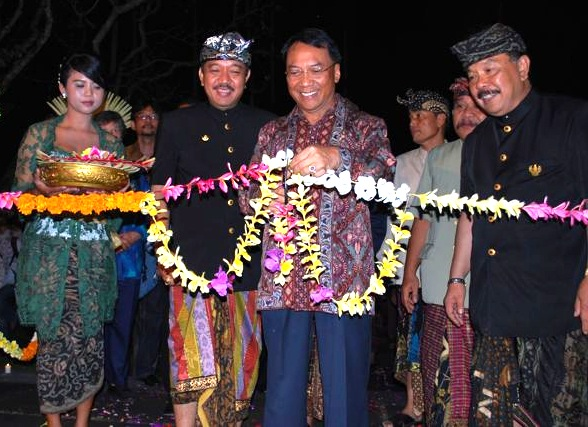

Year	Historical Events
1936	The Pitamaha Artist Cooperative was founded by Tjokorda Gde Agung Sukawati (the King of Ubud) and Tjokorda Gde Raka Sukawati (the King's brother) along with two western artists working in Bali at the time: Walter Spies and Rudolf Bonnet. Its mission was to preserve and develop traditional Balinese art.
1953	The Ratna Wartha Foundation was founded to carry on the Pitamaha ideals and mission. The concept of building the Museum Puri Lukisan was born.
1954	Indonesian Prime Minister, Mr. Ali Sastroamidjojo, laid the first stone beginning the construction of the Museum on January 31, 1954
1956	Indonesian Minister of Education and Cultural Affairs, Mr. Mohammad Yamin officiated at the opening of the Museum.
1972	Two new wings were added to the Museum, including a temporary exhibition hall
1978	Tjokorda Gde Agung Sukawati, I Gusti Nyoman Lempad and Rudolf Bonnet died. A magnificent royal cremation ceremony was held to honor them.
2008	Celebration of the 50th Anniversary of the Museum with two major exhibitions: the Pioneers of Balinese Painting from the Rudolf Bonnet collection (Leiden University Museum) and the world premier of the Ida Bagus Made Estate collection.
2011	A new wing (South Gallery), an open meeting hall and the museum cafe were added.

== Museum Buildings ==
- Building I (North) – the Pitamaha Gallery houses the Pre-War modern traditional Balinese paintings (1930–1945) and I Gusti Nyoman Lempad collection
- Building II (West) – the Ida Bagus Made Gallery houses the Ida Bagus Made Estate Collection
- Building III (East) – the Wayang Gallery houses Wayang Painting Collection.
- Building IV (South) – the Founders Gallery covers the museum's history and is used for temporary exhibitions and displays of new acquisitions.

== Highlights of the Collection ==
Ida Bagus Nyana (1912–1985)

Ida Bagus Nyana was a talented wood sculptor and dancer. He is known for his impressionistic, elongated woodcarvings whose fluid shapes, devoid of excessive detail, often appear as if they had been pulled from taffy. His sculpture of the Goddess Pertiwi (Mother Earth), with its spidery legs and coiled serpent, is dreamlike and surrealistic. Nyana's son, Ida Bagus Tilem, was also a talented woodcarver. Both father and son were known for their ability to seemingly giving life to inanimate wood, transforming it into magnificent forms with a sense of movement and use of all the dimensions.

Ida Bagus Gelgel (1900–1937)

Ida Bagus Gelgel grew up in Kamasan, far away from direct western influence, but his works evolved beyond the conventions of the Wayang tradition. In 1937, one of his paintings won a silver medal at the International Colonial Art Exhibition in Paris. One of his works, The Priest Dharmaswami, was painted in 1935 using natural dyes on paper. It depicts the story of a priest who rescued a monkey, a snake and a tiger from a well. When the priest was later arrested by a prince on false charges, the animals came to his aid. The painting shows them bringing gifts in gratitude for having been rescued.

I Gusti Nyoman Lempad (~1862–1978)

Lempad was a Balinese artist whose work included painting, sculpture and architecture. He was particularly known for drawings of classical scenes. He maintained friendships with foreign artists living in Bali, including Rudolf Bonnet and Walter Spies. Lempad also designed palaces and temples in and around Ubud, including parts of the Puri Lukisan Museum, and painted murals at the entrance to the museum's North Building. Lempad's drawing, the Dream of Dharmawangsa, is one of the masterpieces of the museum and is rendered in his unique linear style.

Anak Agung Gde Sobrat (1919–1992)

Sobrat was the son of an aristocratic family. As a child, he delighted in the spectacles of the Balinese Wayang Kulit (shadow puppet performances). His grandfather, a well-known Wayang puppeteer, taught him to carve the rawhide puppets and familiarized him with the Hindu epics: the Ramayana and Mahabharata. His artistic talent drew the attention of other artists. Under the tutelage of Walter Spies, he learned to paint Balinese landscapes with surreal perspectives, and later from Bonnet he developed the techniques for portraiture. From 1957 to 1959, Sobrat taught at the highly regarded Academy of Fine Arts in Yogyakarta, where he developed his academic style. His painting of the Balinese Market was exhibited at the opening of the Museum Puri Lukisan and remains one of its masterpieces. Although the colors have faded, the composition of human figures shows the influence of Bonnet.

I Gusti Made Deblog (1910–1978)

This artist started his career as an apprentice in the studio of the Chinese photographer, Yap Sin Tin. Deblog's work portrays the beauty of nature, rendered in refined detail that reveals the presence of a deeper reality underlying the world. His artwork the Birth of Hanuman (1936) was presented to the Puri Lukisan Museum by the chairman of the Ford Foundation, and depicts a lush forest with magical nymphs and other forest dwellers bringing offerings to the newborn Hanuman.

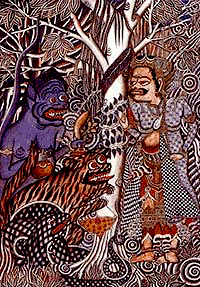
Ida Bagus Gelgel

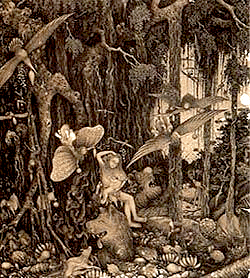
I Gusti Made Deblog

== Noted exhibitions ==
Pre-War Balinese Modernist (1999)

Featuring the pre-War Balinese paintings from the Leo Haks collection. Over 100 paintings and drawings were personally selected by Leo Haks to showcase the pre-War works of artists from Ubud, Sanur and Batuan. Many of the pieces came from the paintings collected by Gregory Bateson and Margaret Mead during their field study in Bali from 1935 to 1937.

Pioneers of Balinese Painting (July 14 - September 12, 2008)

Featuring masterpieces of Balinese art on loan from the Leiden University Museum, collected between 1929 and 1958 by Dutch artist Rudolf Bonnet, this exhibition showcases the specific characteristics, and style of Balinese artists from four geographic regions: Tampaksiring, Ubud, Batuan and Sanur. The Leiden University collection was supplemented by similar works from the permanent collection of the Puri Lukisan Museum, which were also selected by Rudolf Bonnet. This exhibition is accompanied by a catalogue entitled “Pioneers of Balinese Painting” by Helena Spannjard.

Ida Bagus Made (July 14 - December 31, 2008)

In 2000, following the artist's last wish, the widow of Ida Bagus Made loaned about 100 paintings from the artist's private collection to the Puri Lukisan Museum. Fifty of those paintings were presented to the public for the first time. This exhibition is accompanied by a catalogue: “Ida Bagus Made – the Art of Devotion” co-authored by Kaja McGowan et al.

Illuminating Line - Masterworks of I Gusti Nyoman Lempad (September 22 - December 18, 2014)

Featuring masterworks of I Gusti Nyoman Lempad (~1862 - 1978) from major public and private collections around the world: American Museum of Natural History (New York), Library of Congress (Washington DC), Lois Bateson Collection; Tropen Museum (Amsterdam), Royal Ethnographic Museum (Leiden), Welt Museum Wien (Vienna), and Dance Museum (Stockholm). This exhibition is accompanied by a catalogue: “Lempad of Bali – the Illuminating Line” co-authored by Bruce Carpenter, John Darling, Heidi Hinzler, Kaja McGowan, Adrian Vickers and Soemantri Widagdo.

== See also ==
- Ubud

== Literature ==
- Lenzi, Iola (2004). Museums of Southeast Asia. Singapore: Archipelago Press. p. 200. ISBN 981-4068-96-9.
