= I Ketut Soki =

Indonesian painter

I Ketut Soki (1946-2022) was a successful artist from Bali. As a boy, he was one of the first two children to receive art lessons from the famous artist Arie Smit, and so one of the founders of the "Young Artists" movement.

In 1960, Arie Smit went for a walk through the rice fields in Penestanan, Bali, and found a young boy drawing pictures in the sand. Smit invited the boy to his studio and gave him crayons and paper. The name of the young boy was I Nyoman Cakra. As a true Balinese, Nyoman didn't want to be alone, so he asked, "Can my nephew come too?" His nephew was I Ketut Soki and these two youths became Smit's first pupils.
