= Iseh =

Village in Bali, Indonesia

Coordinates: 8.453°S 115.463°E

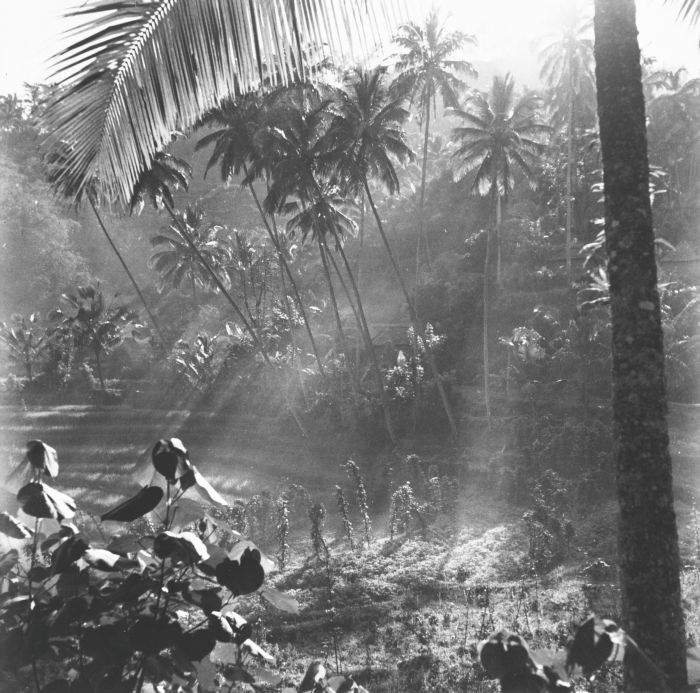
Landscape (1952)

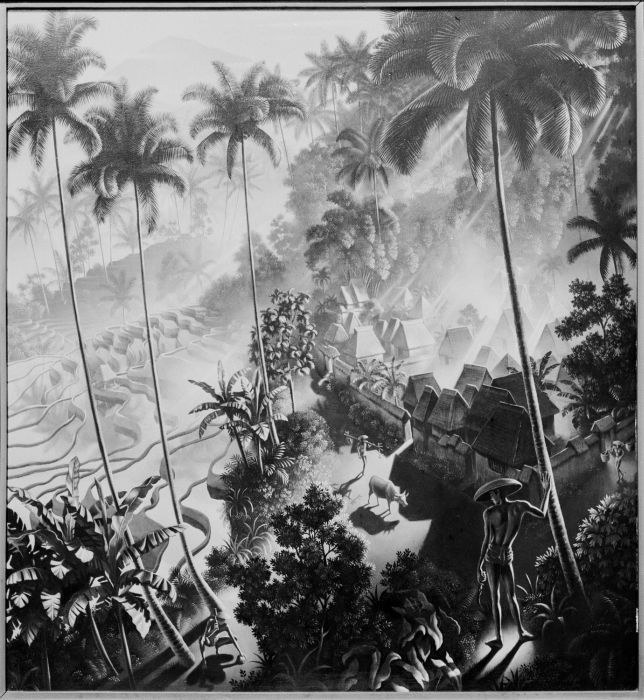
Isen at dawn by Walter Spies

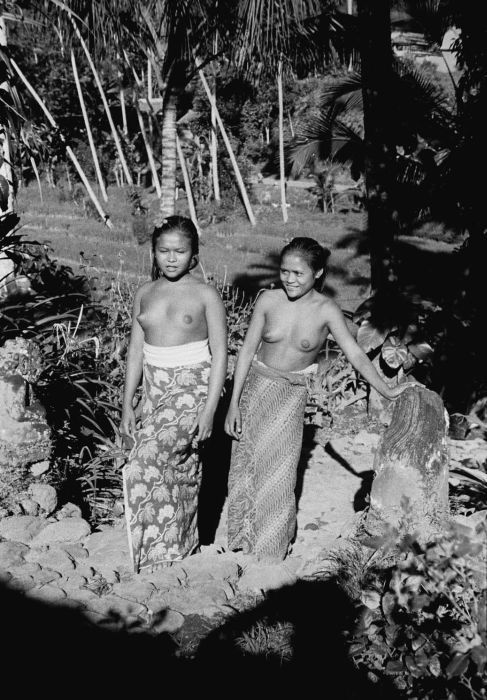
Models for Swiss painter Theo Meier

Iseh is a village in the Sideman district, Karangasem Regency, Bali, Indonesia. Walter Spies, Theo Meier and Theo Carp lived and worked in the area. The village is near mount Agung. The house Spies built amongst the volcanic landscape and terraced rice paddy fields remains.
