= Penestanan =

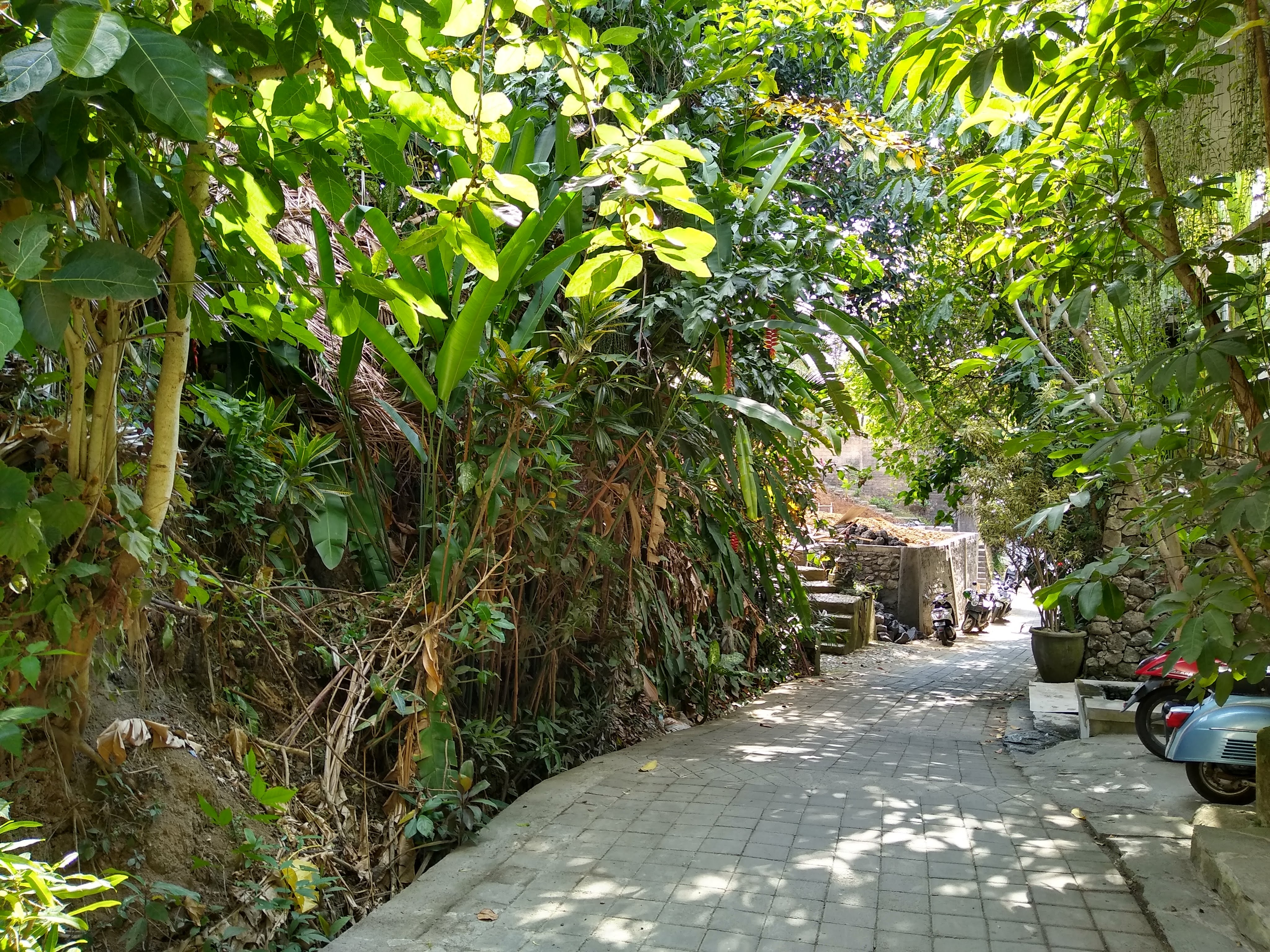

- Location in Bali
- Coordinates: 8°30′S 115°15′E
- Country: Indonesia
- Province: Bali

Penestanan is a village just outside the town of Ubud, in Bali, Indonesia. It has been known as an artist's village since the 1930s when Walter Spies lived there. Another notable resident is Arie Smit.

== Gallery ==
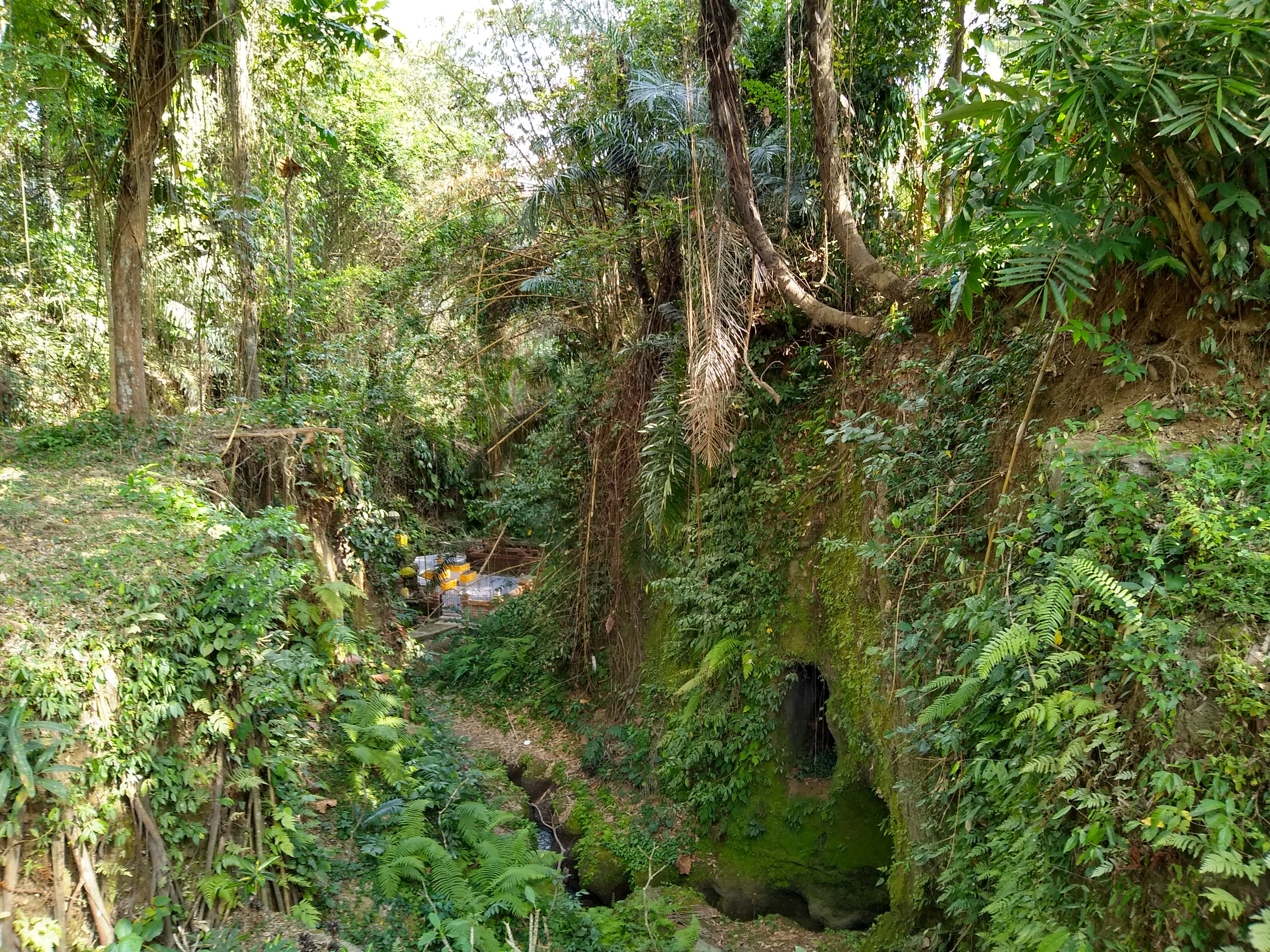
Foliage over a stream in the village

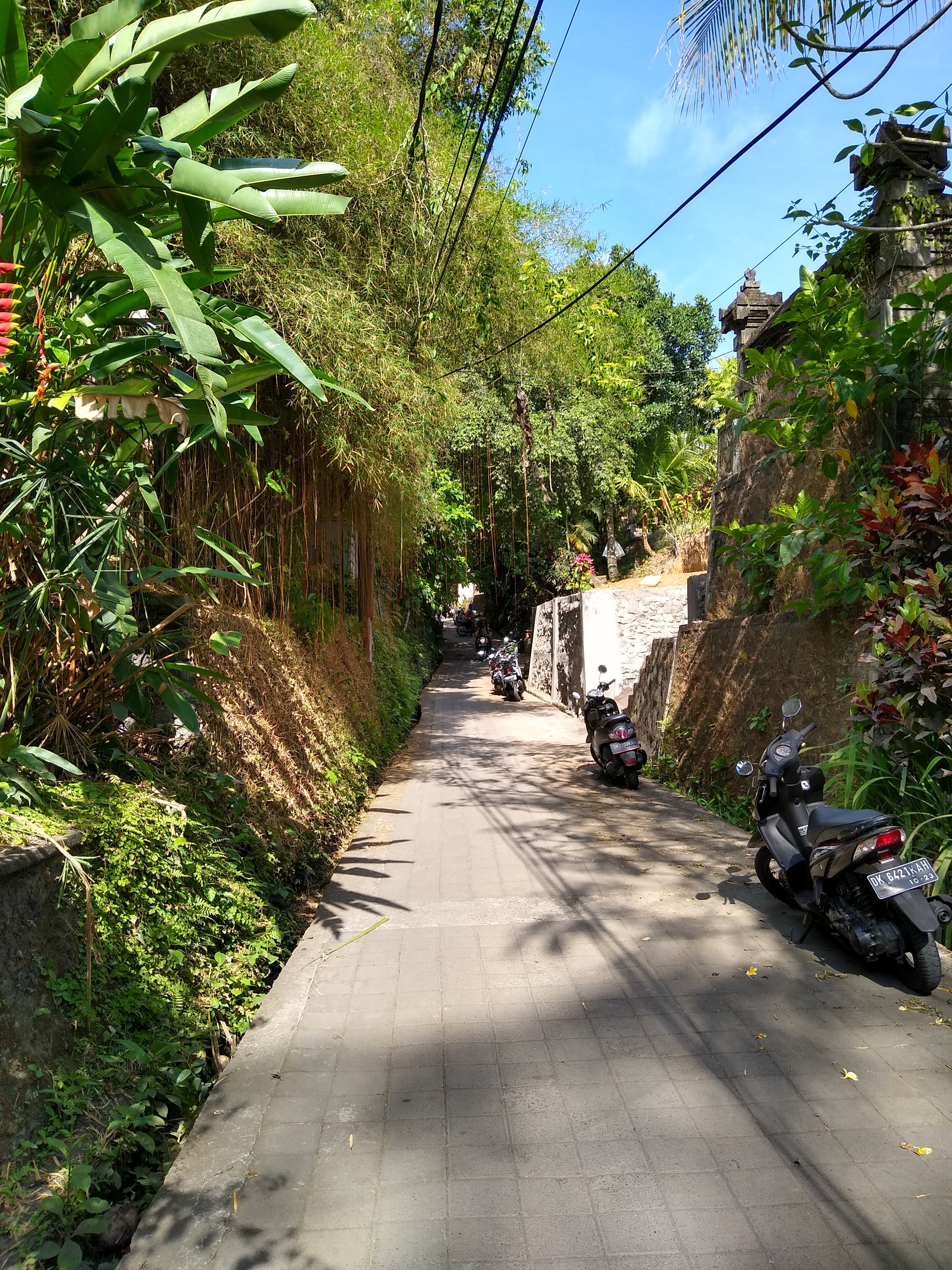
A street in the village

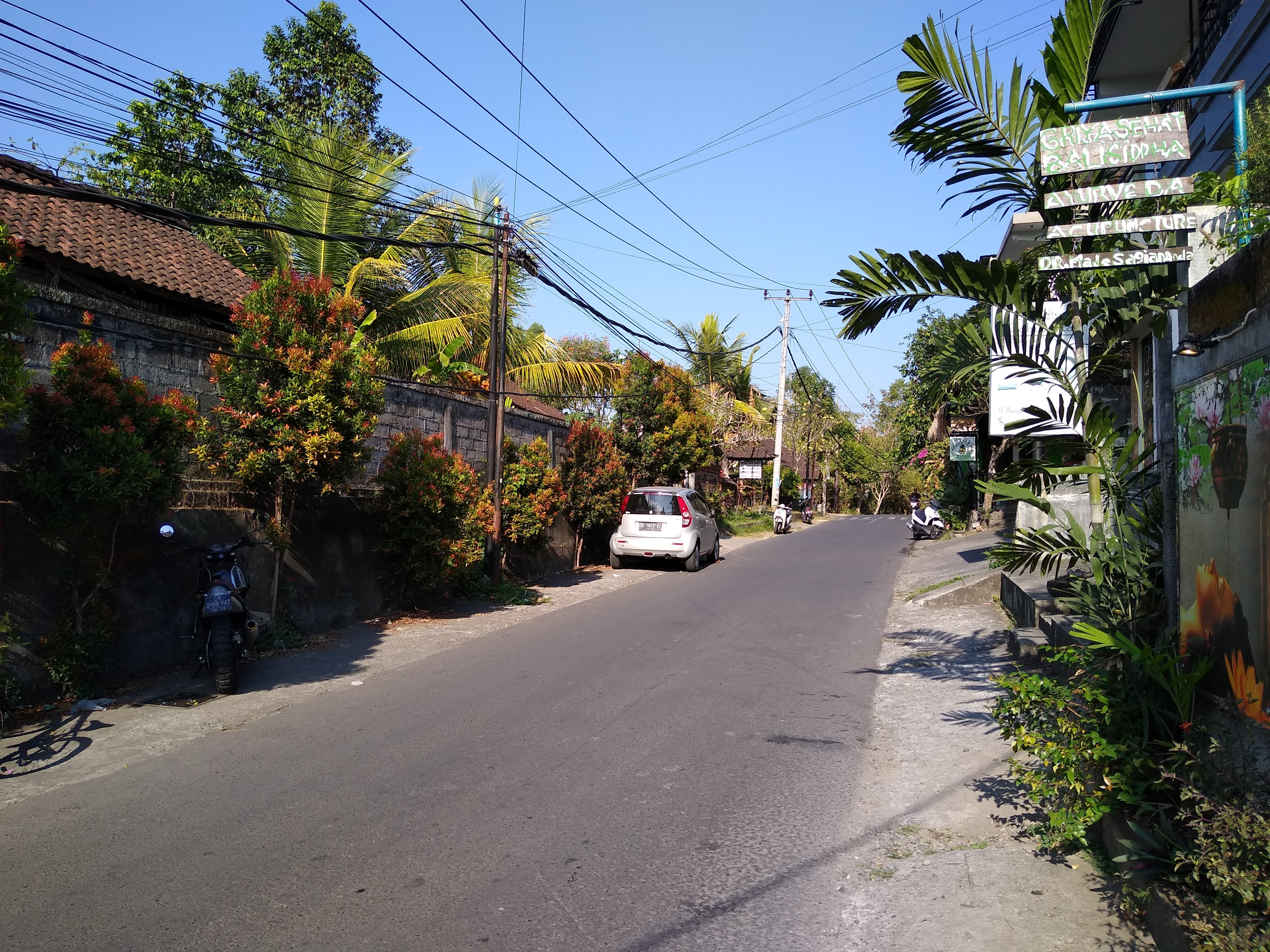
A street in the village

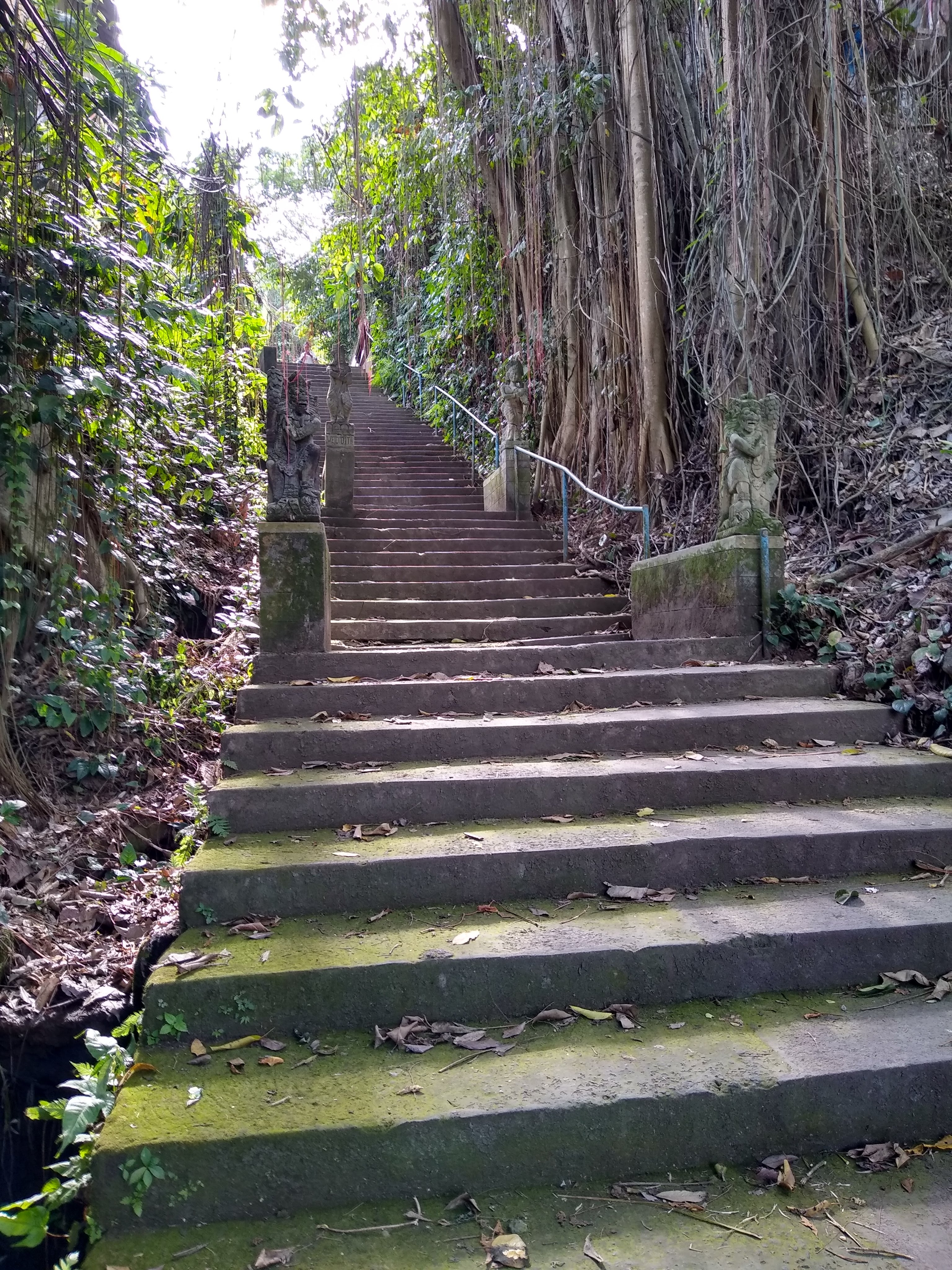
The steps connecting Penestanan to central Ubud

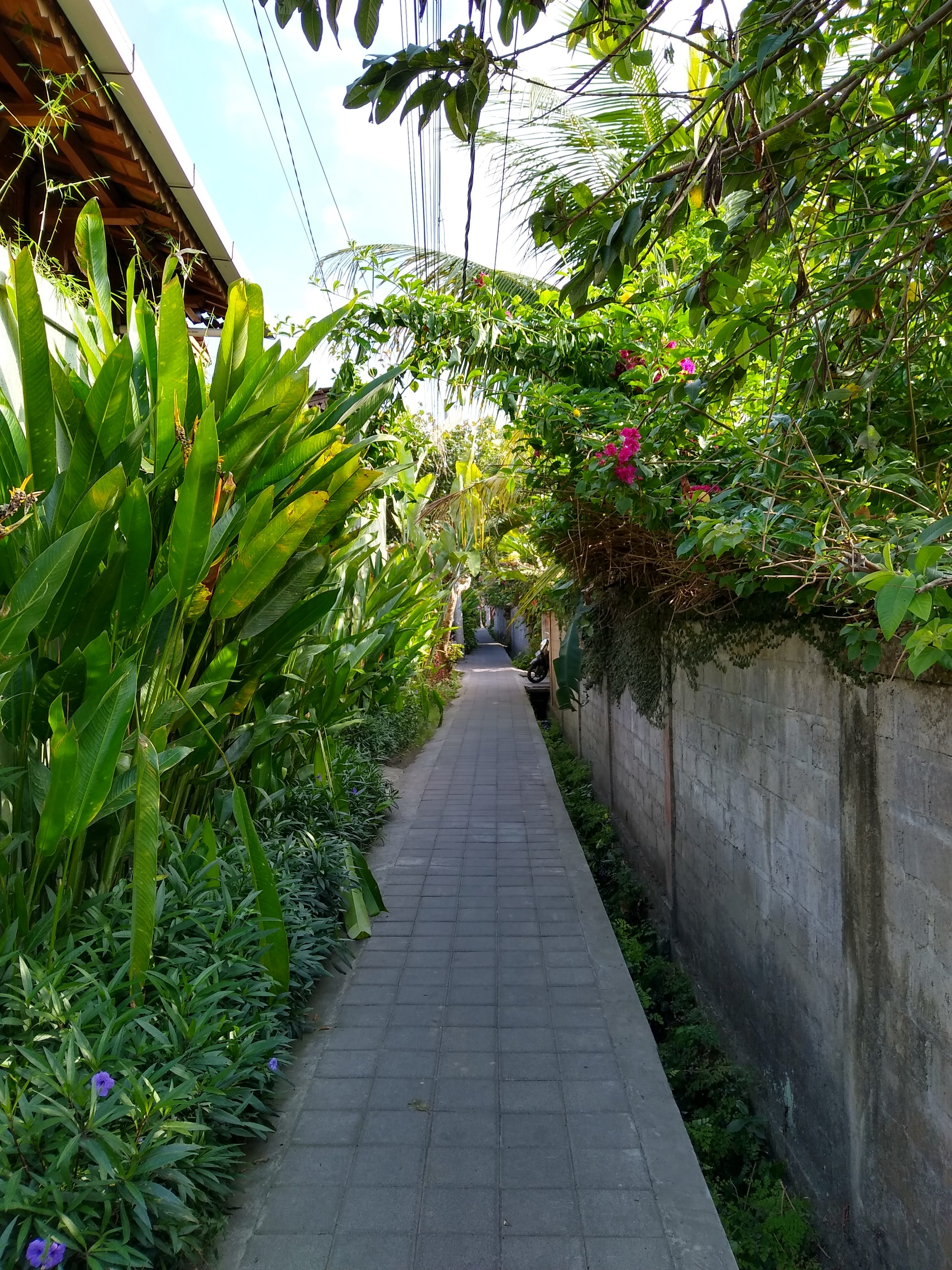
A walking path

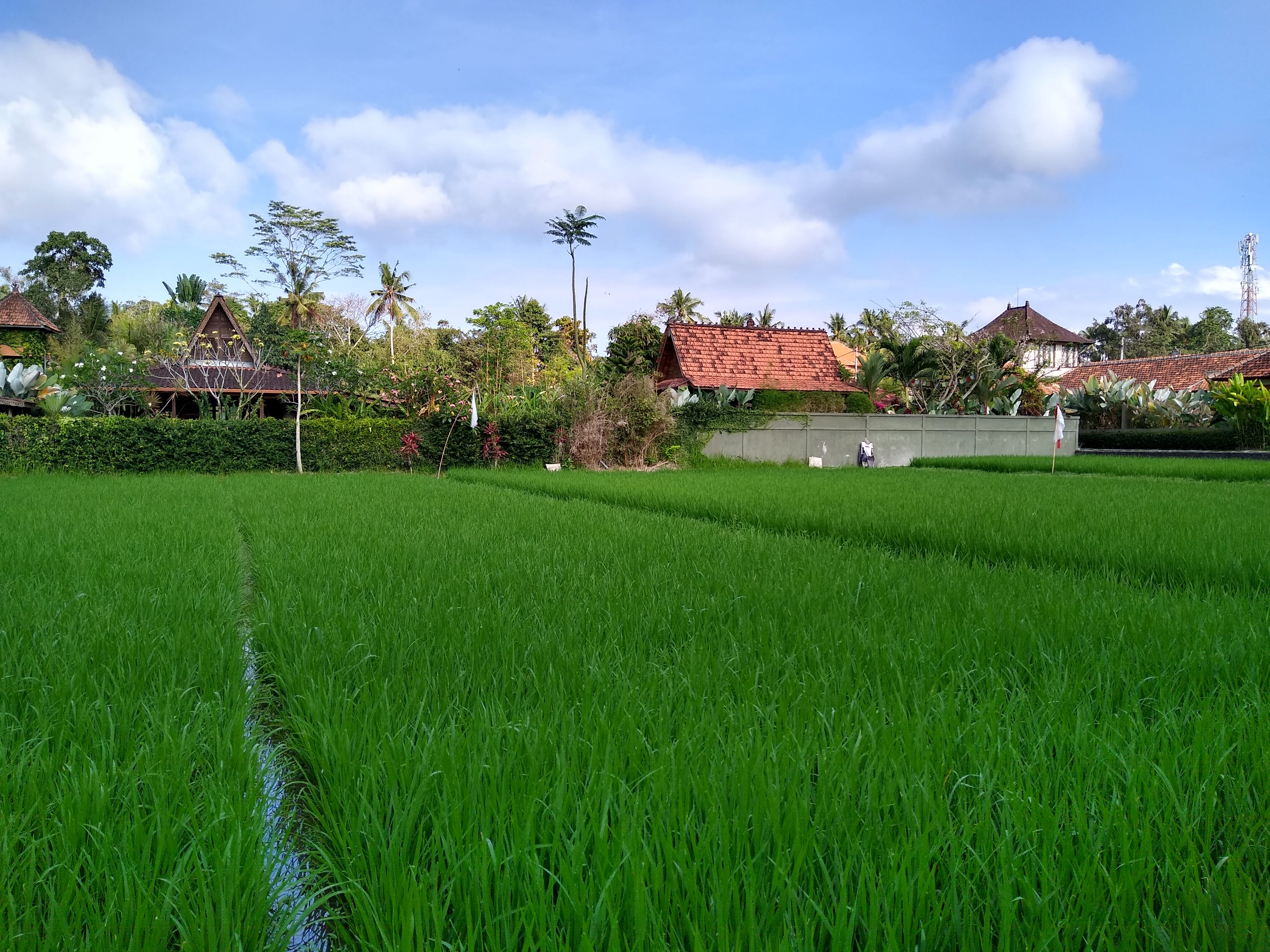
Farmland
