= Batuan, Bali =

Village in Bali, Indonesia

Batuan
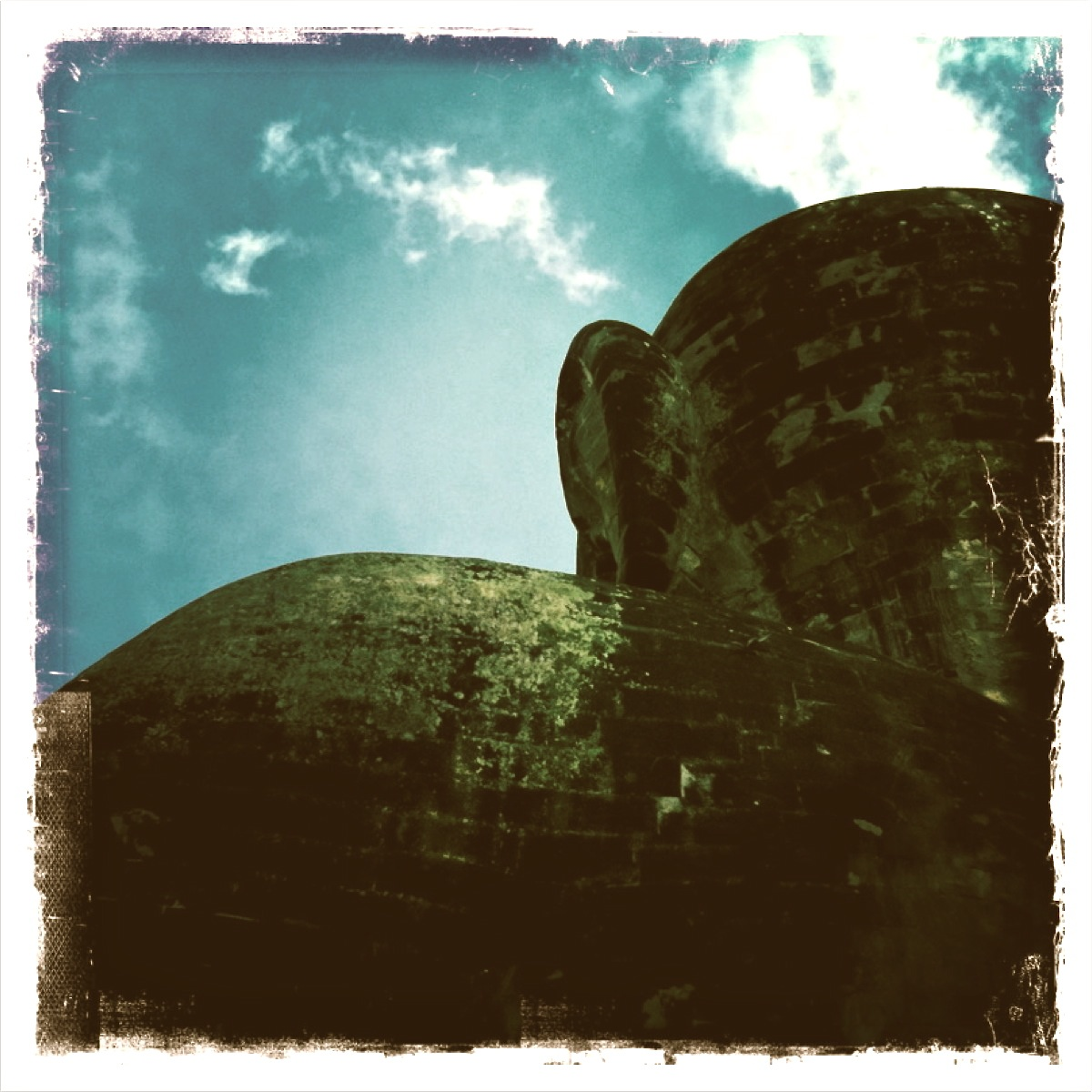
- The "Fat statue" of Batuan

- Location in Bali
- Coordinates: 8°35′8″S 115°16′32″E
- Country: Indonesia
- Province: Bali
- Postal code: 80582

Batuan (alternate: Batoeon or "Baturan") is a village in Bali, Indonesia. It is noted for its artwork and style of painting which originated in the village in the 1930s and has since emerged into a major Balinese artistic style, known as a Batuan painting. It is a major painting center and contains a number of art galleries and cooperative art societies which have played a key role in promoting the art of Batuan. The village is also known for its performance of the ancient Gambuh dance, performed every Full Moon day.

There are two temples on the western part of the village which are known as Pura Puseh and Pura Dasar. These temples are built in classical Balinese temple architecture style with elaborate carvings. Visitors are given vermilion sarongs to wear during visit to the temples. The town is also popular for carved teak wood furnishings. The village also has a "fat Buddha statue" (called the "Fat Baby Statue") at the cross road from Sakah to Blahbatuh facing east.

== Geography ==
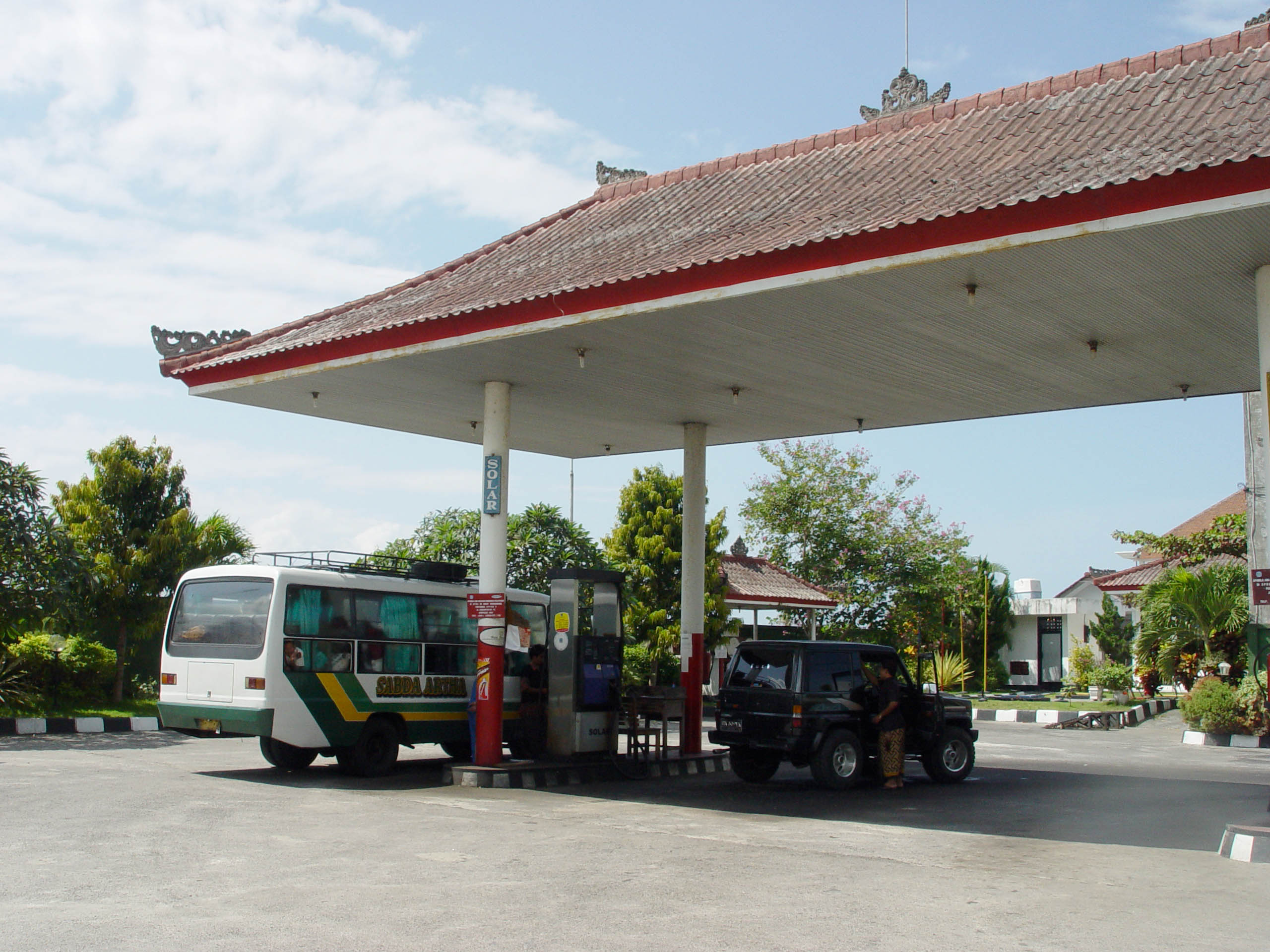
Gas station in Batuan

Batuan is located in central Bali about 10 kilometres (6.2 mi) south of Ubud and about 15 kilometres (9.3 mi) northeast of Denpasar contiguous to northern Sukhawathi village, another well-known art center. The land in this part of Bali is very flat. The area covered by the town excluding agricultural lands is 6 square kilometres (2.3 sq mi). The town is bounded by streams flowing through chasms or gorges, which provide water supply to the town. Apart from the streams that flow through the town, there are also irrigation canals sourced from upstream dams which provide irrigation facilities to large tract of paddy fields that surround the village, which was the back bone of the sustenance economy in the past; economy is now largely dependent on tourist influx and the town is now part of "World Economy." By 1995, the village had paved roads.

The town has a number of temples hidden in the labyrinth lanes and by lanes of the town but two temples are prominent on the main road. In addition, there are now concrete paved performance pavilions in the town with high roofs where dance performances are held by many dance groups, which have got established now to cater to the tourism in the town; one such pavilion is in front of the Pura Desa Batuan temple.

== History ==
Batuan is mentioned in historical records as far back as 1000 years. The Hindu and Indian influence in the region in the village is evident from the carvings and temples. In the 17th century, Batuan and southern Bali were controlled by the royal family until a priest's curse led to their losing their control; eventually they dispersed to various parts of the country. During the period of 1947–1949, most of the Batuan people remained loyal to the Gianyar Regency and opposed nationalism.

== Culture ==
=== Art ===
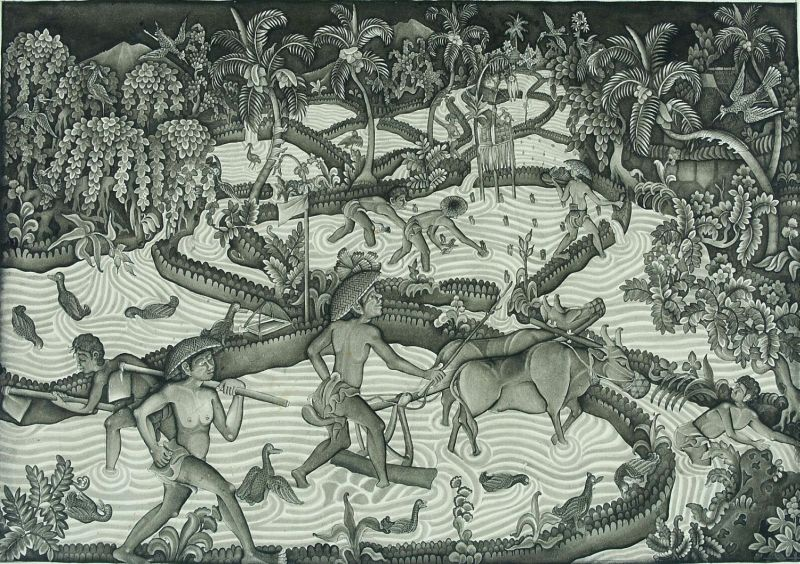
A typical painting from Batuan by a local artist

Balinese art forms are primarily classified under three major categories of which Batuan Style (distinct from the Ubud Style) which originated in Batuan is one style which has absorbed the traditional art form to the present dynamic art styles; the other two Bali art styles are the Ubud style of Ubed and the Sanur style which have been further supplemented by a "Young Artists" style of 1960s of Penestanan (the artists village) origin influenced by the Dutch artists. In the Batuan style of painting, the emphasis is adoption of sombre colour, generally in black and white with preponderance of mystic Balinese religious ethos related to sorcery and witchcraft. They are also famous for the miniature painting with great attention paid to detailing. The artists have an eye for detail as they paint with great patience. Vegetation is drawn in a stylised format, but each leaf is painted and shaded. The patterns, even in batik sarongs, have the minor figures drawn very carefully. Even the open space is filled with pulsating marks. Scenes emerge from the canvas and retreat into the vegetation such as a dog fight, a love affair, a group of gamblers, all shown in a corner of the canvas.

Batuan village gave its name to a style of painting which evolved in the 1930s after a group of local villagers, Ida Bagus Made Togog and Ida Bagus Made Wija began experimenting with ink-washed paintings on black backgrounds. These are popular to this day. The black and white background was said to evoke the supernatural. Artists in Batuan later changed to gouache and acrylics. In the early years of the Batuan genre art, Batuan artists explored subjects that concerned themselves rather than creating tourist art. While anthropologists Margaret Mead and Gregory Bateson had a special relationship with Batuan artists, they avoided influencing them and were careful in what Western pictures they were to show to the Batuans. Batuan artists depicted only a traditional world in their pictures, avoiding objects such as automobiles, until at least the late 1980s. Anthropologists also interpret that the paintings made by artists of Batuan are visual texts which represent the "Balinese Character".

Another notable feature is, unlike the Ubud style, the Batuan style also imbued daily life scenes in its depictions, deviating from the traditional. The depiction is of factual scenes but camouflaged in the form of masks. The colours used by the famous artists of Batuan were more bold than those used in Ubud paintings, with green and maroon being the dominant shades used for depicting human beings. Daily life with a complex variety of activities is depicted in great details. However, the painting canvases still adopted the three space formula with the bottom part devoted to daily human activities, with ritual activities in the middle section and with the upper section devoted to the realms of gods.

A Batuan painting by Ida Bagus Rai

The Batuan painters belonging to the Pita Maha Painters group also created aesthetically elegant paintings combining Buddhist mythology with vivacious and inventive Wayan-style images. These paintings have also been described as "naïve style works – almost caricatures – that depict daily life with humour."

The village is now dominated by galleries of various artists. Of major note is I Wayan Bendi Gallery, which is named after a notable contemporary artist in the style and sells expensive paintings, mostly over $200. Many paintings of the artist I Made Buli are located here. I Wayan Bendi of Batuan created the paintings as "craft for tourist painting" with himself as the central figure surrounded by tourists in various modes of life and this format has now become a flourishing art form.

=== Dance form ===
One of the popular and ancient dance forms, which is performed in Batuan and many other villages, frequently, is known as the Gambuh. It is a theatrical dancing art form which reportedly evolved in the 15th century which is a fusion of singing, drama and visual art forms. It is performed during the festivals of Full Moon day and also on occasions of marriages and other ceremonies, locally known as the Odalan, Manusa Yadnya and Pitra Yadnya (Ngaben). However, this dance form is stated to be on the decline.

Ethnography studies indicate that tourism has become integral to the economy of Batuan, particularly since the 1930s. So much so, that in the 1970s a frog dance was devised for the tourists which became a part of Balanese social life, as such dances were performed as part of wedding receptions.

=== Rituals ===
While certain villages in Bali are known for violence during trance state, violence rituals are not performed in Batuan, nor do Batuans commonly engage in the trance state at all.

== Festivals ==
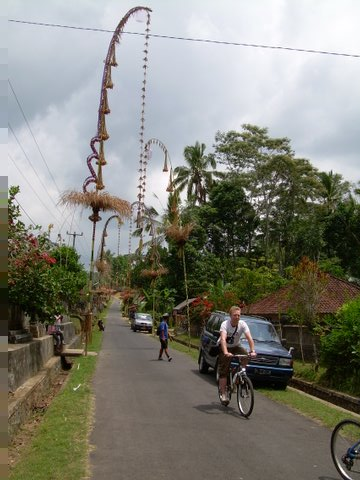
Penjor made of bamboo is displayed in villages during Galungan

The most popular festival that is observed in Batuan and other places in Bali is the Galungan (meaning "When the Dharma is winning), which is a national festival that occurs over a cycle of every 210 days. It is the religious belief that Gods descend to the earth on this day. During this festival a long bamboo pole called locally as penjor is made to decorate the entrance to the family compound. The festival is observed starting with the day of arrival of gods and ends on the 10th day known as Kuningan. During this temple celebrations are held every 210 days. It is known as the Odlan festival and is held in the village when child artists also give music performances. During this festival, dancing, music and elaborate decorations and food offerings are a common feature.

=== Landmarks ===
Although the village is known primarily for its artistic genre, it also contains some notable architectural landmarks and carvings.

Pura Puseh

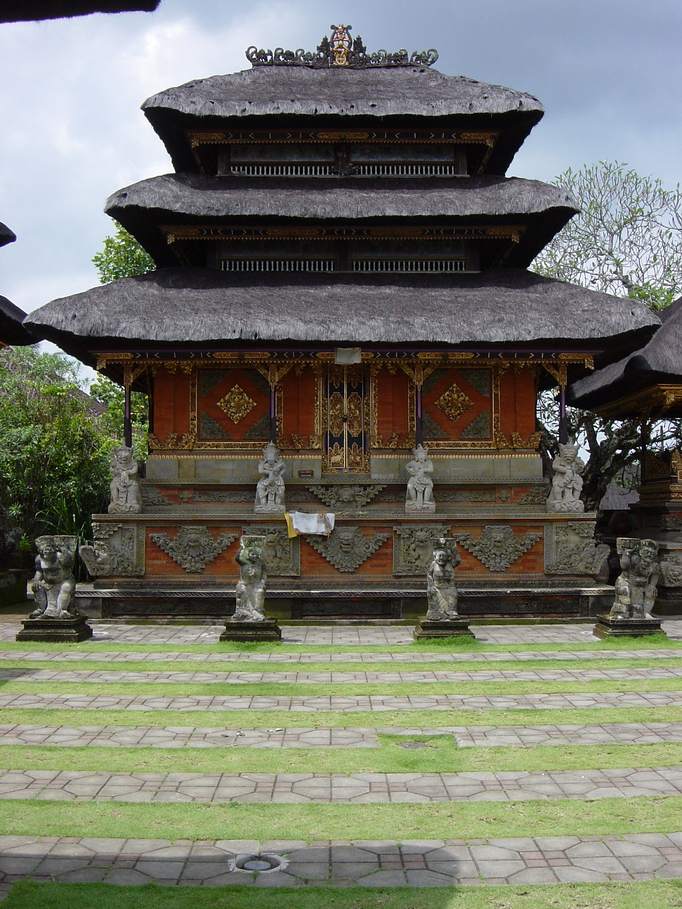
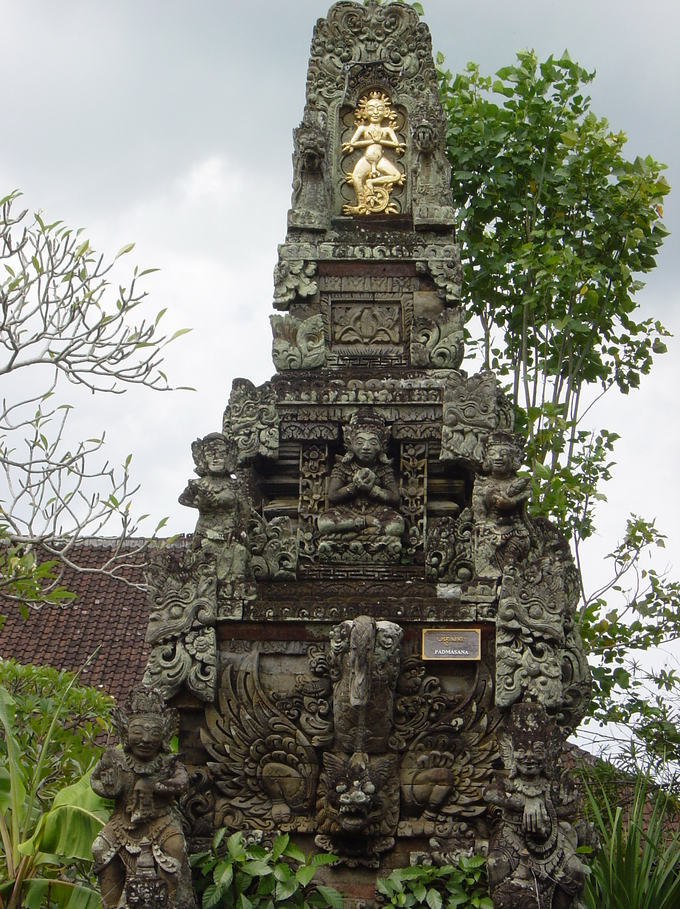
Pura Puseh. The pillar is a throne-shaped shrine dedicated to the Supreme God, whose image is carved in front of the throne.

The most notable landmark is the village temple, known as Pura Puseh, an ancient structure dated to the 11th century, embellished with intricate stone carvings. It is located in the northern part of the village, 200 metres (660 ft) off the main road. The temple also has an inscription that testifies to the date of founding of Batuan in 1022 AD. The temple underwent restoration in 1992. It is a five-tiered gateway tower, clearly influenced by Indian religious architecture. Its icons and decorations, however, are typically Balinese in style. Notable depictions include a Bhoma head overlooking the main gateway, the god Wisnu astride a bull, great elephants on the central stairway balustrade, and Siwa standing amongst skulls. The roof of the temple is made of the fibre of chromatic black palm tree. The maintenance of the temple is done by the residents of the village. The temple is situated on the main road from Denpasar to Ubud.

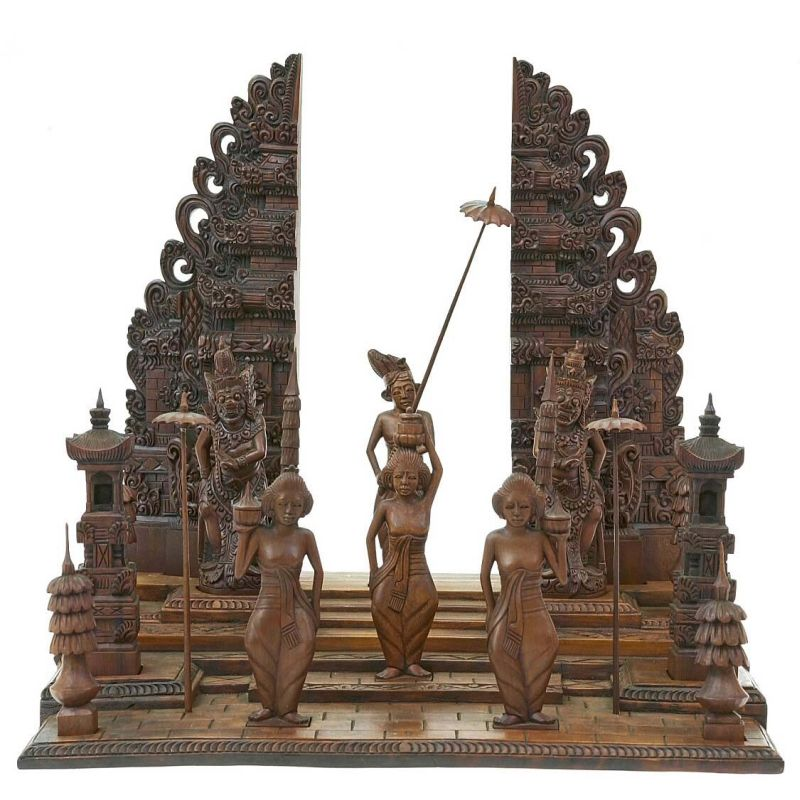
Wooden model of a split gate

The entry gate to the temple appears as a split gate as if it was formed once as one gate that was split into two parts. This gate leads into a courtyard which has a garden and a galaxy of statues fixed at various locations. From the courtyard, there is another gateway spanned by an intricately carved arch with bass relief on the inset and intertwined with vines and a closed door. The entry to the sanctum is again through two gates. The sanctum is where the gods are enthroned during festival time through a special invitation to "come down into this world." The gods invited during the festivals are venerated with deep devotion and offerings. A sign post at the temple says:

Pr Puse Pr Desa
Des Adat Basua
Saka 944

The first line makes mention of two temples – The Pura Puse and the Pura Desa – the second line defines the organization responsible for the temple and the last line 'saka 944' is in Indic and is equivalent to 1022 CE.

On the 1st and 15th of each month, the Gambuh, an ancient court dance performance, is staged at the temple. Owing to the success of tourism in Bali, a plot has been built next to the temple to put on a daily morning barong dance for tourists, enacting a fight between the good, a shaggy haired lion-like creature, and an evil widow-witch named Rangda. In the evenings, the dance troupe puts on a Kecak dance and a fire dance.

"Fat Buddha" statue

In the northern part of the village can be found a stone Buddha statue of considerable girth which marks the Sakah road to Blahbatuh, pointing east.

Nearby tourist attractions include the Santi Mandala and Spa, Balifunworld, and the Bali Zoo.

== Notable people ==
- I Nyoman Kakul (1905–1985), dancer and teacher. He was one of the first to teach women martial dances such as baris in the 1950s. He was a noted performer of topeng. Ida Bagau Togog, the foremost artist of Bali also hailed from Batuan.
