= Arie Smit =

Dutch painter (1916–2016)

- Born: Adrianus Wilhelmus Smit; 15 April 1916; Zaandam, Netherlands
- Died: 23 March 2016 (aged 99); Denpasar, Bali
- Known for: Painting

Adrianus Wilhelmus "Arie" Smit (15 April 1916 – 23 March 2016) was a Dutch-born Indonesian painter who lived on Bali.

== Early life ==
Smit was the third of eight children of a trader in cheese and confectionery in Zaandam. His family moved in 1924 to Rotterdam, where Smit eventually studied graphic design at the Academy of Arts. In his youth he was most inspired by the work of three artists named Paul (Signac, Gauguin and Cézanne). In 1938 he joined the Royal Netherlands East Indies Army. After three months he was sent to the Dutch East Indies, where he worked as a lithographer for the Dutch army's Topographical Service in Batavia, engraving relief maps of the archipelago. Etching Balinese mountains onto maps ignited his desire to one day go to Bali.

In early 1942 Smit was transferred to the infantry in East Java, but was soon captured by the invading Japanese forces. He spent three and a half years in forced labor camps building roads, bridges, and railways on the Burma Railway in Thailand, and Burma. After the Japanese capitulation in August 1945, Smit convalesced in Bangkok until January 1946. After being stationed in Denpasar, Bali as a staff writer for the infantry, he returned to the Topographical Service in Batavia in September. Until its discontinuation in 1950, he remained employed at this service, eventually becoming head of the drawing department, but in his spare time he criss-crossed Java as a painter and in October 1948 had his first exhibition in Batavia/Jakarta. After Indonesian Independence on December 27, 1949, all Dutch nationals had to choose between Dutch or Indonesian citizenship within two years. Smit briefly considered emigrating to South Africa, but decided to stay; he became an Indonesian citizen late in 1951. In the following years he taught graphics and lithography at the Institut Teknologi Bandung in West Java.

== Bali ==
On invitation by the Dutch artist Rudolf Bonnet he visited Bali in 1956, together with Dutch artist Auke Sonnega. He soon met art dealer James (Jimmy) Clarence Pandy, who ran a gallery and souvenir shop. Pandy invited Smit to stay in a house on stilts at the beach of Sanur. Smit and Pandy remained friends and formed a partnership. Pandy was well-connected; Sukarno would sometimes bring his state guests to his gallery. With his love for bright colors, Smit was captured by the Balinese landscapes in its 'riotous light', and soon decided to stay to depict its villages, rice terraces, palm trees and temples.

In 1960, while touring the village of Penestanan in the Ubud District where he then lived, he came upon some boys drawing in the sand. Impressed by their talent, Smit invited them to his studio, where they became the first of a growing number of students. With minimal instruction but much encouragement and material support, his pupils created a naive style of genre painting that became known as the 'Young Artists' style, which at its peak had 300-400 followers. Though he is considered the father of the movement, its style is quite different than any of Smit's own styles over the years.

From the time of his arrival in Bali, Smit moved some 40 times, "to see what is beyond the next hill". He stayed longest in his favorite areas of Karangasem and Buleleng. He finally settled in 1992 in the village of Sanggingan near Ubud under the patronage of Pande Wayan Suteja Neka, founder of the Neka Art Museum. In recognition for his role in the development of painting on the island, Smit received the Dharma Kusama (Flower of Devotion, a Balinese cultural award) in 1992 from the government of Bali.

The Arie Smit Pavilion was opened at the Neka Art Museum in 1994 to display his works and those of contemporary Balinese artists. The Museum Bali in Denpasar and the Penang Museum in Malaysia also have collections of his work. Smit further had exhibits in Jakarta, Singapore, Honolulu and Tokyo. Smit lived near Ubud for the rest of his life, but died on 23 March 2016, at age 99.

In April 2016, to mark the centenary of Smith's birth, a comprehensive monography appeared: "Arie Smit - A Painter's Life in the Tropics". Written by his niece, Luciënne Smit (1953, Koog aan de Zaan), it was published in both Dutch and English.

== See also ==
- I Nyoman Masriadi
- I Ketut Soki
