= Rudolf Bonnet =

Dutch painter

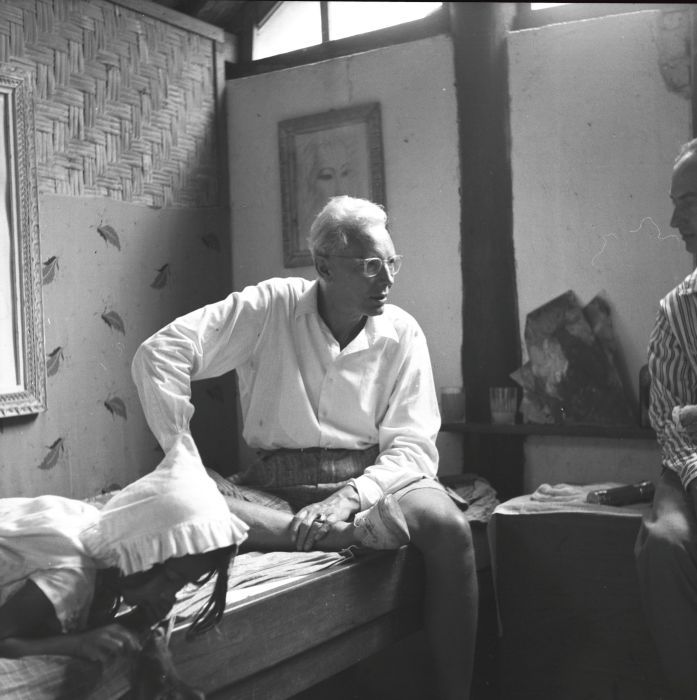
Rudolf Bonnet in conversation with the Spanish artist Antonio Blanco, in the studio of Theo Carp, Iseh, December 1953

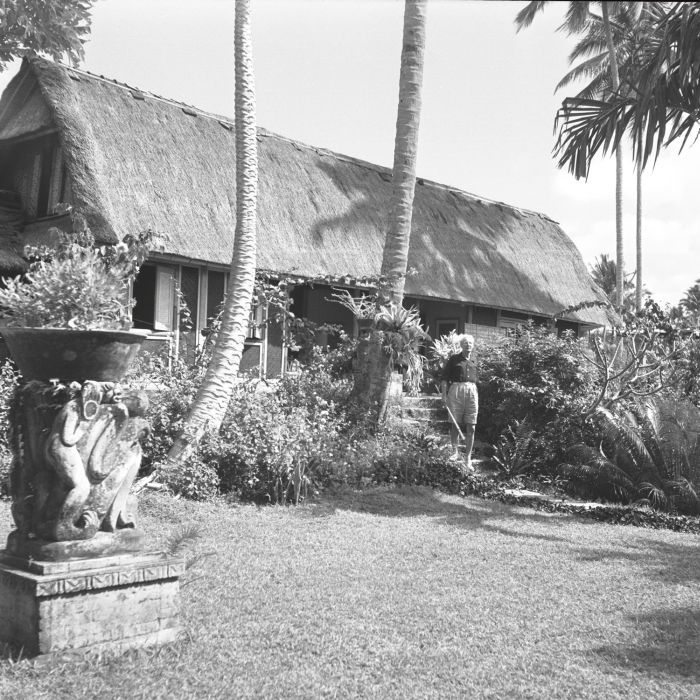
Rudolf Bonnet in front of his house in the 1950s

Johan Rudolf Bonnet (30 March 1895, Amsterdam – 18 April 1978, Laren) was a Dutch artist who lived much of his life in the town of Ubud on Bali, Indonesia. He was born into a Dutch Huguenot-descended family who had been bakers for many generations. He attended the Rijksakademie van Beeldende Kunsten in Amsterdam.

== Years before Bali ==
In 1920, he journeyed to Italy with his parents, during which trip he produced an enormous number of drawings of people, village scenes and landscapes. He returned to Italy and rented a studio for some months. In Rome, he met W.O.J. Nieuwenkamp who advised him to visit Bali, but Bonnet first went to North Africa. The paintings he did on this trip were exhibited and sold sufficiently to enable him to sail to Bali

== Bali ==
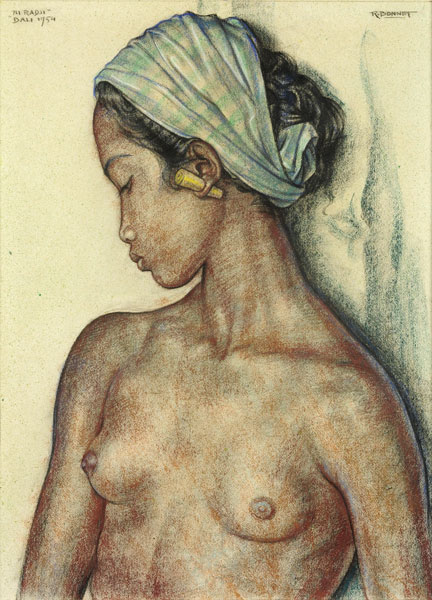
Rudolf Bonnet's "Ni Radji" Bali 1954

He arrived in Bali in 1929 where he met the German artist Walter Spies and the Dutch musicologist Jaap Kunst. With Kunst, he made a trip to Nias, returning to Bali in 1930. He was invited to live in Ubud in by Cokorda Gde Raka Sukawati. Between 1929 and 1940 Bonnet stayed in Ubud. When Spies moved to Campuhan, Bonnet took over Spies' water palace in Ubud and set up his studio. He became involved in community issues including healthcare and education. He was also very involved in the Pita Maha movement, which encouraged local artists to raise their artistic standards. After the Japanese arrived in Bali, Bonnet remained free until 1942 when he was ordered to be sent to Sulawesi. He spent the remainder of World War II in internment camps in Pare-Pare, Bolong and Makassar. In 1947 Bonnet returned to Bali where he built his house and studio in Campuan. Despite the deterioration in the relationship between The Republic of Indonesia and the Netherlands Bonnet was able to stay due to his relationship with President Sukarno who had collected 14 of his works. He was expelled from Indonesia in 1957 after he refused to finish a portrait of President Sukarno; he was able to return 15 years later.

== Pita Maha ==
Bonnet, together with Walter Spies, I Gusti Nyoman Lempad and Cokorde Gde Agung Sukawati formed the Pita Maha (Great Spirit, Guiding inspiration) in 1936 to select the artists whose works were found to be good enough to be sold in a number of galleries and to be included in exhibitions elsewhere in the Indies, The Netherlands and the United States. The Pita Maha disintegrated after Spies was expelled, having been convicted of indecent behavior. Bonnet also left and after that the war broke out.

== Museum Puri Lukisan ==
Museum Puri Lukisan, 'The palace of Paintings' was constructed according to Bonnet's design to house the collection of high-quality art that Bonnet and Cokorda Gde Agung Sukawati had assembled. Construction commenced in 1954. After his expulsion in 1957 many attempts were made to persuade him to return to Bali. He finally returned in 1972, when he helped expand the museum and organized an opening exhibition.

== Death ==
Rudolf Bonnet died in Laren, Holland on 18 April 1978 after a long illness. His body was cremated and the ashes were brought to Bali where they were burnt together in a great cremation ceremony with his friend Cokorda Gde Agung Sukawati.

== Gallery ==
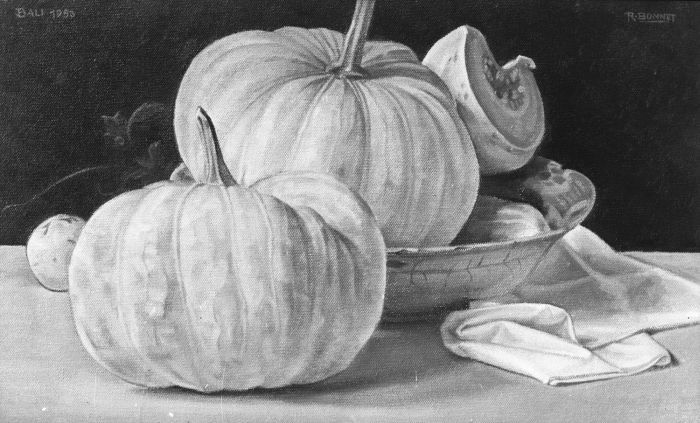
Still life with pumpkins (1950s)

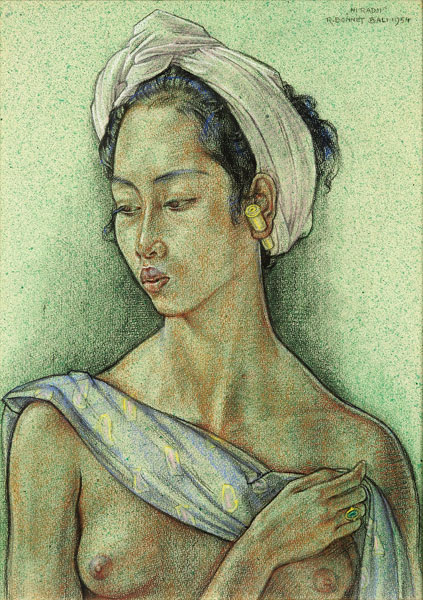
Ni Radji Bali (1954)

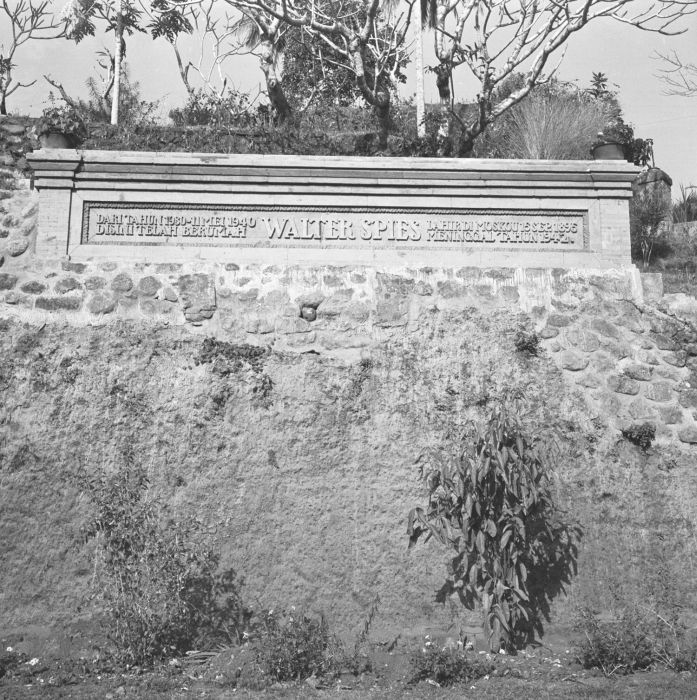
Monument dedicated to Walter Spies

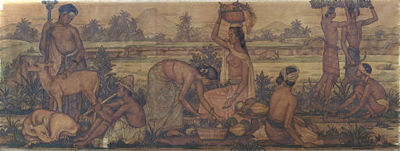
Market scene
