= Walter Spies =

German artist

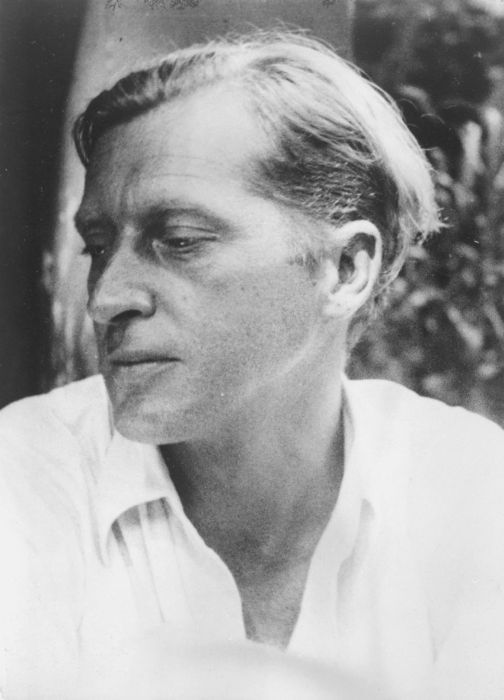
- Walter Spies
- Born: 15 September 1895; Moscow, Imperial Russia
- Died: 19 January 1942 (aged 46) west of Nias, Indian Ocean
- Style: Primitivist

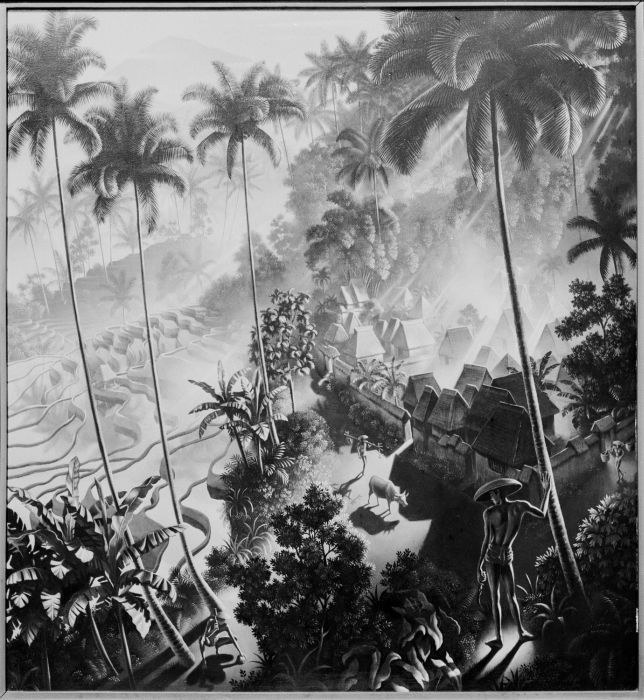
Iseh at dawn

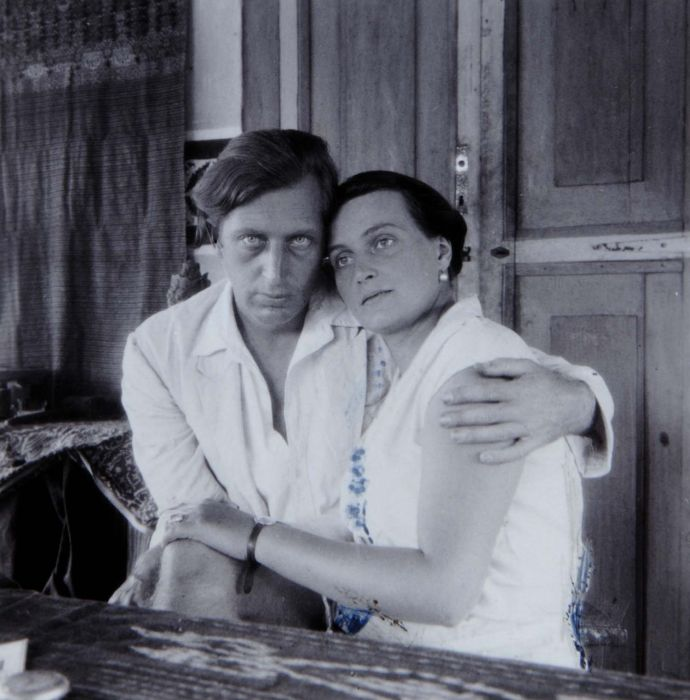
Walter Spies with Angelica Archipenko c. 1930

Walter Spies (15 September 1895 – 19 January 1942) was a German primitivist painter, composer, musicologist, and curator. In 1923 he moved to Java, Indonesia. He lived in Yogyakarta and then in Ubud, Bali starting from 1927, when Indonesia was under European colonial rule as the Dutch East Indies.

Spies is often credited with attracting the attention of Western cultural figures to Balinese culture and art in the 1930s, as he became internationally known and hosted numerous anthropologists, actors, artists and other cultural figures. Spies influenced the direction of Balinese art and drama.

After the outbreak of war in Europe, Spies was arrested as a German national and interned by the Dutch authorities as an enemy alien. In 1942 he was among 477 German internees who were deported by the Dutch to Ceylon, but their ship was bombed by Japanese planes. Spies and most of the other prisoners died at sea.

== Life and work ==
Spies was born in 1895 in Moscow to a German diplomat and his wife who were posted there. The family returned to Germany, where he was educated. He had a brother Leo, who became a composer and conductor, and sister Daisy, who became a ballet dancer. He began painting as a young man and was known in Europe for his work by 1923. He also studied music, including that of other cultures.

In 1923 he moved to Java, Indonesia, then known as the Dutch East Indies under colonial control. In 1927 he resettled in Bali.

Mexican artist and anthropologist Miguel Covarrubias lived and researched in Bali in the 1930s with his wife Rose, where they became friends with Spies. He later wrote that Spies left the social disruption of Europe after the Great War and ultimately reached Java. The Sultan of Djokjakarta asked him to organize and lead a Western orchestra. Spies studied their music while living in the court. He visited Bali, under European control as part of the Dutch East Indies, and decided to stay there.

Covarrubias and Spies became very close. Covarrubias wrote about his friend: "The months went by as Rose and I roamed all over the island with Spies, watching strange ceremonies, enjoying their music, listening to fantastic tales, camping in the wilds of West Bali or on the coral reefs of Sanur. Walter loved to collect velvety dragonflies, strange spiders and sea-slugs, not in a naturalist's box, but in minutely accurate drawings. For days at a time he would be in his tent drawing them, because once dead, their beautiful colors disappeared. He was temperamental when he went into seclusion to paint, he would work incessantly for months on one of his rare canvases. (...). He also painted dreamlike landscapes in which every branch and every leaf is carefully painted, done with the love of a Persian miniaturist, a Cranach, a Breughel or a Douanier Rousseau".

The knowledge of every aspect of Balinese culture that Spies provided for Covarrubias' research was well-acknowledged by the latter. "In his charming devil-may-care way, Spies was familiar with every phase of Balinese life and was the constant source of disinterested information to every archaeologist, anthropologist, musician or artist who has come to Bali. His assistance was given generously and without expecting even the reward of credit". "Spies was the first to appreciate and record Balinese music, he collected every pattern of Balinese art, contributed to Dutch scientific journals – the Dutch were the colonial power in Bali since 30 years earlier – he created the Bali Museum of which he was the curator, and built a splendid aquarium".

In 1937, Spies built what he described as a "mountain hut" at Iseh in Karangasem. Spies was the co-founder of the Pita Maha artists cooperative, through which he shaped the development of modern Balinese art. During the 1930s he hosted many Westerners in Bali, including actors, artists, and writers, and he is believed to have established the image of Bali that many Westerners still have.

After living for nine years at the confluence of two rivers in Campuan (Ubud), Spies retired to Iseh. This mountain retreat was the setting of some of his most beautiful and atmospheric paintings, including Iseh im Morgenlicht 1938. Despite saying he wanted to escape from visitors, Spies still received guests at Iseh, including musician Colin McPhee and his wife, anthropologist Jane Belo, Swiss artist Theo Meier and Austrian novelist Vicki Baum. Vicki Baum accredits Spies with providing her the factual historical data and details on Balinese culture which she drew from for her historical fiction novel Love and Death in Bali (1937). It was set in the time of the Dutch intervention in Bali (1906).

While homosexuality was traditionally tolerated "as a harmless pastime" in Bali, the Dutch age of consent for homosexuality was 21 at that time, considerably higher than for heterosexual acts. Under the shadow of rising fascism in Europe, in late 1938 "a witch-hunt was started against homosexuality", with newspapers launching "smear campaigns" against anyone suspected of such inclinations. The colonial authorities decided to enforce the laws as strictly as possible and arrested more than a hundred suspects, leading to a "series of suicides, dismissals, broken marriages and ruined careers".

In late December 1938, Spies was arrested and charged with sexual acts with a minor (below 21). Though the father of his young friend did not understand why the authorities made such a "fuss", pointing out that relationship was consensual and Spies "is after all our best friend", he was convicted to a period in prison, from which he was released on 1 September 1939.

Soon after, however, he was again arrested and interned together with the other German nationals on the island, since World War II had broken out. He and 477 other internees were deported in January 1942 on board of SS Van Imhoff, bound for Ceylon. On 19 January 1942 a Japanese bomb hit the ship. Because the crew were ordered not to evacuate the Germans, most of the prisoners on the ship, including Spies, drowned.

== Representation in other media ==
- Anthropologist Nigel Barley wrote a novel Island of Demons (2009), loosely based on Spies's life. Reviewer Tim Hannigan in the Jakarta Globe called the book "a highly amusing read", praising especially the "sparky dialogue" and the "characterizations of the key foreign players", though suggesting that "the idea that [Spies's] relationships with young Balinese men could have been predatory and exploitative should have been given more than the brief touch it receives".
- In 2009, Spies was portrayed by tenor Timur Bekbosunov in a production directed by Jay Scheib of an opera A House in Bali by Evan Ziporyn at Cal Performances and Brooklyn Academy of Music's BAM Next Wave Festival in 2010.
- Anuradha Roy's novel All the Lives We Never Lived (2018) brings together fictional and historical figures in the plot, including Walter Spies. She portrays him as spending time in India in a passage before going to Bali. The novel includes such historical events as Spies's two imprisonments and death at sea. Roy portrays the artist sympathetically, based on John Stowell's biography and other sources.

== See also ==
- Balinese art
- Balinese dance
- Hinduism in Indonesia
