= List of Indonesian artists =

This is a list of visual artists from, or associated, with Indonesia.

== A ==
- Basuki Abdullah (1915–1993), painter
- Affandi (1907–1990), painter
- Kartika Affandi-Koberl (born 1934), artist
- Mochtar Apin (1923–1994), painter and lecturer
- Arahmaiani (born 1961), performance artist
- Avianti Armand (born 1969), artist

== B ==
- Antonio Blanco (1912–1999), Philippine-born Indonesian painter
- Rudolf Bonnet (1895–1978), Dutch-born Indonesian painter

== D ==
- Hasan Djaafar (1919–1995), painter
- Heri Dono (born 1960), installation artist

== F ==
- Lee Man Fong (1913–1988), painter

== G ==
- Slamet Gundono (1966–2004), artist and puppeteer

== I ==
- Samuel Indratma (born 1970), muralist

== J ==
- Mella Jaarsma (born 1960), textiles
- Marina Joesoef (born 1959), painter

== K ==
- Sudjana Kerton (1922–1994), painter

== L ==
- I Gusti Nyoman Lempad (c.1862–1978), sculptor and architect

== M ==
- Ida Bagus Made (1915–1999), painter
- Nyoman Masriadi (born 1973), painter
- I Nyoman Masriadi (born 1973), Balinese artist and painter
- Yovita Meta (born 1955), fashion designer and craft artist
- Mochtar Apin (1923–1994), painter
- Mangku Muriati (born 1967), painter

== N ==
- I Nyoman Ngendon (1906–1946), painter

== P ==
- J Ariadhitya Pramuhendra (born 1984), painter
- Petrus Kaseke (born 1942), Kolintang conservationist

== R ==
- Ida Bagus Nyoman Rai (c.1917–2000), painter

== S ==
- Ivan Sagita (born 1957), painter
- Raden Saleh (1811–1880), painter
- Siti Adiyati (born 1951), installation artist and painter
- Arie Smit (1916–2016), Dutch-born Indonesian painter
- Han Snel (1925–1998), Dutch-born Indonesian painter
- Anak Agung Gde Sobrat (1912–1992), painter
- I Ketut Soki (born 1946), painter
- Walter Spies (1895–1942), Russian-born Indonesian painter
- Tjokorda Krishna Putra Sudharsana (born 1956), painter
- Jim Supangkat (born 1948), sculptor and curator

== T ==
- Fiona Tan (born 1966), installation artist
- Tio Tjay (born 1946), painter
- Titarubi (born 1968)
- Ida Bagus Made Togog (1913–1989), painter

== U ==
- Umi Dachlan (1942–2009), painter and lecturer

== W ==
- Made Wianta (born 1949), painter

== Y ==
- Yunizar (born 1971), painter
