= List of Indonesian painters =

Below is the list of painters from Indonesia or the Dutch Indies.

== Painters born in the Indonesian archipelago ==
- Raden Saleh (1811–1880), the first modern painter in Indonesia
- Abdullah Suriosubroto (also known as Abdullah the Elder) (1878-1941)
- Ernest Dezentjé (1885–1972), landscape painter
- Wakidi (1890–1979)
- Soewardja (b. 1900), painter who specialized in watercolor
- Affandi (1907–1990), Indonesia's foremost Expressionist painter
- Agus Djaya (1913-1994), modernist painter and nationalist activist
- S. Sudjojono (1913-1986), the founder of Modernism in Indonesia and nationalist activist
- Anak Agung Gde Sobrat (1912–1992)
- Basuki Abdullah (1915–1993), realist painter
- Ida Bagus Made (1915–1999), Balinese painter
- Otto Djaya (1916-2002), brother of Agus Djaya and member of Indonesian Painters Association
- Hendra Gunawan (1918–1983), expressionist painter from West Java
- Hasan Djaafar (1919–1995), expressionist painter
- Sudjana Kerton (1922–1994)
- Mochtar Apin (1923–1994), abstract painter
- Ahmad Sadali (1924–1987), painter and lecturer at the ITB-Bandung
- Trubus Sudarsono (1926–c. 1966), painter and lecturer at the Indonesian Academy of Art
- Popo Iskandar (1927–2000), painter and essayist
- Srihadi Soedarsono (b. 1931), painter and lecturer
- Abdul Djalil Pirous (b. 1932), painter and lecturer
- Kartika Affandi-Koberl (b. 1934)
- Djoko Pekik (1937–2023), painter and sculptor
- Mustofa Bisri (b. 1944), Islamic teacher, leader, poet and painter
- Umi Dachlan (1943–2009), painter and lecturer at the ITB-Bandung
- Tio Tjay (b. 1946)
- I Ketut Soki (b. 1946)
- Nunung W. S. (b. 1948), abstract painter
- Marina Joesoef (b. 1959)
- Yunizar (b. 1971)
- I Nyoman Masriadi (b. 1973), Balinese artist and painter

== Foreign-born Indonesian Painters ==
- Fredericus van Rossum du Chattel (1856–1917), Dutch-born landscape painter active in Java and Sumatra
- Antonio Blanco (1912–1999), Philippine-born Indonesian painter
- Rudolf Bonnet (1895–1978), Dutch-born Indonesian painter
- Lee Man Fong (1913–1988), Chinese-born Indonesian painter
- Adrien-Jean Le Mayeur (1880–1958), Belgium-born Indonesian painter
- Ries Mulder (1909–1973), Dutch-born Indonesian painter and lecturer
- Arie Smit (1916–2016), Dutch-born Indonesian painter
- Han Snel (1925–1998), Dutch-born Indonesian painter
- Walter Spies (1895–1942), Russian-born Indonesian painter
- Symon (1947–2020), American-born Indonesian painter, aka Ronald Thomas Bierl
- Richard Winkler (b: 1969), Swedish-born Indonesian painter
