= Han (given name) =

Han is a Dutch masculine given name or nickname. It can be a short form of Johannes, Hendrik or Henricus. People with the name include:

== Men ==
- Han Ahmedow (1936–2006), Prime Minister of Turkmenistan
- Han Bennink (born 1942), Dutch jazz musician
- Han van den Berg (1925–2015), Dutch rower
- Han Berger (born 1950), Dutch football player and coach
- Han Bergsma (born 1961), Dutch sailor
- Han ten Broeke (born 1969), Dutch VVD politician
- Han Dade (1878–1940), Dutch sports director, co-founder of FC Ajax
- Han T. Dinh, director of vehicle engineering for the United States Postal Service
- Han van Dissel (born 1956), Dutch business theorist
- Han Drijver (1927–1986), Dutch field hockey player
- Han Grijzenhout (1932–2020), Dutch football player and manager
- Han Groenewegen (1888–1980), Dutch architect
- Han G. Hoekstra (1908–1988), Dutch poet and children's writer
- Han Hollander (1886–1943), Dutch radio sports journalist
- Han Hoogerbrugge (born 1963), Dutch digital artist
- Han Kulker (born 1959), Dutch middle distance runner
- Johannes Bernardus van Loghem (1881–1940), Dutch architect, furniture designer and town planner
- Johan van Lom (Dutch collaborator) (1918–1945), Dutch World War II figure
- Lu Han (born 1990), Chinese singer
- Han van Meegeren (1889–1947), Dutch painter and forger
- Han Meijer (born 1949), Dutch polymer chemist
- Han Nefkens (born 1954), Dutch writer and art collector
- Han Nijssen (1935–2013), Dutch ichthyologist
- Han Nolan (born 1956), American writer of young adult fiction
- Han Hendrik Piho (born 1993), Estonian Nordic skier
- Han Polman (born 1963), Dutch D66 politician, King's Commissioner of Zeeland
- Han Ryner (1861–1938), pseudonym of Jacques Élie H.A. Ner, French philosopher, activist and novelist
- Han Schröder (1918–1992), Dutch architect and educator
- Han Schuil (born 1958), Dutch multimedia artist
- Han van Senus (1900–1976), Dutch water polo player
- Han Snel (1925–1998), Dutch-born Indonesian painter on Bali
- Han Stijkel (1911–1943), Dutch Resistance activist
- Tian Han (1898–1968), Chinese activist and playwright
- Han Vinck (born 1950s), Dutch information theorist
- Han de Vries (born 1941), Dutch oboist
- Han F. de Wit (born 1944), Dutch research psychologist
- Han Woerdman (1942–2020), Dutch physicist
- Han Yerry (1724–1794), Oneida Native American who fought in the American Revolutionary War
- Han Zuilhof (born 1965), Dutch organic chemist

== Women ==
- Han Nolan (born 1956), American writer of young adult fiction
