= Indonesian New Art Movement =

Art movement in Indonesia, 1974 to 1989

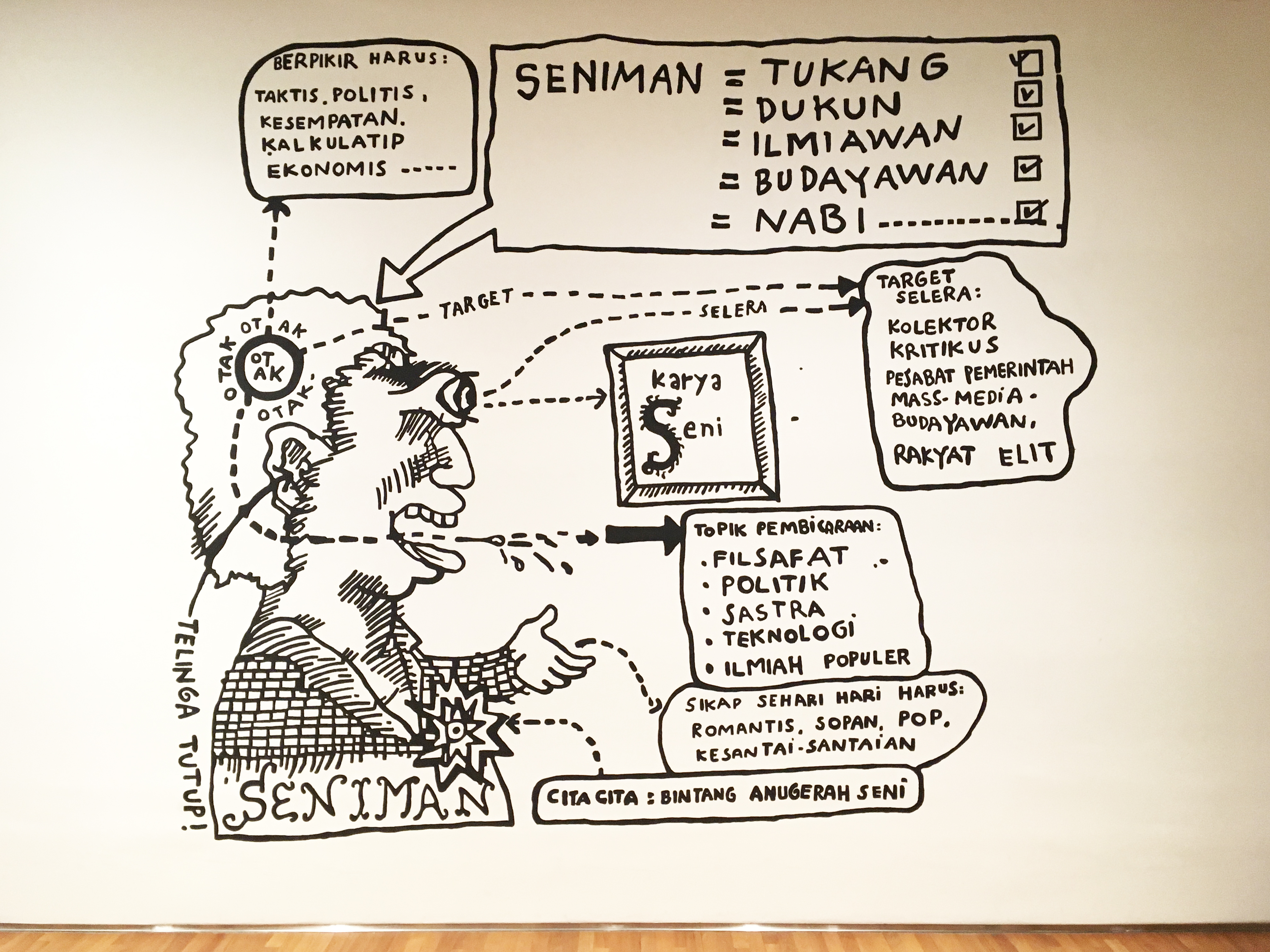
Priyanto Sunarto, Seniman, 1976, reconstructed 2015, Line drawing on wall, Collection of National Gallery Singapore

The Indonesia New Art Movement, also known as Gerakan Seni Rupa Baru (GSRB) was an art movement of young artists from Bandung and Yogyakarta against the institutional concept of fine art (Indonesian: Seni Rupa) in Indonesia being limited to paintings and sculptures. The movement emerged in 1974, first organised in a protest against the judging of the Second Jakarta Painting Biennale which awarded prizes to decorative style of paintings and sculptures. The protesters published the Black December Statement (Desember Hitam) criticising the lack of social and political consciousness throughout decorative art practices in Indonesia.

The "new art" championed installations, ready-mades, photographs, found-objects and photo-realist paintings, which translate to the experimentation of different mediums and mixed media in Indonesian contemporary art. In 1987, a manifesto was written by key figures of the New Art Movement titled "Fine Art of Emancipation, Emancipation of Fine Art."

The New Art Movement ended in 1989 and is considered the beginning of contemporary art in Indonesia.

== History ==
In 1974, a group of young artists emerged calling themselves the New Art Movement. The movement was first and foremost an academic rebellion towards fine arts universities in Bandung and Yogyakarta, rejecting the institution's definition of fine art that was limited to decorative art, paintings and sculptures.

The New Art Movement arose spontaneously in both Yogyakarta and Bandung, the two groups having little contact with each other. It was the art critic Sanento Yuliman, a teacher at Bandung Institute of Technology (Indonesian: Institut Teknologi Bandung or ITB), who noticed the anti-modernist tendency common between the two. He then joined them together under the name New Art Movement.

The movement first began in a protest against the judging of the Second Jakarta Painting Biennale of 1974, which awarded prizes to decorative styles of paintings. Protesters consisting of young artists from Bandung and Yogyakarta published the Black December Statement criticising the lack of social and political consciousness in decorative art, and declaring that it was indicative of the lack of creativity in Indonesian art.

Artists of the New Art Movement perceived decorative art as elitist and centralised on Western-derive aesthetics, which they claim were irrelevant to both Indonesia's traditional arts and to the issues of contemporary society. They wanted a more democratic and accessible art, in medium and in style.

By 1977, after the first Exhibition of the New Art Movement in Taman Ismail Marzuki, it was clear that the movement was against any narrow definition of art. They claimed that the existing rigid definition of fine art hindered the development of contemporary art and creativity in Indonesia. The movement emphasised the importance of redefining art and its purpose, supporting the basis for its name: "new art"

The movement's exhibitions in 1975-1980 and in 1987-1989 introduced artworks other than paintings and sculptures, championing installations, ready-mades, photographs, found-objects and photo-realist paintings.

On 2 May 1987, a manifesto was published by key figures of the New Art Movement titled "Fine Art of Emancipation, Emancipation of Fine Art."

The New Art Movement ended in 1989 and is considered the beginning of Indonesian contemporary art. Notable figures of the movement include Jim Supangkat, the art historian Sanento Yuliman, Dede Eri Supria, Dadang Christanto and FX Harsono.

== Black December Statement ==
On 31 December 1974, Muryotohartoyo, Juzwar, Harsono, B. Munni Ardhi, M. Sulebar, Ris Purwana, Daryono, Adiyati, D.A. Peransi, Baharuddin Marasutan, Ikranegara, Adri Darmadji, Hardi and Abdul Hadi WM, presented the Black December Statement.

The statement critiques Indonesia's lack of clear cultural strategy in art making, and that the producers of arts and culture are not in the smallest sense aware of the discourse regarding the most basic human problems in Indonesian culture.

The Black December statements are as follow:

1. That the diversity of Indonesian painting is a reality that may not be denied, nonetheless this diversity does not in itself show healthy development.

2. That in order to guarantee a sustainable cultural development painters are beckoned to provide spiritual directions that are based on the values of humanity, and are oriented to the realities of social life and political-economic culture.

3. That creativity is the destiny of painters that go through whatever means possible in order to arrive at new perspectives for Indonesian painting.

4. That therefore the identity of Indonesian painting has an immediate and clear existence.

5. That what creates dead-end for the development of Indonesian painting to this day is old and over-used concepts, that are still held on to by the establishment, arts and cultural producers and established artists.

Note: The Black December Statement is translated from Bahasa Indonesia to English in 2015 after the collaborative efforts of the Indonesian Visual Art Archive (IVAA) and Asia Art Archive.

== Manifesto ==
Thirteen years after the Black December Statement was presented, the New Art Movement published a manifesto titled "Fine Art of Emancipation, Emancipation of Fine Art." The manifesto was presented in Jakarta on 2 May 1987.

The manifesto states three key proclamations:

1. Fine art needs emancipation. Expression of visual art should prioritise the deconstruction of misunderstood traditions of fine art. Rational visual art expression should prioritise statements based on the aesthetics of emancipation.

2. A redefinition of fine art is required, to free it from the definition rooted in artes-liberals – seek a new definition which can accommodate every expression of visual art.

3. Emancipation of encultured thought is required to counter isolated points of view that only acknowledge one notion of art, and only one global society within a unified harmonious culture.

The movement also made an explicit statement in relation to the third proclamation:

"In addition to a new definition, development of Indonesian contemporary art also needed basic aesthetic thinking and a study of art history to replace the cultural identity debate and East-West confrontation"

The manifesto was deemed successful in the way installation and conceptual art becomes immersive in modern Indonesian art compared to the few previous attempts which had no manifesto to back them up.

== Style and Development ==
The "new art" primarily consists of installations, ready-mades, photographs, found-objects and photo-realist paintings.

=== Development ===
The New Art Movement was anti-modernist. It rejected modern art's purity of expression, the individualism of the artist, and the tendency toward the decorative as the highest form of art. As the movement developed, the works of New Art artists began to take on the character of installations and collaborative practices.

In an arguably post-modern approach, the movement also aims to tear down the barrier between high art and low art. The interest of the New Art artists in low art was closely linked to the problems of poverty in the city and maintenance of traditional culture in rural regions.

=== Style and Concept ===
The style and concept of New Art artists are characteristically different to contemporary Indonesian art in the present day, which consists of post-reformasi artists known most commonly as Generation 2000. Although the installation and mixed-media format of this newer generation of artists is heavily influenced by the New Art Movement, their concerns are significantly different.

New Art artists experience politics in a more strident environment before the end of the Suharto regime, which strongly inform their art practice. In such ways, artists like FX Harsono and Dadang Christanto comment on specific tragedies in Indonesian history most notably the Indonesian mass killings of 1965–1966. Many of the New Art artists emphasised social criticism in their works.

Contemporary readings and studies of the New Art Movement propose that memories are central to the works of these artists. Their works become a site of remembrance, recollections of the past, and reconciliation that reference the power struggle of the 'common people', the marginalised, and the severe consequences of socio-political tensions that occurred in that time.

== Issues and Debates ==
The New Art Movement was often criticised by the conservative art establishment as a derivative to Pop Art, although leading New Art artist FX Harsono claims that the artists were more interested in Neo-Dada than Pop Art.

This conversation with the West, presented in a rather revolutionary manner by New Art artists, returns to the modernist debate about East-West confrontation in art of developing countries.

In the interest of 'national identity', the New Art Movement was criticised to have championed avant-garde mediums and concepts of Western art history instead of embracing the nation's traditional values that makes it characteristically "Indonesian." The movement tackled this issue by emphasising the importance of basic aesthetic thinking and a study of art history to replace the cultural identity debate.

Also critical to the progression of the New Art Movement is clarifying the positions of contemporary art and traditional art. Artists and critics responds to this struggle by claiming that "traditional art is not something of the past, but is still alive and evolves like contemporary art." In other words, New Art artists sought to merge the two art forms in their contemporary art practice.

In the latter part of the 1980s, the New Art Movement concluded that "art is a plural concept," embracing installations as its primary/hybrid format in ending the East-West confrontation debates and claiming the inter-relationship of contemporary and traditional art.

The issues and methods involved in the New Art movement play an important part in the great interest on cultural identity that emerged in Indonesia in the 1980s, and continue to inform the practice of contemporary art in the present day.

== Artists ==
Below is a list of artists belonging to the Indonesian New Art movement.

- Agus Tjahjono
- Anyool Soebroto
- B. Munni Ardhi
- Bachtiar Zainoel
- Dadang Christanto
- Dede Eri Supria
- Freddy Sofian
- FX Harsono
- Hardi
- Jim Supangkat
- Nanik Mirna
- Nyoman Nuarta
- Pandu Sudewo
- Ris Purwana
- S. Prinka
- Sanento Yuliman
- Satyagraha
- Siti Adiyati Subangun
- Wagiono S.

== List of GSRB Exhibitions ==
- Exhibition of the Indonesian New Art Movement 1975 (Pameran Seni Rupa Baru Indonesia 1975) - 2–7 August 1975, Ruang Pameran Taman Ismail Marzuki.
- Exhibition of the Indonesian New Art Movement 1977 (Pameran Seni Rupa Baru Indonesia 1977) - 23–28 February 1977, Ruang Pameran Taman Ismail Marzuki.
- Exhibition of the Indonesian New Art Movement 1977 (Pameran Seni Rupa Baru Indonesia 1977) - 12–16 April 1977, Ruang Pamer Perhimpunan Kebudayaan Indonesia-Perancis.
- Exhibition of the Indonesian New Art Movement 1979 ( Pameran Seni Rupa Baru Indonesia 1979) - 9–20 October 1979, Ruang Pameran Taman Ismail Marzuki.
- New Art: Project 1 - Pasaraya Dunia Fantasi (Seni Rupa Baru: Proyek 1) 15–30 June 1987, Galeri Baru Taman Ismail Marzuki.
- New Art: Project 2 - The Silent World (Seni Rupa Baru: Proyek 2) 13–18 September 1989, Galeri Baru Taman Ismail Marzuki.
- New Art: Project 2 - The Silent World (Seni Rupa Baru: Proyek 2) 1–14 October 1989. Exhibited in the Australia and Regions Artists Exchange: Metro Mania, Perth.
- New Art: Project 2 - The Silent World (Seni Rupa Baru: Proyek 2) Exhibited in Chameleon Contemporary Art Space, Hobart, Tasmania.
