= Gajah Gallery =

Art gallery in Singapore

Gajah Gallery is an art gallery in Singapore that hosts artwork related to the socio-cultural interests of Asia. It was established in 1995 by Jasdeep Sandhu and promotes Southeast Asian Contemporary Art with an emphasis on Indonesian Contemporary. The gallery holds exhibitions, some of which have been collaborations with the Singapore Art Museum (SAM) and the National University of Singapore Museum (NUS). Gajah Gallery is also a member of Art Galleries Association in Singapore.

== Description ==
Gajah Gallery displays, promotes and researches Southeast Asian art. The collection was previously housed at the MICA building, adjacent to Singapore City Hall and close to the Singapore Philatelic Museum, Singapore Art Museum and National Museum of Singapore.

The MICA building, formerly known as the Old Hill Street Police Station, was erected in 1934 to house the Hill Street Police Station and Barracks, and was gazetted as a national monument in 1998 and transformed into premises for MICA.

In 2015, Gajah Gallery moved to an even bigger space located at Tanjong Pagar Distripark. The new space features white walls over 18 ft high and 4500 sqft of floor space. It is situated in a fully operational shipping warehouse on the historic port of Tanjong Pagar.

Following that, Gajah Gallery also opened up a second space in Indonesia's arts capital, Yogyakarta. Yogya Art Lab (YAL) is an experimental platform for prominent and emerging artists to come together to produce works across various mediums such as paper, sculpture, performance and digital visual production. As for now, the lab has collaborated with established artists like Yunizar and Ashley Bickerton in producing some of their finest bronze and aluminium sculptures respectively.

== Collections and exhibitions ==
Gajah Gallery focuses on displaying contemporary Southeast Asian art from the region, including art from Singapore. The Gallery exclusively represents six of the leading Indonesian contemporary artists, Nyoman Masriadi, Rudi Mantofani, Yunizar, Handiwirman Sahputra, Yusra Martunus and Jumaldi Alfi. This limited scope ensures that the Gallery fulfill's their primary mission which is to gain representation for the artist before increasing their stable of artists.

Year	Exhibition	Artist	Country	Venue
1996	A celebration of Culture	Truong Dinh Hao, U Aung Soe, Wayan Paramartha, Surachet Kaewchamras	Vietnam, Indonesia, Thailand	Alliance Francaise (Singapore)
1997	Illusion Myth and Reality	Entang Wiharso	Indonesia	Gajah Gallery
1998	Bleeding in the Sun	Gorbadhan Ash	India	Gajah Gallery
1998	Mystical Monsters in Contemporary Society	Heri Dono	Indonesia	The American Club (Singapore)
1999	Myths and Mystic	I Made Djirna and Wayan Paramartha	Indonesia	Gajah Gallery
1999	Waiting for Nothing	Vasan Sitthiket	Thailand	Gajah Gallery
2000	Between Abstract and Figurative	Sporean artists including Thomas Yeo, Koh Sia Yong, Tang Da Wu	Singapore	Gajah Gallery
2000	Sau	Dinh Quan, Bui Huu Hung, Phan Cam Thuong, Bang Sy Truc, Hong Viet Dung, Nguyen Thanh Binh	Vietnamese	Gajah Gallery
2000	Heart of Yogya	Nasirun and Pupuk Daru Purnomo	Indonesia	Gajah Gallery
2000	In Full Bloom	Olga Polunin	Singapore	Gajah Gallery
2000	Rustic Charm	Chandra Bhattacharjee, Gautam Basu	India	Gajah Gallery
2001	Unbound Linearity	Jogen Chowdhury	India	Gajah Gallery
2001	Vietnamese Affair	Dinh Quan, Bang Sy Truc, Dao Ha Phong, Le Thiet Cuong, Quach Dong Phuong, Nguyen Quoc Hoi, Nguyen Xuan Tiep	Vietnam	Gajah Gallery
2001	Of Land and Tradition	Pham Cam Thuong, Bang Sy Truc	Vietnam	Gajah Gallery
2001	Silent Spaces	Ali Esmaelipour	Iran	Gajah Gallery
2001	Interactions	Jaya Ganguly	India	Gajah Gallery
2001	Fingerprint of an Artist	Haji Widayat	Indonesia	Gajah Gallery
2001	The New Sensation	Yunizar	Indonesia	Gajah Gallery
2001	Fortress of the Heart	Heri Dono	Indonesia	Gajah Gallery
2002	Truth and Tradition	Nyoman Sukari	Indonesia	Gajah Gallery
2002	Taksu	I Made Djirna	Indonesia	Gajah Gallery
2002	10 Wasted Years	Jason Lim	Singapore	Gajah Gallery
2005	Expressions on Paper	Mochtar Apin	Indonesia	Gajah Gallery
2005	Between A Glass and two Bottles	Nguyen Trung and I Made Djirna	Vietnam and Indonesia	Gajah Gallery
2006	Drawing Ground	Srihadi Soedarsono and Chua Ek Kay	Indonesia and Singapore	SAM and Gajah Gallery
2007	Coretan : Recent Works by Yunizar	Yunizar	Indonesia	NUS Museum and Gajah Gallery
2008	Silent Words	Mangu Putra	Indonesia	Gajah Gallery
2008	Black is my Last Weapon	Nyoman Masriadi	Indonesia	SAM and Gajah Gallery
2009	JENDELA: A Play of The Ordinary	Handiwirman Saputra, Jumaldi Alfi, Yusra Martunus, Rudi Mantofani, Yunizar	Indonesia	NUS Museum and Gajah Gallery
2009	Being:	Ahmad Zakii Anwar	Malaysia	NUS Museum and Gajah Gallery
2009	Spacing Identities	J Ariadhitya Pramuhendra	Indonesia	NUS Museum and Gajah Gallery
2010	Masriadi Diary 2010	Nyoman Masriadi	Indonesia	Gajah Gallery
2010	Jogja Psychedelia	Yunizar	Indonesia	Soemadja Gallery, Faculty of Art and Design, Bandung Institute of Technology and Gajah Gallery
2011	Nyoman Masriadi- Recent Works	Nyoman Masriadi	Indonesia	Paul Kasmin Gallery, New York and Gajah Gallery
2011	Those the Gods Love Grow Mightier	Teng Nee Cheong	Singapore	Gajah Gallery
2012	The Fountain of Lamneth	Group Exhibition-Badung Artist	Singapore	Gajah Gallery
2012	Art Stage 2012	Nyoman Masriadi, Yunizar, M.Irfan, Rudi Mantofani, Handwirnan Saputra, Ahmad Zakii Anwar	Gajah Gallery	
2012	India Art Fair 2012	Nyoman Masriadi, Yunizar, M. Irfan, Handwiriman Saputra, Aye Tjoe Christine	India	Okla, New Delhi, India
2012	Art Hong Kong	Nyoman Masriadi	Hong Kong	Hong Kong Convention Centre
2013	Art Stage Singapore	Nyoman Masriadi, Yunizar, Ashley Bickerton, Nam June Paik, Lotta de Beus and Teng Nee Cheong	Singapore	Marina Bay Sands
2013	Art 13	Nyoman Masriadi, Yunizar, Ashley Bickerton, Handiwirman Saputra	UK	Olympia, London, United Kingdom
2013	Art Basel Hong Kong	Nyoman Masriadi, Yunizar, Ay Tjoe Christine and Ashley Bickerton	Hong Kong	Hong Kong Convention and Exhibition Centre
2013	I Made Djirma – Logic of Ritual	I Made Djirma	Indonesia	Sangkring Art Space, Yogyakarta, Indonesia
2013	Jason Lim – Bukit Musings	Jason Lim	Singapore	Gajah Gallery
2013	Lokanat – Ground Zero	Nyoman Masriadi, Handiwirman Saputra, Putu Sutawijaya, Mangu Putra, Yunizar, Ai Wei Wei, Ashley Bickerton	Singapore	Gajah Gallery
2013	Seeing Paintings: Conversations Before The End Of History	Ay Tjoe Christine, Handiwirman Saputra, I Made Djirna, Jumaldi Alfi, Koesoema Affandi, M Irfan, Mangu Putra, Nyoman Masriadi, Putu Sutawijaya, Yunizar	Indonesia	Sangkring Art Space, Yogyakarta, Indonesia
2014	Art Stage Singapore	Abdi Setiawan, Ahmad Zakii Anwar, Ashley Bickerton, Gu Wenda, Li Jin, Qiu Deshu, Rudi Hendriatno, Ugo Untoro, Wang Tiande, Yunizar	Singapore	Marina Bay Sands
2014	Abstraction and Refinement: Contemporary Chinese Ink Paintings	Gu Gan, Qiu Deshu, Wang Tiande, Wei Ligang	Singapore	Gajah Gallery
2014	Junk Anthropologies	Ashley Bickerton	Singapore	Gajah Gallery
2014	Art Basel Hong Kong	Abdi Setiawan, Ahmad Zakii Anwar, Ashley Bickerton, Gu Gan, Gu Wenda, Qiu Deshu, Ugo Untoro, Wang Tiande, Wei Ligang, Yunizar	Hong Kong	Hong Kong Convention and Exhibition Centre
2014	Bazaar Art Jakarta	Ashley Bickerton, Gu Gan, Gu Wenda, Mangu Putra, Qiu Deshu, Rudi Hendriatno, Ugo Untoro, Wang Tiande, Wei Ligang, Yunizar	Indonesia	The Ritz Carlton Pacific Place Ballroom
2014	Tempus Fugit (Time Flies)	Jason Lim	Singapore	Gajah Gallery
2014	Intersections: Latin American and Southeast Asian Contemporary Art	Ahmad Zakii Anwar, Handiwirman Saputra, Putu Sutawijaya, Ugo Untoro, Yunizar, Adonis Flores, Douglas Arguelles, Ivan Capote, Yoan Capote and Maykel Linares	Indonesia	Sangkring Art Space, Yogyakarta
2014	Yunizar Solo Exhibition	Yunizar	Singapore	Gajah Gallery
2014	Trajectories	Ashley Bickerton, Ahmad Zakii Anwar, Mangu Putra, Yunizar, Yusra Martunus, Putu Sutawijaya, Jumaldi Alfi, Handiwirman Saputra and Ugo Untoro	Cuba	Gallery Habana
2014	Zheng Lu: Resurface	Zheng Lu	Singapore	Gajah Gallery
2015	Yogyakarta Art Lab Opening Show	Ahmad Zakii Anwar, Ashley Bickerton, I Made Djirna, Jason Lim, Ivan Capote, Kumari Nahappan, Mangu Putra, Sabri Idrus, Suzann Victor, Ugo Untoro, Jumaldi Alfi, Yunizar, Rudi Hedriatno and Abdi Setiawan	Singapore	Gajah Gallery
2015	Bermain Rasa	Yunizar and Ugo Untoro	Yogyakarta	Gajah Gallery
2015	Sabri Idrus Solo Exhibition	Sabri Idrus	Singapore	Gajah Gallery
2015	Gajah Gallery Grand Opening at Tanjong Pagar Distripark	Ashley Bickerton, Yunizar, Kumari Nahappan, Ugo Untoro, Li Jin, Yusra Martunus, Sabri Idrus, Ahmad Zakii Anwar, R.Yuki Agiardi, Teng Nee Cheong, Suzann Victor, Wei Ligang, Wang Tiande, Gu Wenda, Chua Ek Kay, Ho Ho Ying and Ng Joon Kiat	Singapore	Gajah Gallery
2016	Gajah Gallery 20th Anniversary	Ashley Bickerton, Li Jin, Yunizar, Kumari Nahappan, Vasan Sitthiket and Putu Sutawijaya	Singapore	Gajah Gallery
2016	Archaeology of the Present	Ashley Bickerton, Jason Lim, Yunizar, Suzann Victor, Yusra Martunus, S. Nandagopal, Kumari Nahappan, Rudi Hendriatno, Handiwirman Saputra, Ugo Untoro and Afdhal	Singapore	Gajah Gallery
2016	Erizal As: Re figuring Portraiture Solo Exhibition	Erizal As	Singapore	Gajah Gallery
2016	Galeri Petronas – Southeast Asian Show	Handiwirman Saputra, Yusra Martunus, Jumaldi Alfi, Rudi Mantofani, Yunizar, Ugo Untoro, Kumari Nahappan and Vasan Sitthiket	Singapore	Gajah Gallery and Galeri Petronas, Kuala Lumpur
2016	Gobardhan Ash: Famine and Empire Solo Exhibition	Gobardhan Ash	Singapore	Gajah Gallery
2016	Mangu Putra: Between History and Quotidian Solo Exhibition	Mangu Putra	Singapore	Gajah Gallery
2016	Semsar Siahaan Solo Exhibition	Semsar Siahaan	Yogyakarta	Gajah Gallery (Yogyakarta Art Lab)
2016	Wakidi: The Light Before Dusk Solo Exhibition	Wakidi	Singapore	Gajah Gallery
2016	Yunizar: The Garden In Eden	Yunizar	Singapore	Gajah Gallery
2017	Art Stage Singapore 2017	Ahmad Zakii Anwar, Ashley Bickerton, Erizal As, Jason Lim, Kumari Nahappan, Li Jin, Mangu Putra, Rudi Mantofani, Sabri Idrus, Semsar Siahaan, Suzann Victor, Wei Ligang, Yunizar	Singapore	Marina Bay Sands
2017	Art Fair Philippines 2017	Ahmad Zakii Anwar, Ashley Bickerton, Erizal As, Mangu Putra, Rudi Mantofani, Sabri Idrus, Suzann Victor, Yunizar	Philippines	The Link Carpark
2017	Art Basel Hong Kong 2017	Ahmad Zakii Anwar, Ashley Bickerton, Jason Lim, Kumari Nahappan, Li Jin, Mangu Putra, Rudi Mantofani, Sabri Idrus, Suzann Victor, Wei Ligang, Yunizar	Hong Kong	Convention and Exhibition Centre
2017	Supernatural	Chong Weixin, Jason Lim, Lavender Chang, Maxine Chionh, Melissa Tan, Robert Zhao, Ruben Pang, Zen Teh, Sarah Choo Jing, Warren Khong, Kumari Nahappan, Ng Joon Kiat, Suzann Victor, Ian Woo and Adeline Kueh	Yogyakarta	Gajah Gallery (Yogyakarta Art Lab)
2017	Matters and Manipulations	Sabri Idrus	Singapore	Gajah Gallery
2017	Thinking Ink: Improvisations on Cultural Criteria	Chua Ek Kay, Gu Gan, Gu Wenda, Wei Ligang	Singapore	Gajah Gallery
2017	Knowing Incompleteness	Agung Santosa, Fika Riasantika, Gusmen Heriadi, Iabadiou Piko, Nofria Doni Fitri, Ridho Rizki	Yogyakarta	Gajah Gallery (Yogyakarta Art Lab)
2017	Art Stage Jakarta 2017	Ashley Bickerton, Erizal As, Kumari Nahappan, Li Jin, Mangu Putra, Rudi Mantofani, Sabri Idrus, Semsar Siahaan, Suzann Victor, Wei Ligang, Yunizar	Jakarta	Grand Sheraton Jakarta, Indonesia
2017	The New Now	Benedict Yu, Charlotte Lim, Gabrielle Tolentino, Kayleigh Goh, Kuat Zhi Hooi, Leonard Wee, Wong Jia Yi	Singapore	Gajah Gallery
2017	Under The Shadow of the Banyan Tree	Jason Lim	Singapore	Gajah Gallery
2017	Gajah Open House	Ayu Arista Murti, Dery Pratama, Erizal As, Fika Ria Santika, Iabadio Piko, Loli Rusman, Suzann Victor, Rudi Mantofani, Yunizar	Yogyakarta	Gajah Gallery (Yogyakarta Art Lab)
2017	Semsar Siahaan: Art, Liberation	Semsar Siahaan	Singapore	Gajah Gallery

== Fairs and Projects ==
Gajah Gallery contributes to research into Southeast Asian art. The gallery consistently exhibits in various local and international art fairs such as Art Basel Hong Kong, Art Stage Singapore, Art Stage Jakarta, Art Fair Philippines, Art Fair Tokyo, India Art Fair (formerly known as the India Art Summit) and Art021 Shanghai. The artists that they represent not only gain valuable exposure, but the fairs serve as a platform through which ideas are exchanged and better ties are built with other exhibitors.

=== Publications ===
==== Commemorative postcard set ====
A set of 15 postcards were designed as a commemorative piece for the gallery's 15th year anniversary celebration. The set is a compilation of work by Ahmad Zakii Anwar, J. Ariadhitya Pramuhendra, Jumaldi Alfi, M. Irfan, Mangu Putra, Nyoman Masriadi, Rudi Mantofani, Teng Nee Cheong and Yunizar.

==== Nyoman Masriadi, Reconfiguring the Body ====
Nyoman Masriadi's work Reconfiguring the Body offers a review of Nyoman Masriadi's works, his life and inspirations – through the words of art critics, TK Sabapathy and Goenawan Mohamed. Masriadi is Southeast Asia's most well-received contemporary artist.

Nyoman Masriadi- Reconfiguring the Body Book Cover

The visual imagery and narratives in his paintings are derived from observation of social life. Reactive against formalism, his early works show him sparring with Western modernism in the guise of cubism but meshing it with caricature, the cutting street language Indonesians use and graffiti. The wit and humor embodied in his works are shaped by the computer game culture that he grew up with. He overdraws finished paintings with a marker.

==== Nee Cheong, Those The Gods Love Grow Mightier ====
Teng Nee Cheong's book Those the Gods Love Grow Mightier offers an insight on the life, works and thoughts of renowned Singaporean artist Teng Nee Cheong that span a period of 40 years. Art critic TK Sabapathy, art curators Low Sze Wee and Lindy Poh, as well as Jasdeep Sandhu, Suteja Neka and Teng Nee Cheong himself, have provided a commentary, uncovering the artist's works, as well as inspirations that have influenced him.

Nee Cheong's works encapsulate the influences of culture and traditions around Asia by using symbols of Balinese mythology, Hinduism, and Buddhism.

==== Seeing Paintings: Conversations Before the End of History ====
Seeing Paintings: Conversations Before the End of History highlights the development of painting in Indonesia over the past 70 years, from the late 30s – 40s to the late 90s – 2000, and the historical contributions by both artists and writers to painting in Indonesia. The artists included in the publication, such as Affandi, Oesman Effendi, Djoko Pekik, Lucia Hartini, Made Djirna, Mangu Putra and Yunizar, have contributed significantly to the field of history and are presented in a comparative framework. The publication shows the history of Indonesian art as a mode of discourse that consists of an intricate journey due to the process of acculturation and enculturation in the form of vocabulary, speech, criticism, polemics, writings, doctrine, bureaucracy, schools, social institutions, and so on.

==== Mangu Putra, Between History and Quotidian ====
Mangu Putra: Between History & the Quotidian introduces the artist's efforts to re-examine historic archival footage of the Dutch colonisation in Bali in the early to mid 1900s and to draw together visual and verbal narratives to stage an untold account of history. With essays from art historian Adrian Vickers and curator Jim Supangkat, the publication explores how Putra re-imagines historic scenes, changing the emphasis by placing the Balinese people at the center, and shifts his attention towards the degradation of the natural world and the neglect of those who made Indonesia, as part of a search for spiritual meaning.

==== Semsar Siahaan, Art, Liberation ====
Semsar Siahaan: Art, Liberation is the most extensive printed publication on the late Indonesian artist Semsar Siahaan – a seminal figure of the progressive movement in Indonesia, who tirelessly campaigned and used his art as a tool to advocate social justice. Art critics TK Sabapathy, Astri Wright and Aminudin TH Siregar discuss Siahaan's emergence and his art in relation to prevailing sociopolitical conditions. They propose perspectives for relooking at the often-overlooked artist, appraising him historically and projecting him with fresh impetus for critical attention, presently.
