= Siti Adiyati =

Indonesian artist

- Born: October 2, 1951 (age 74); Yogyakarta, Indonesia
- Education: Akademi Seni Rupa Indonesia (ASRI), Yogyakarta
- Known for: Installation art, painting
- Movement: Contemporary art, Indonesian New Art Movement

Siti Adiyati Subangun (born 2 October 1951), better known as Siti Adiyati, is an Indonesian contemporary artist, educator, writer, and activist. Her work explores issues of social inequality, environmental degradation, and bureaucratic corruption.

She is known as one of the founding members of the Indonesian New Art Movement (Indonesian: Gerakan Seni Rupa Baru) from 1975 to 1979. With Gerakan Seni Rupa Baru (GSRB), Siti Adiyati was part of an "academic rebellion" that pushed for the separation of Indonesian art from institutional bureaucracy.

Along with Nanik Mirna, Siti Adiyati was one of the few women artists involved with the GSRB, which mostly included young male artists from Bandung, Jakarta, and Yogyakarta.

== Education and personal life ==
Siti Adiyati was a student of the Akademi Seni Rupa Indonesia (ASRI) in Yogyakarta. Siti Adiyati was part of a growing opposition on campus that was against the curriculum's limited conceptions of fine art. Then, schools like ASRI and the Institut Teknologi Bandung (ITB) limited fine art to mediums such as painting and sculpture.

Siti Adiyati was accompanied by fellow ASRI students and artists like Hardi, Bonyong Munni Ardhie, Nanik Mirna, FX Harsono in her views. From 1972 to 1974, Siti Adiyati began exhibiting together with them under the name of Group of Five (Kelompok Lima) and Five Painters (Pelukis Lima). These five artists were part of the main groups calling for a renewal of ideas in Indonesian art, creating room for debate and discussion among ASRI students. The five organised a student study club on campus to introduce ideas beyond their academy's curriculum, inviting literary scholars, students, and other intellectuals from the Gadjah Mada University (UGM) in Yogyakarta. The five were also editors for the campus publication, Journal of Art (Jurnal Seni). Through such activities, the five circulated concepts from Western contemporary art on campus.

== Career ==
=== Black December (Desember Hitam), 1974 ===
In 1974, Siti Adiyati was involved in the Black December (Desember Hitam) student protest. She was one of the few female participants present.

During the second Grand Painting Exhibition of Jakarta (Pameran Besar Seni Lukis Indonesia) from 18 to 31 December 1974, Siti Adiyati and her peers exhibited mixed media works, collages, and other works that could not neatly be defined as painting. These artworks were judged as inappropriate at a national exhibition that sought to represent national artistic identity. Their works were instead dismissed as being artistically immature, overly reliant on foreign trends, and being art for art's sake, a judgement that incited the Black December protest.

During the exhibition's closing ceremony on 31 December 1974, a protest was staged by Siti Adiyati with the four other participating ASRI students along with nine participants from beyond ASRI. They first sent a funeral wreath to the awards ceremony with the statement "condolences on the death of Indonesian painting" ("Ikut berduka cita atas kematian seni lukis kita"), then attempted to hand out a jointly-written and signed Black December Statement before being forced out of the room. The statement was signed by other graduates, writers, poets, playwrights and actors, with the demonstration reflecting a wider cultural movement. For example, the fifth and final point of the statement outlined:

That which has hindered the development of Indonesian painting for far too long is the obsolete concepts that are still adhered to by the ‘establishment’, by entrepreneurs in culture, and already established artists. For the sake of saving Indonesian painting it is time to give our respects to this establishment, namely to bid farewell to those who were once engaged in the battle for cultural art.

The students' efforts were condemned as an attack on national culture. It further prompted the involvement of Ali Sadikin, then-Governor of Jakarta, as well as the Ministry of Education and Culture, which sent down a representative to investigate. These actions reflected the wider distrust of student activity beyond the campus that emerged during the New Order era. A committee was set up to interrogate the involved ASRI students, and Siti Adiyati received an academic penalty for her involvement.

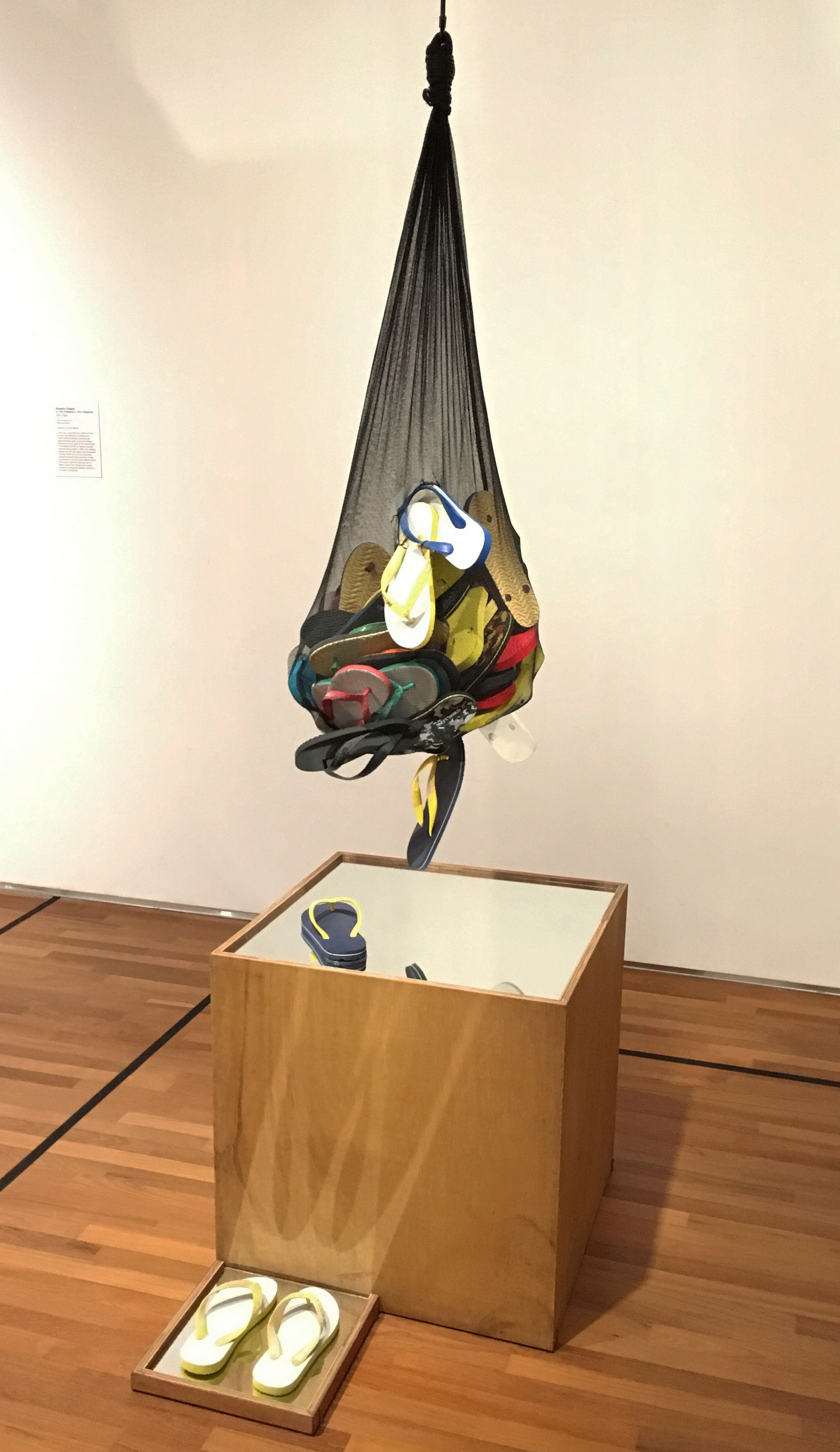
Siti Adiyati, Jejak (Footstep), 1976, remade 2015, Teak box, mirror, plastic netting and rubber slippers, Collection of the artist.

=== Gerakan Seni Rupa Baru (GSRB), 1975–79 ===
With the help of art critic Sanento Yuliman, Siti Adiyati and the ASRI cohort involved in Black December came together with ASRI graduate Martoyo Hartoyo and like-minded ITB students Bachtiar Zainul, Pandu Sudewo, Prayinto, and Jim Supangkat. Together, they organised what was initially called the Kelompok Seni Rupa Baru (New Art Group). They staged four exhibitions from August 1975 to October 1979, three of which took place at the Taman Ismail Marzuki Cultural Center (TIM).

They would not call themselves GSRB until their final exhibition in 1979, which was when the group also published their manifesto, Five Lines of Attack of the New Indonesian Art Movement (Lima Jurus Gebrakan Gerakan Seni Rupa Baru). After gaining and losing members, GSRB would consist of 28 individuals by the final exhibition.

== Art ==
=== Dolonan (Toys), 1977 ===
In her 1977 installation, Dolonan (Toys), Siti Ardyati takes from the iconography of wayang, often discussed as a court tradition and a form of 'high' culture. In contrast to courtly wayang kulit, which features lamb-skin leather puppets that are ornately painted on one side, Siti Adiyati's installation featured small wayang figures made of plastic, alongside other ornamental objects used as toys for children. These materials were hung from or attached to a standing cuboid structure made of four wooden planks and rows of white fabric attached around them. Such materials dissolved the boundaries of 'high' and 'low' culture, situating court traditions within the realm of the everyday. It revealed how tradition is not immune to commodification for mass consumption and tourist trade, with tradition often used in official constructions of national culture.

Siti Adiyati argued that the younger generation no longer related to the glorified past of Javanese court traditions, and that artists should engage with such histories in relation to their own experiences. Correspondingly, the work engages with the notion of 'tradition' by complicating its associations with 'high' culture, emphasising how wayang and its narratives have continually been represented and remediated through Indonesian popular culture, such comic books, cartoons, and television and radio.

=== Eceng Gondok Berbungan Emas (Water Hyacinth with Golden Roses), 1979 ===
First shown in Jakarta in 1979 for one of the Gerakan Seni Rupa Baru exhibitions at the Taman Ismail Marzuki, the installation Eceng Gondok Berbungan Emas (Water Hyacinth with Golden Roses) served as a critique of Suharto's New Order and the social inequalities that it produced. The only work in the exhibition that used a living organism, it featured a body of water with its surface covered by eceng gondok, a type of water hyacinth that is an invasive species to the Southeast Asian region, a floating aquatic weed with a high rate of reproduction. Rising above the water hyacinth were gold plastic roses, a contrast that sought to emphasise the New Order as "just an illusion symbolised by the golden rose in the sea of absolute poverty that the eceng gondok represents."

In the 70s, the socioeconomic divide in Indonesia had become increasingly pronounced, with the New Order's 1967 Foreign Investment Law bringing new business opportunities for the people and the military. The rose, for instance, was popular with upper-class Indonesians in Jakarta as an imported luxury good, with a single stalk equal in price to a kilogram of rice. Such would have been a significant amount of money for many of the poor in Jakarta who struggled to afford rice as a daily need. While roses served decorative purposes for the wealthy and powerful, the hyacinth could be transformed from a weed to be used as organic fertiliser and animal feed. This symbolised the durability and capacity of the Indonesian people in the face of Suharto's authoritarian New Order.

Eceng Gondok Berbungan Emas was recreated and shown at the Jakarta Biennale 2017, and also recreated as part of the travelling exhibition, Awakenings: Art in Society in Asia, 1960s–1990s, which was shown in 2019 at the National Museum of Modern Art, Tokyo (MOMAT), the National Museum of Modern and Contemporary Art, Korea (MMCA), and the National Gallery Singapore.
