= IGAK Murniasih =

Indonesian painter

I Gusti Ayu Kadek (IGAK) Murniasih (May 21, 1966 - January 11, 2006 (aged 39), also known as Murni, was a Balinese self-taught artist, and was one of the few Balinese women artists to have entered the mainstream Indonesian art scene. Her work is known for the depiction of disembodied bodies that transcend sexual violence, trauma and reclaim female sexuality. Murni's artworks have been exhibited and collected by galleries and museums including the National Gallery of Australia and the National Gallery of Singapore.

She died at the age 40 from cancer on January 11, 2006 in Ubud, Bali.

== Background ==
Murni was born in Tabanan, Bali in May 21, 1966, and was the tenth child of farmers. Her family later relocated to South Sulawesi as part of the Transmigration Program initiated by Dutch colonial powers. At the age of 9, she experienced sexual assault from her father and this experience would critically inform her artistic practice in the future.

At the age of 10, Murni moved to Makassar as a domestic helper for a Chinese-Indonesian family and relocated with the family to Jakarta. She returned to Bali in 1987, where she found work with a jeweler-silversmith.

Murni was married once and later divorced as her husband took a second wife for children. As women filing for divorce was seen as a defiance of the local traditional adat law in Bali, she was granted a divorce only when her husband later filed the case.

== Artistic career ==
Murni's artworks often feature simple and bold outlines on monochromatic backgrounds, which was an artistic style developed from her background in Pengosekan style, a traditional form of Balinese art painting.

Her artworks did not receive much recognition due to her education background until she was represented by a women-only gallery based called Seniwati Gallery that was based in Ubud, Bali. She was subsequently invited to participate in joint and solo exhibitions with Cemeti Art House, and Nadi Gallery in Indonesia, and internationally, including Hong Kong, Japan, Cambodia, Thailand, Spain, the United Kingdom, Germany, Italy and the Netherlands.

While Murni was considered a pioneer of feminist art in Bali, she did not harbour such political perspectives but sought to process the trauma inflicted on her as a victim of sexual assault.

== Art practices and styles ==
Murni's works were known for exploring sexuality and trauma through grotesque forms of sexual organs coloured in candy hues within clear outlines. At times, her paintings would depict sexual intercourse in variants and symbols, interpreted as the artist acknowledging her body as feminine, sexual, motherly yet marginalised. Despite the use of playful humour and cartoon-like simplicity, her works allowed the artist to transcend women's struggle from being a passive sexual object to an active sexual subject, as well as the paradox of sexual domination between male and female.

As noted by art historian Dr Wulan Dirgantoro, Murni's disembodied female bodies also explored the contemporary issues of gender politics and defied the normative gender roles in Indonesia. In the state-defined Five Duties of Women (Panca Dharma Wanita), womanhood was understood as centring on family and motherhood, and were restricted to the domestic sphere. Murni's work then existed outside the domestic realm was therefore able to challenge the imbalance of gender relations in Bali where female sexuality was not openly discussed.

Additionally, her works pointed to an almost narcissistic side of women's sexuality, with a desire to reclaim a body often raped or under the mercy of others' pleasures. Murni hence sought to reclaim her body for herself through an apparent 'copulating with each of her own organs', in an attempt to transcend her pain of a being a sexual assault victim.

== Reception of her works ==
With recurring visual images of monstrous feminine figures such as a toothed vagina and medusa-like objects appearing in her works, Murni's artworks have been described in impressions of absurdity, violence to the point of being 'dirty', 'perverse', and 'immoral'. On the other hand, they were also considered to be a depiction of the vicissitudes of life and challenge to male gaze rather than mere sex. More importantly, Murni's subject matter has brought to the fore what was otherwise often considered a private domain, allowing discussions on the female body and desire within the Indonesian visual art field.

Her works have been widely exhibited in or acquired by renowned institutions such as the Carnegie Museum of Art, the National Gallery of Australia, the National Gallery of Singapore, the Museum of Modern and Contemporary Art in Nusantara (MACAN), and the University of Chicago, and by private collectors.

== Exhibitions and art shows ==
Murni's works have appeared in numerous group exhibitions in Indonesia and overseas since 1995 and posthumously. These include the Taipei Biennial 2023 Small World and 2005 Bali Biennale, as well as two group exhibitions Deep inside my heart and Contemporary Worlds: Indonesia held in National Gallery of Australia in 2019 and 2023 respectively. Gajah Gallery also held three solo exhibitions of Murni in 2019, 2021, and 2022.

=== Selected Solo Exhibitions ===
| Year | Exhibition/art gallery | Venue |
|---|---|---|
| 1995 | Seniwati Gallery of Art by Women | Ubud, Bali |
| 1998 | Nokia Gallery/ Fringe Club | Hong Kong |
| 1999 | Galleria Estro | Padova, Italy |
| 2000 | Perjuangan Murni (Murni’s Struggle/ True Battle)/ Cemeti Art House | Yogyakarta, Indonesia |
| 2000 | Nadi Gallery | Jakarta, Indonesia |
| 2001 | Internet Gallery | Japan |
| 2002 | Numthong Gallery | Bangkok, Thailand |
| 2003 | CP Open Biennale | Jakarta, Indonesia |
| 2005 | Bali Biennale | Denpasar, Indonesia |
| 2019 | I Gusti Ayu Kadek Murniasih: On Beginnings/ Gajah Gallery | Yogyakarta, Indonesia |
| 2021 | I Gusti Ayu Kadek Murniasih: Shards Of My Dreams That Remain In My Consciousness,/ Gajah Gallery | Singapore |
| 2022 | I Gusti Ayu Kadek Murniasih: I See Myself Floating/ Gajah Gallery | Jakarta, Indonesia |
| 2023 | Taipei Biennial 2023 Small World | Taipei |

=== Selected Group Exhibitions ===
| Year | Exhibition/art gallery | Venue |
|---|---|---|
| 1998 | Group Exhibition/ Rudana Museum, Mas. | Ubud, Bali |
| 1999 | Group Exhibition of the SENIWATI/ Nusantara Rain Forest, Vegal Park | Walarode, Germany |
| 2000 | Group Exhibition of the SENIWATI/ Gallery Cipta II, Taman Ismail Marzuki | Jakarta, Indonesia |
| 2001 | Group Show/ Sky Door Art Place, Doyama | Tokyo, Japan |
| 2002 | Group Show/ Belvedere, 140 Hill Street | Singapore |
| 2008 | Murni and Mondo's joint exhibition/ Italian Institute | Jakarta, Indonesia |
| 2016 | Afterwork/ Para Site gallery | Kuala Lumpur, Malaysia |
| 2018 | Medium @ Play/ Gajah Gallery | Yogyakarta, Indonesia |
| 2019 | Contemporary Worlds: Indonesia/ National Gallery of Australia | Canberra, Australia |
| 2022 | 58th Carnegie International/ Carnegie Museum of Art | Pittsburgh, Pennsylvania, USA |
| 2023 | Deep inside my heart/ National Gallery of Australia | Canberra, Australia |
