= Sujana =

Sujana is an given name of Sanskrit origin. Notable people with the name include:

- Sujana Chowdary (born 1961), Indian politician
- Sujana Bai, 18th-century ruler of Thanjavur Maratha kingdom
- Sudjana Kerton (1922 – 1994), Indonesian painter
- Raden Mas Sujana, birth name of Hamengkubuwono I (1717 – 1792)

== Other uses ==
- Kompyang Sujana Stadium
