= Ashley Bickerton =

Artist (1959–2022)

- Born: May 26, 1959; Barbados
- Died: November 30, 2022 (aged 63); Bali, Indonesia
- Education: California Institute of the Arts; Whitney Museum Independent Study Program
- Known for: Contemporary Art

Ashley Bickerton (May 26, 1959 – November 30, 2022) was a Barbadian-born American contemporary artist. A mixed-media artist, Bickerton often combined photographic and painterly elements with industrial and found object assemblages. He is associated with the early 1980s art movement Neo-Geo, which included artists like Jeff Koons, Peter Halley, and Mayer Vaisman.

== Life ==
Born in Barbados on May 26, 1959, Bickerton was the son of Derek Bickerton, a linguist and scholar of Creole and pidgin languages. His father's research work caused his family to move around the globe every several years. As a child Ashley Bickerton lived in a number of countries across four continents. The family finally settled in Hawaii in 1972. British by birth, Bickerton became a naturalized U.S. citizen in the mid-1980s. He spent 12 years in New York City, where he established his career before finally settling on the island of Bali in 1993.

Bickerton died from complications of amyotrophic lateral sclerosis on November 30, 2022, at the age of 63.

== Career ==
Bickerton graduated from the California Institute of the Arts in 1982, then moved to New York City to attend the Whitney Museum Independent Study Program. After exhibiting for a few years in New York, he was included in a four-person show at the Sonnabend Gallery in 1986, that included Jeff Koons, Peter Halley, and Meyer Vaisman. In 2004 The New Museum exhibited "East Village USA," a show that featured "Neo-Geo" artists including Bickerton. In 2009 he was included in Pop Life: Art in a Material World, at the Tate Modern in London. The following year he was exhibited in Collecting Biennials at the Whitney Museum of American Art, which acted as a counterpoint to the 2010 Biennial and paid homage to the previous 80 years of Whitney Biennials. He had solo exhibitions at Various Small Fires in Los Angeles (2021), Lehman Maupin Gallery (2006, 2008, 2011), Sonnabend Gallery, (2000, 2004, 2006), both in New York, and White Cube in London (2001, 2009).

Over the last twenty-five years of his life, Bickerton exhibited his work internationally and was included in public art and museum collections. His works are held in the collections of the Museum of Modern Art; the Tate; the Fondation Cartier pour l'Art Contemporain, Paris; the Stedelijk Museum, Amsterdam; Berardo Collection Museum in Lisbon, Portugal; the Museum of Contemporary Art, Chicago; and the Whitney Museum of American Art, New York.

In April 2014, Bickerton held his first solo exhibition at Gajah Gallery. The month-long exhibition, "Junk Anthropologies", marked a new direction for the American master of philosophical funk, where he re-established himself as a master painter in the grand tradition. The focus of the works is about the ongoing corruption of Bali that he witnessed being a resident there, with the styles greatly influenced by Paul Gauguin, for whom he held a perennial obsession.

From April to August 2017, Bickerton had his first UK retrospective at Newport Street Gallery in London. Entitled "Ornamental Hysteria" and spanning more than three decades of the artist's career, the exhibition presented 51 works, many of which were new and previously unexhibited pieces. Amongst the featured works was Canoe, Shark, Woman (2016), a sculpture created in Yogyakarta Art Lab, which The Guardian described as "[having] the look of the ritual artefact of Bickerton’s tropical island obsession, creating a power object or fetish (as islanders do) with found objects (fish, flowers, beads) that is the more hypnotic for its solemn parody – silver vestal offering a hammerhead shark, coconuts in her Indonesian canoe".

In 2022, Bickerton had two solo shows in New York. His show at Lehmann Maupin gallery, titled Seascapes at the End of History, includes art objects from his Ocean Chunk series that were first conceived while living in New York City prior to his relocation to the Indonesian island of Bali in 1993. This exhibition was curated by 56 Henry gallery founder Ellie Rines and a second show at Jamian Juliano-Villani's gallery was at O'Flaherty's on Avenue C. The press release was written by the contemporary artist Jordan Wolfson.

== Work ==
Bickerton's work explores issues in contemporary art related to the commodification of the art object itself. Often his objects are grotesque in a self-aware manner and are often a critique on capitalism.

=== Early constructions ===
In the 1980s, Bickerton made a series of works which resembled packing cases and crates, covered with corporate logos. His early work is noted for its display of corporate logos and constructions titled as either "Self-Portraits," "Commercial pieces," or "Anthropospheres." They are typically Assemblages of technological or industrial materials with the inclusion of found elements and screen printed iconographic images. These seemingly functional objects without clear purpose are often covered in various logos, technological signage, and codes. His artwork "Abstract Painting for People 4" made in 1987 is now included in the collection of François Pinault (since 2007).

=== Singapore Tyler Print Institute ===
The mixed-media pieces he made in collaboration with the Singapore Tyler Print Institute are "spooky" images of green-skinned creatures emerging from a sea littered with cans and bottles.

=== Collaboration with Yogyakarta Art Lab ===
Bickerton’s most recent project was a collaboration with the Yogyakarta Art Lab (YAL). YAL is Gajah Gallery’s major initiative based in Yogyakarta - Indonesia’s up-and-coming art hub - co-founded in April 2012 by Indonesian artist Yunizar and owner of Gajah Gallery Jasdeep Sandhu. This collaboration involved Bickerton creating series of sculptures which examined what he liked to think of as the "mitochondrial eve". Originally derived from clay models the artist created in his Bali studio, they were reinvented in Jogjakarta in a variety of archival materials centered on cast aluminum. These then new works now coming out of YAL have been described by Jasdeep Sandhu as "Some of the more important contemporary sculpture produced in the past 10 years".

=== Later works ===
Green Head with Inlay 1, 2007

Bickerton continued to develop work within his established themes and iconography of tropical surrealism, green-headed characters, and assemblages. His work in 2006 and 2007 took the form of large-format digital prints and paintings with thick wooden frame constructions with various inlays. These elements can be seen in "Made's Warung" 2006 and "Green Head with Inlay 1" (2007).

2014 marked the start of a new series of Silver Ladies, which are manifested in a double portrait of two identical subjects, beautiful young Balinese women, nude except for a floral sash around their hips and coronas of tropical flowers. Their bare skin and dreadlocked hair are painted shiny silver, their lips in vivid colours. The first work in this series is a painting titled 2 C (A)W E2 P.G. 2 T(B) W. The model for both figures is the artist’s Balinese wife, Cherry Saraswati Bickerton, as quoted from the catalogue "Junk Anthropologies" - Ashley Bickerton written by Jamie James and published by Gajah Gallery.
