= Freddy Sofian =

Indonesian artist

- Born: Freddy Sofian; 10 December 1948; Bandung, Indonesia
- Died: 12 June 2018 (aged 69); Bandung, Indonesia
- Education: Rangga Djempol Studio (1970–1975)
- Notable work: "The Lion Dance" (2000), "Abstract Bandung" (2002), "Silver Landscape" (2015), "Unity" (2015)
- Movement: Indonesian New Art Movement
- Patrons: Barli Sasmitawinata

Freddy Sofian (10 December 1948 – 12 June 2018) was an Indonesian artist.

== Brief biography ==
In 1970–1975, he studied at the Rangga Djempol Studio under the guidance of Barli Sasmitawinata. In the years 1993–1995, he studied in Europe (Netherlands, (Germany), France). Since 1998, he worked in the studio "Red Point" (Bandung).

== Work ==
Among the most notable works are "The Lion Dance" (2000), "Abstract Bandung" (2002), "Silver Landscape" (2015), "Unity" (2015). In addition to abstract paintings he is known also as a master of graphics.

He had six solo exhibitions: in 1994 (Ubud, Bali), 1998 (Kuala Lumpur, Malaysia), 1999 (Jakarta), 2000 (Bandung), 2002 (Jakarta), 2013 (Bandung). Besides, he took part in more than 30 group exhibitions in Indonesia, Holland, Malaysia, USA, South Korea, Singapore.

In 1979, he participated in the cult exhibition of the movement Gerakan Seni Rupa Baru (Indonesian New Art Movement), presenting a composition of broken chairs. On 17 June 2005, he became a signatory of the "Abstract Manifesto" declaration on 17 June 2005, a movement that annually held its exhibitions in Jakarta. In 1996–2000, he took part in the International Festival of Arts in Ipoh (Malaysia), in 2016 – in Langkawi Art Biennale.
