= Fendry Ekel =

Fendry Ekel (born 1971, Jakarta) is a painter based in Berlin and Yogyakarta. Ekel's works have been displayed Internationally: the Netherlands, France, Belgium, Spain, Mexico, Italy, Turkey, Czech Republic, Singapore, South Africa, the United Kingdom, Germany, Australia and the United States.

== Biography ==
Fendry Ekel migrated in the 80's with his family from Indonesia to Europe. He studied in Amsterdam (1992 - 1997) at Gerrit Rietveld Academie and (1998 - 1999) at Rijksakademie van Beeldende Kunsten where he met painters Narcisse Tordoir, Luc Tuymans and Michelangelo Pistoletto as mentors. In 1999 Fendry Ekel was an Artist in Residence at Cittadellarte, Fondazione Pistoletto in Biella, Italy.

Fendry Ekel's migration as teenager from Indonesia to Europe was a radical move that has given rise to a continuing fascination for investigating his surroundings. Architecture and the urban landscape is a perfect setting where abstraction and figuration meet each other in reality. It is in this setting that Ekel preferably locates the subjects of his paintings. Fendry Ekel's paintings explore the shadow side of human ambition. In his art practice Ekel is intrigued by the power of cliche, producing images intended to create an unguarded moment in seeing when cliches are twisted into an unexpected new awareness and a kind of simultaneous Déjà vu. His large-scale, layered works are often based on black and white photographs depicting portraits, architecture, monuments or other remnants of historic events. By appropriating these images from our collective memory, Ekel critically investigates the use of art, architecture and figuration as propaganda for ideology, confronting himself during the creative process with borderlines where ethical and aesthetic values intersect.

In 2013 Fendry Ekel initiated a series of works entitled 'Investigation' paintings. In this series Ekel unveils layers of forgotten and untold stories, exploring the most elementary motives behind the human desire to create myths of their own time.

Fendry Ekel returned to Indonesia with a perspective shaped by his experiences overseas and an interest in memory, history, and artistic representation. Having lived in the Netherlands since the age of 14, when his family emigrated from Indonesia, Ekel develops artworks and institutional projects that examine the relationship between identity, historical narratives, and systems of influence. While his studio practice is primarily centred on works on paper, his institutional practice as co-founder of the artist initiative Office for Contemporary Art (OFCA) International in Yogyakarta focuses on organizational structures and professional networks. By working as both an artist and organizer, Ekel examines the relationship between artistic production and the institutional contexts in which artworks are presented and interpreted.

One example is *Young Gropius As Soldier* (2007), which revisits the public image of Walter Gropius by introducing references to his military service and raising questions about the construction of historical narratives. Following its completion, the work was presented through exhibitions and publications associated with OFCA International. This process of circulation forms part of the work's conceptual framework, drawing attention to the role of exhibitions, publications, and institutional networks in shaping the interpretation and reception of artworks. Through this approach, Ekel addresses questions of identity, participation, and belonging within the contemporary art world.

== See also ==
- I Nyoman Masriadi
