= Hardi (artist) =

Indonesian artist (1951–2023)

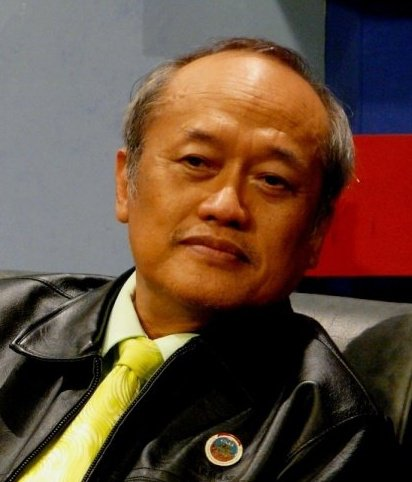
- Born: R. Soehardi; 26 May 1951; Blitar, East Java, Indonesia
- Died: 28 December 2023 (aged 72)
- Education: Academy of Fine Arts of Indonesia (Yogyakarta) (1971–1974), Academy of Jan van Eyck (Maastricht) (1975–1977)
- Movement: New Art Movement
- Awards: Award of the Indonesian government "Permata" (2002)

Hardi (26 May 1951 – 28 December 2023) was an Indonesian visual artist who was a member of the New Art Movement (Indonesian: Gerakan Seni Rupa Baru).

== Biography ==
From 1971 to 1974 he studied at the Academy of Fine Arts of Indonesia in Yogyakarta, and from 1975 to 1977 at the Jan van Eyck Academie in Maastricht (Netherlands). His first solo exhibition (1976) was also held there. He was one of the founders of the Cultural Forum of Jakarta (Indonesian: Formja, Sept. 2015). His first three paintings were sold in 1970 to a small shop owned by a certain Neka, who later turned into one of the largest art dealers in Indonesia.

Hardi died on 28 December 2023, at the age of 72.

== Creativity ==
His first pictures reflected social protest in accordance with the ideas of the New Art Movement of which he was a member. In 1978, he was arrested for a photo collage depicting the artist in a general form with the title "President of 2001. Suhardi". But soon he was released with the help of the Vice-President Adam Malik, an art lover.

Later he became an adherent of expressionism. There are numerous portrait works made by the artist (for example, the portrait of Raden Saleh or the president Joko Widodo) and paintings on mythological subjects.

Hardi was also a master of making krises.

Hardi held 16 personal exhibitions in different countries. Beginning in 2009, he was an active member of the working committee of the Congress of Culture of Indonesia. The artist's paintings are kept in the museums of Jakarta and Bali, and in private collections. On 17–26 June 2011 in Jakarta there was held his personal retrospective exhibition "Art and Politics" in connection with the artist's 60th birthday.

The artist's works are of acute social character.

Some of his works served as the basis for the cover designs of several books published in Russia.

== Awards ==
- Award of the Indonesian government "Permata" (2002)
