= Dede Eri Supria =

Indonesian Social Realist painter

Dede Eri Supria is an Indonesian Social Realist painter. Born in Jakarta on January 29, 1956, he studied in SSRI Yoga.

His works often include scenes of struggle of the poor in urban centers.

== Awards ==
- General Award for The Arts from The Society For American Indonesia Friendship Inc. (1978)
- The International Visitor's Program from USIS, USA (1981)
- Anugerah Adam Malik (1986)
- Affandi Award (1993)
