= Han Woerdman =

Dutch physicist (1942–2020)

Johannes Petrus "Han" Woerdman (29 November 1942 – 18 August 2020) was a Dutch physicist. He was a researcher at Philips Natuurkundig Laboratorium and later professor at Leiden University.

== Life ==
Woerdman was born on 29 November 1942 in Laren, North Holland. In 1968 he started working at Philips Natuurkundig Laboratorium. He obtained his PhD in mathematics at the University of Amsterdam in 1971 under Andries Rinse Miedema with a thesis titled: Some optical and electrical properties of a laser-generated free-carrier plasma in Si. In 1983 he left Philips and was appointed professor of experimental physics at Leiden University.

At Leiden University Woerdman performed research into lasers and optics, specializing in classical optics. He was responsible for building the field of quantum optics at the university. In 2020 one of the articles he contributed to in 1992 was chosen as one of three classics of Physical Review A.

Woerdman was elected a member of the Royal Netherlands Academy of Arts and Sciences in 2002. In 2007 he was named a Fellow of the European Optical Society. In 2010 he was diagnosed with Parkinson's disease, which caused his death on 18 August 2020 at the age of 77.
