= Han Meijer =

Dutch academic

Henricus Eduard Hubertus (Han) Meijer (born 15 May 1949 in Amsterdam) is a Dutch professor emeritus of Polymer Technology in the Eindhoven University of Technology; he was formerly the scientific director of the laboratory. His research interests include structure development during flow and structure-property relations, micro-rheology and microfluidics, micro-macro-mechanics, modelling of polymer processing and design in polymers.

== Career ==
He received his MSc in mechanical engineering from the University of Twente in 1975, and his Ph.D degree from the same university in 1980. His thesis, "Melting in Single Screw Extruders: Models, Calculations, Screw Design", was done under the direction of J.F. Ingen Housz. He then became a research scientist at DSM research. In 1985 he was appointed part-time professor at the department of Polymer Chemistry and Technology at Eindhoven, and in 1989 became full professor in Polymer Technology in the Fundamental Mechanics group of the department of Mechanical Engineering.

He was scientific director of Eindhoven Polymer Laboratories from 2003 until his retirement on 1 May 2014. He was the PhD thesis advisor for more than 60 students, and published over 200 peer-reviewed scientific articles.

Meijer was awarded the DSM Performance Materials Award 2010.
