= Tjokorda Krishna Putra Sudharsana =

Indonesian artist

Tjokorda Krishna Putra Sudharsana (born 1956) is a Balinese artist and the current prince of Ubud.
