= Sarah Choo Jing =

Photographer

Sarah Choo Jing (Chinese: 朱婧; pinyin: Zhū Jìng; born 1990) is a Singaporean multidisciplinary fine artist who works with photography, video and installation. Her works often feature isolated moments in contemporary life and explores the flâneur's observations, voyeurism and the uncanny.

== Background and family ==
Choo was born in Singapore, the older of two children. Her father works in the freight industry and her mother is an administrative manager. She has one younger brother, Mathias, who is pursuing film-making at Nanyang Technological University.

During her second year in Nanyang Junior College, Choo was offered a full scholarship to read art at Goldsmiths, University of London. However, she had to turn down the offer due to her parents’ disapproval. Choo attended the Nanyang Technological University; School of Art, Design and Media where she graduated in 2013 with a Bachelor of Fine Arts in Photography and Digital Imaging, First Class Honours. Following that, she completed her master's degree in Fine Art Media at the University College London Slade School of Fine Art in 2015.

== Career ==
Choo has done numerous solo and group exhibitions throughout her career. Choo also taught at the Nanyang Girls’ High School Art Elective Programme between 2016 and 2020 and is currently the Head of Department for Aesthetics at Raffles Institution.

=== The Art of The Rehearsal (2017) ===
In 2017, the three-channel video installation The Art of The Rehearsal was commissioned by the National Museum of Singapore and was the first permanent showcase of Gallery10, the museum's then newly opened space. The work was done in collaboration with Shanghai-based commercial cinematographer Jeffrey Ang. The videos depict nine traditional dancers from different cultures rehearsing against a collage of notable ethnic districts in Singapore – Little India, Kampong Glam and Chinatown. Funded by the National Arts Council, the installation cost between S$200,000 and S$250,000 and featured dancers from local dance troupes, namely the Singapore Hokkien Huay Kuan Dance Theatre, Apsaras Art and Era Dance Theatre.

At Personal Structures, an exhibition organised by the European Cultural Centre and held at the Palazzo Bembo as a fringe programme of the 57th Venice Biennale, Choo presented another version of The Art of The Rehearsal. As the Venice exhibition space was approximately ten times smaller than in the National Museum of Singapore, Choo modified the installation such that viewers could go up close to the dancing figures, creating a sense that they were miniature models of a larger work.

== Notable works and exhibitions ==
- Accelerated Intimacy (2018) – A solo exhibition held during the annual Singapore Art Week, Accelerated Intimacy presents a series of events that are incomplete, escalating and present. A 5-channel immersive video installation – which has decontextualised conversations intercut with lines from notable films – is projected in a space that is transformed to mimic a hotel room. Additionally, photos and props from the video installation are put on display to create a “lived” experience.
- Singapore: Inside Out (2017) – The Sydney edition of the exhibition features two of Choo's multimedia installations. Waiting for the Elevator (2014) portrays routine actions of persons at the void decks of public housing flats in Singapore to examine the social value of these environments while Puddles in the City (2014) feature metropolitan street performers when they are not performing.
- Consecutive Breaths (2016) – The video loop features various footages taken at over 80 Mass Transit Railway stations in Hong Kong and explores ideas related to waiting and the slowing down of time. The artwork was also featured in the 2018 edition of Loop Barcelona.
- Wear You All Night (2016) – The split screen video installation showcases a slice of life of a woman and a man in their private space. While the characters live together, they are isolated, resorting to using objects as a form of communication. The exhibitions highlights the urban isolation observed in metropolitan cities and the viewer takes on the role of a voyeur, observing the events from a window frame. This work was also featured at Loop Barcelona in 2017.
- From Across the Road (2015) – Held at the Maurice Einhardt Neu Gallery in London, the solo exhibition explores themes related to surveillance and voyeurism. The exhibition features three series – Waiting for the Elevator (2014), Puddles in the City (2014) and It was a Tuesday like any other Tuesday (2014). A copy of Choo's journal where she notes down her thought process was also put on display.
- Photo London (2015) - Choo's work was exhibited at the first Photo London photography fair at Somerset House since its hiatus in 2007. The exhibition featured her video work titled It was a Tuesday like any other Tuesday (2014) which includes multiple photographs taken over a night from her window in London, creating a voyeuristic perspective.
- Cinema Total (2014) – Choo's The Hidden Dimension II (2013) and It was a Tuesday like any other Tuesday (2014) were screened as part of the Berlinale programme hosted by the Collegium Hungaricum Berlin.
- Singapore Art Week (2014) – Represented by gallerist Vera Wijaya of Galerie Sogan & Art, Choo sold all five editions of her photography during the art fair to a Singapore-based buyer at S$6,500 per edition.
- The Hidden Dimension II (2013) – The multimedia installation features seven family members engaging in personal activities, played on repeat. The artwork examines modern isolation and loneliness despite living in a highly populated country. Despite sharing the same space, the family members do not interact with one another. The viewer takes on the role of the voyeur as they observe these private, lone moments. The piece was exhibited in the Learning Gallery of the Singapore Art Museum in 2015.

== Awards ==
In January 2014, Choo won the 4th Edition of the ICON de Martell Cordon Bleu – a S$30,000 award that acknowledges exceptional photographers in Singapore, launched by Martell. Choo was also awarded the Highly Commended Award in the 2007 United Overseas Bank Painting of the Year Competition.
