= Richard Winkler =

Swedish painter and sculptor

- Born: 26 June 1969 (age 57); Norrköping, Sweden
- Education: Nyckelviken School of Arts, Stockholm; Beckmans School of Design, Stockholm
- Known for: Painting; Sculpture

Richard Winkler (born 26 June 1969) is a Swedish painter and sculptor.

== Biography ==
Artist Richard Winkler was born in 1969 in Norrköping, Sweden. He studied graphic design and illustration at Beckman's School of Design in Stockholm. For several years, he worked as an illustrator for advertising agencies and magazines. In 1997, he moved to Bali, Indonesia, where he currently lives with his wife and two daughters and now works as a full-time artist.

Richard specializes in contemporary art that often features vibrant colors and light tones. His works commonly include rotund figures set against bright backgrounds, which appear in settings ranging from enigmatic landscapes to intricate floral scenes. These elements are influenced by his experiences living in Bali. Winkler has explored different techniques for representing the human form. This exploration has led to the development of a unique, expressive style. He is often associated with depictions of cylindrical human figures and vivid rice paddies set in Balinese landscapes.

== Collection ==
Bali has had an important influence on Winkler's work. His earlier paintings were focused on the abstract lines and curves of the human body, in particular the exaggerated curves of the limbs. After his move to Bali in 1997, these became more and more human-like. In 2009, Richard had his 9th solo exhibition at ARTSingapore, where critics called Richard and his work the "star of the show."

Winkler has also created three-dimensional bronzes. These artworks were exhibited for the first time at Art Bazaar Jakarta in August 2009.

== Gallery ==
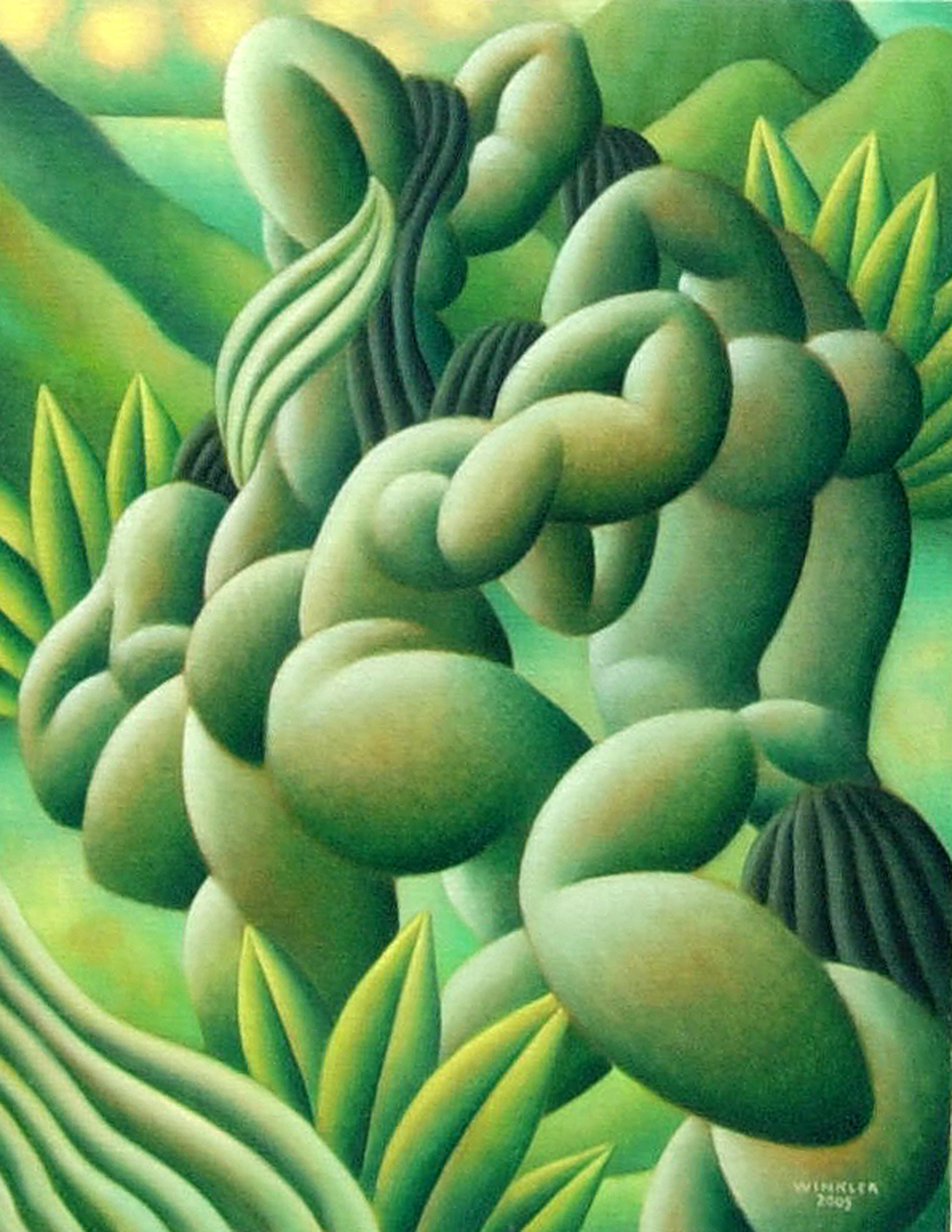
Bathers' Dance, 2005

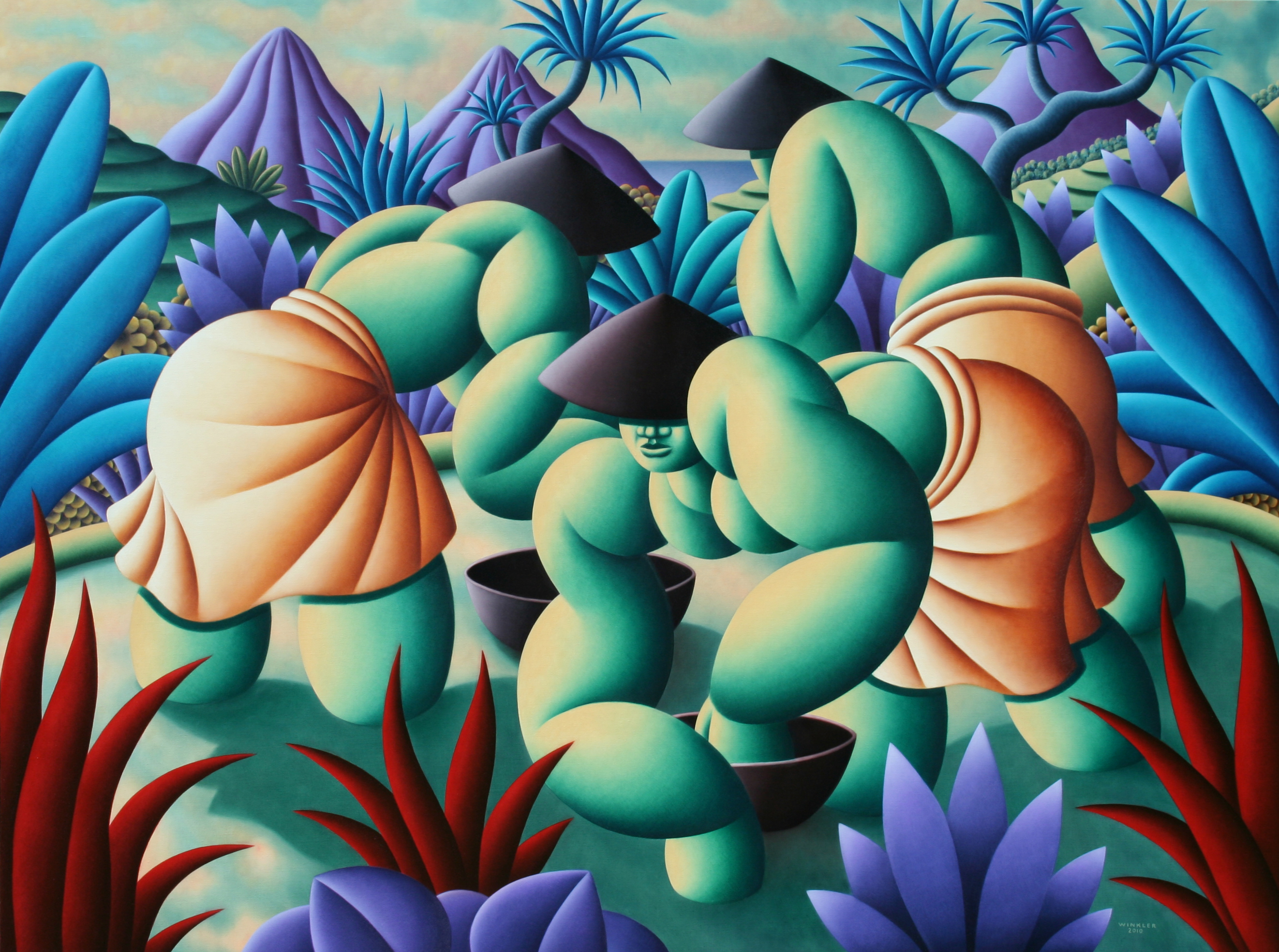
Farmers of the Blue Hills, 2010

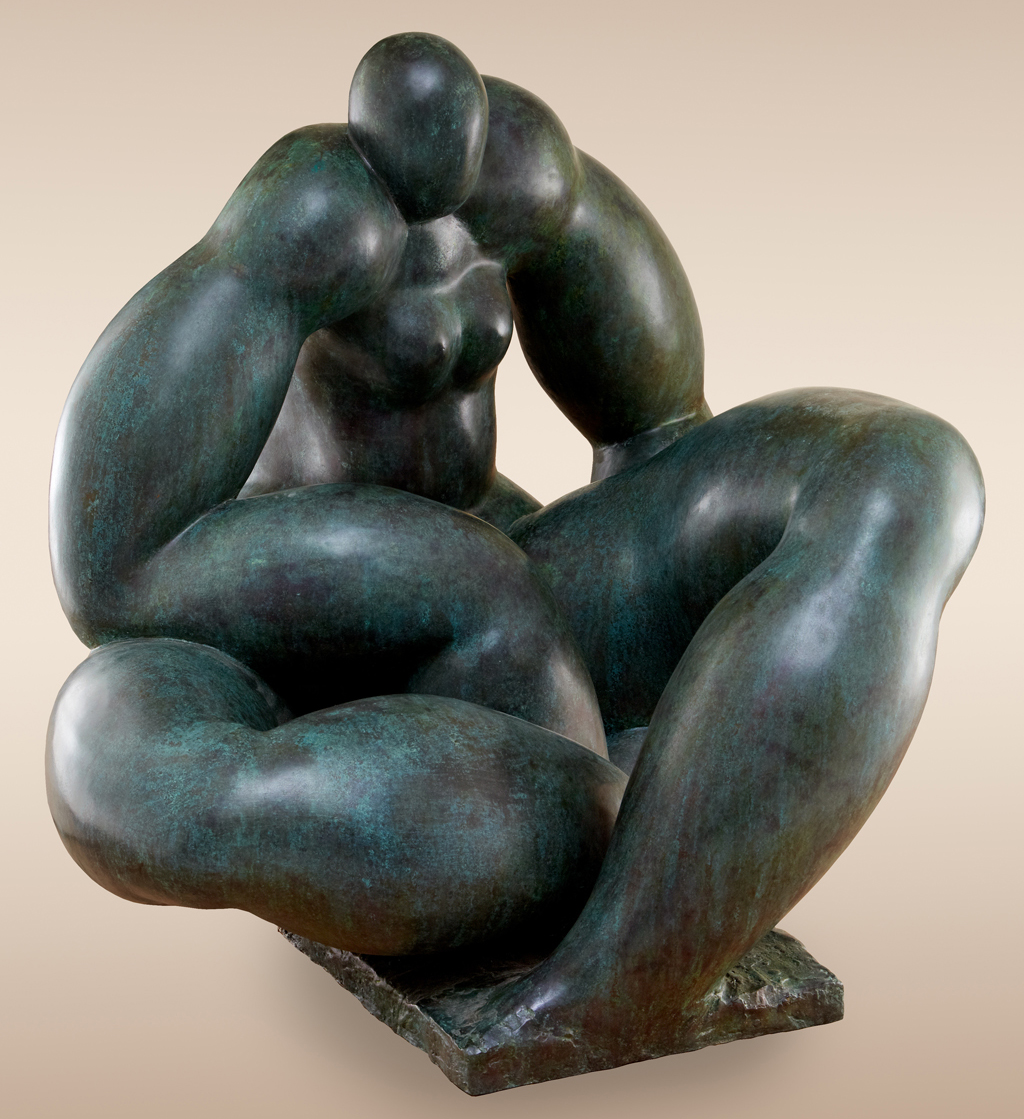
Large Figure Sitting Down, 2009

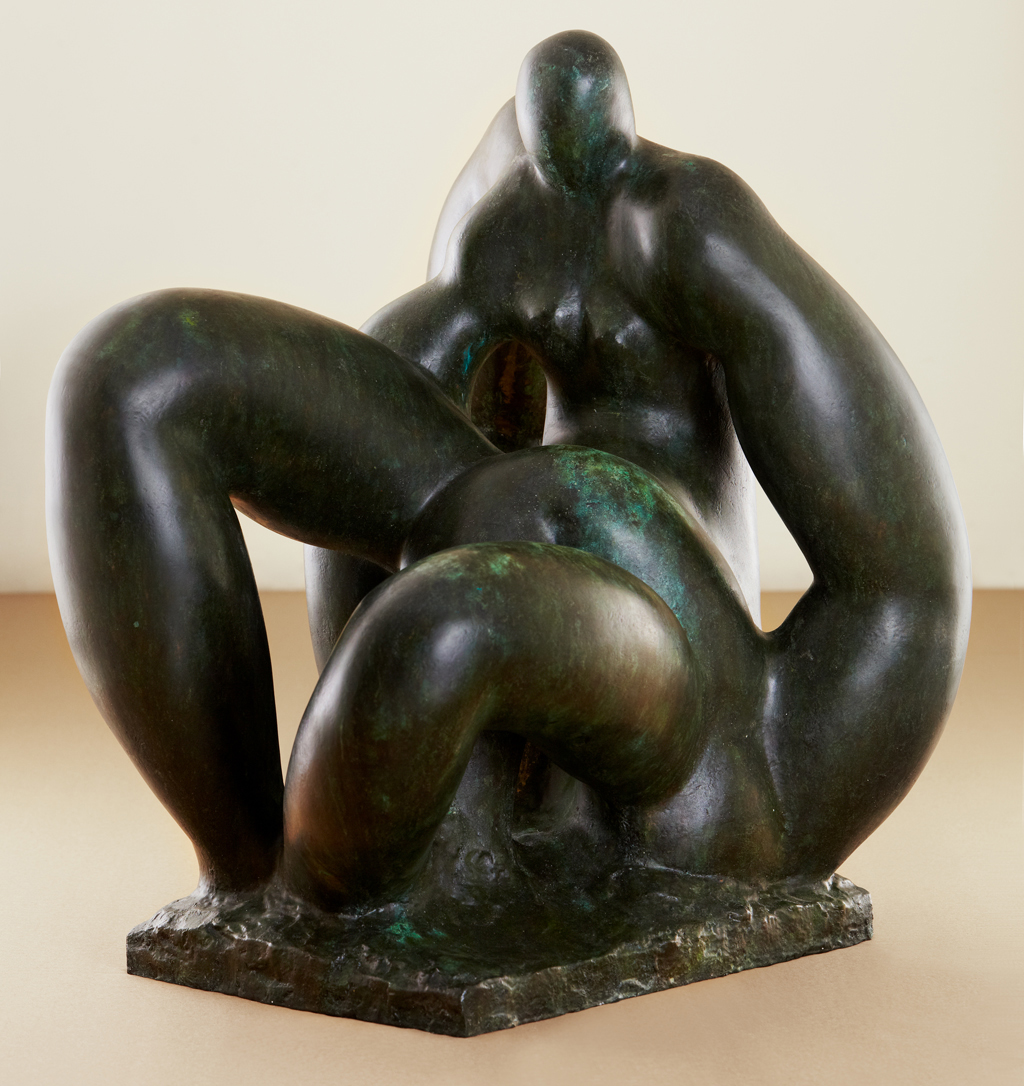
Seated Figure, 2009

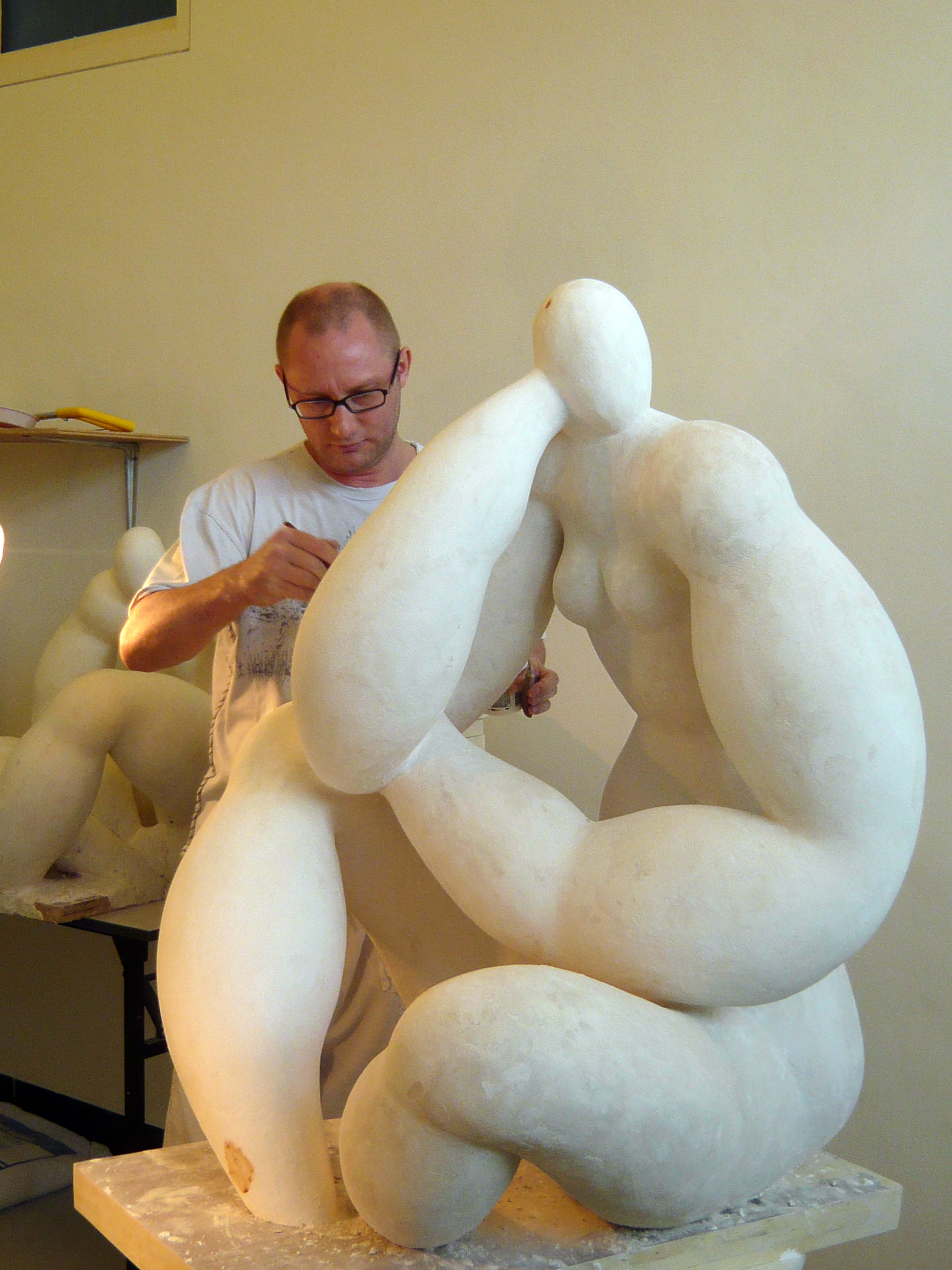
A Dream in the Garden work in progress, 2009

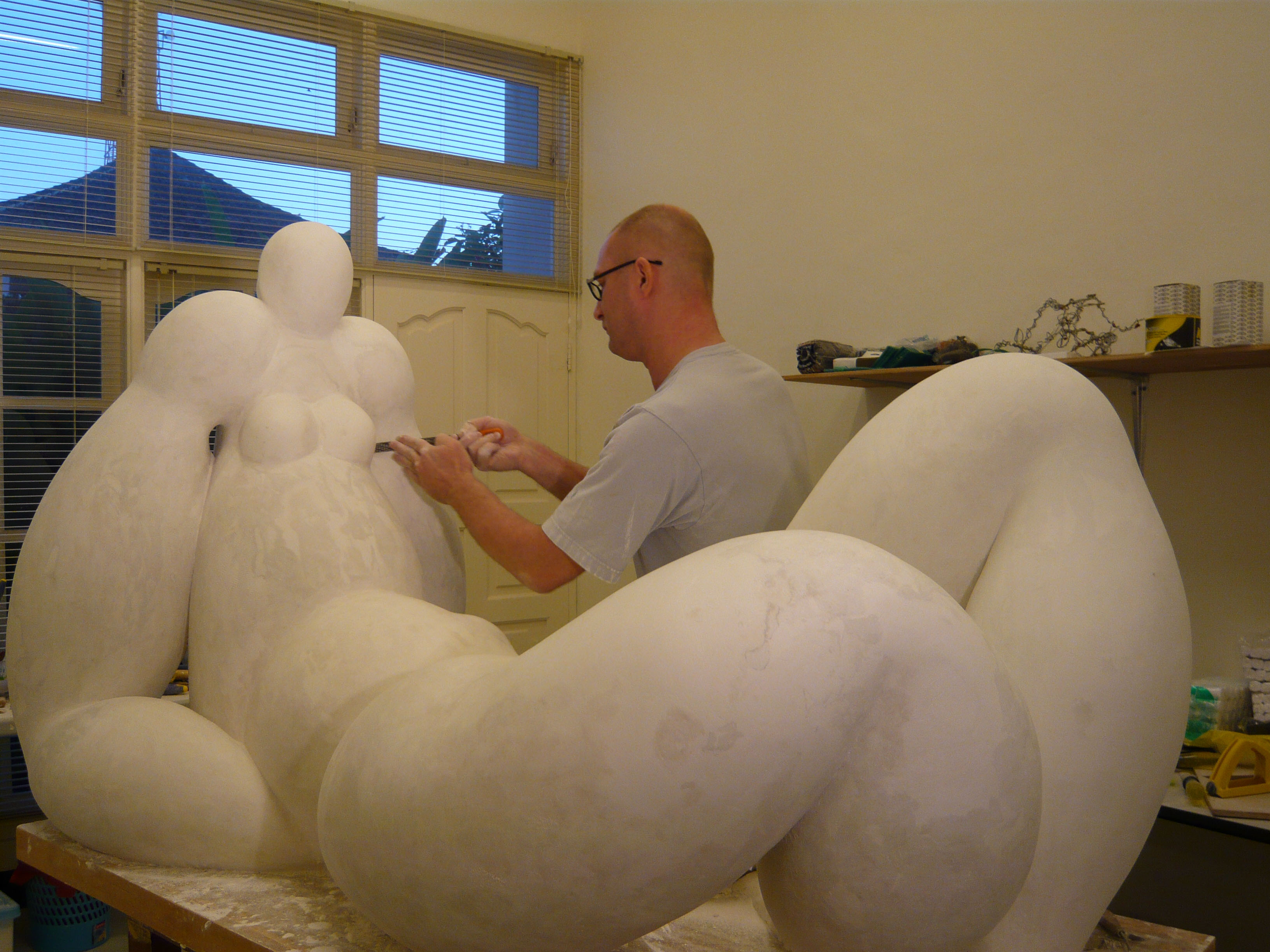
Pregnant Woman work in progress, 2009
