= Ivan Sagita =

Indonesian artist

Ivan Sagita was born in Malang 1957 and studied at the Indonesian Art Institute in Yogyakarta from 1979 to 1985. He is known as an introvert and mysterious artist, but his work of art is well known in the world of art.

== Style ==
He uses realistic painting techniques to make unrealistic images. Out of this tension, he strives to depict the uncertainties of everyday life, especially as they impact on those who are powerless in the face of poverty and injustice. He has said: "To me, life always goes differently than we expect to. This is why I tend to express uncertainties. Seeing the life in my surroundings I get the impression that everybody is controlled by an invisible power..." Sagita's subjects are frequently the traditional Javanese people whose life struggles he observed in Yogyakarta. He has noted: "They struggle to survive, but they accept whatever happens to them." In preparation for a painting, he may take multiple photographs of a subject in an attempt to capture their inner reality. He almost always paints human figures repeatedly within one work, depicting them in shifting poses or different situations.

== Career ==
Sagita's paintings were selected as the Best Work at the 7th and 8th Jakarta Biennales of Painting in 1987 and 1989, and he was awarded the silver medal at the Osaka Triennale in 1996. His first solo exhibition was at the Duta Fine Art Gallery in Jakarta in 1988. Selected group exhibitions include: The Third Asian Art Show (Fukuoka Art Museum, Japan, 1989); The Seventh Asian International Art Exhibition (Bandung, Indonesia, 1992); The First Asia-Pacific Triennial of Contemporary Art (Queensland Art Gallery, Brisbane, Australia, 1993); The Asian Water Color (National Gallery, Bangkok, 1995); and Modernity and Beyond (Singapore Art Museum, 1996).

=== Selected solo exhibitions ===
2003

- Red Mill Gallery, Vermont Studio Centre, US.

2000

- "Freezing The Time", Drawing Exhibition, Gallery of Northern Territory University, Darwin, Australia.

2005

- "Death Containing Life", CP ARTSPACE, Jakarta

=== Selected group exhibitions ===
1998

- “Under Cover” The Pretoria Art Museum and Ipopeng Project, Pretoria, South Africa
- Sandton Civic Gallery, Johannesburg

1999

- “Soul Ties” Art from Indonesia, Singapore Art Museum

2000

- “Gambar Ajal dan Kegirangan Baru”, Eddie Hara & Ivan Sagita, Gallery Santi, Jakarta

2001

- “Membaca Frida Kahlo”, Nadi Gallery, Jakarta
- Osaka Triennale 2001, Japan
- “Not just the political”, Museum II, Widayat, Mungkid, Magelang
- “Melik Nggendhong Lali” Anniversary Basis 50, Bentara Budaya, Yogyakarta
- “Pembacaan lewat simbol-simbol”, Galery Embun, Yogyakarta

2002

- Anniversary Exhibition Gallery Canna, Jakarta
- “Mata Hati Demokrasi”, Taman Budaya, Jakarta
- “Dimensi Raden Saleh”, Gallery Semarang, Semarang
- “Saksi Mata”, Nadi Gallery, Jakarta
- “Intercosmolimagination”, Studio Budaya Langgeng - Magelang

2003

- “Lintas Batas, Andi Galeri, Jakarta
- Canna Galeri
- Galeri Gajah Mada, Semarang
- CP Open Biennale 2003, Jakarta, Indonesia
- “Air kata-kata – Sindhunata”, Bentara Budaya - Yogyakarta
- “Infatuated”, Sunjin Gallery, Singapore

2004

- “Membaca Dunia Widayat”, Museum Widayat - Magelang
- “Wings of Words Wings of Color”, Langgeng Gallery - Magelang
- “All is in our head”, Singapore Art air 2004
- “Perception in Vibration”, Edwin’s Gallery - Jakarta
- “4 Sehat Mo-limo Sempurna”, Bentara Budaya - Yogyakarta

2005

- “Urban/Culture”, CP Biennale 2005
- “The Second Beijing International Art Biennale”, China 2005

2006

- “Time & Signs”, Vanessa Art Link, Jakarta
- “Beyond: The Limits and Its Challenges”, Biennale Jakarta XII
- “China International Gallery Exposition”, Beijing – China
- “ Common Link” Vanessa Art Link – Beijing
- “Icon Restropective” Visual Art exhibition, Jogja Galery – Yogyakarta

2007

- “Beautiful Death” Bentara Budaya Yogyakarta
- “Gendakan” – Bentara Budaya – Yogyakarta
- “ 100 Tahun Pelukis Besar Affandi” Taman Budaya Yogyakarta
- “ Conscience Celebrate”, Edwin’s Gallery, Jakarta
- “Transgenerasi”, Galeri Nasional – Manado
- “Titian Masa”, The Collection of National Gallery of Indonesia – Malaysia
- “Shanghai Art Fair 2007” : Shanghai – China
- “Neo-Nation” Biennale Jogja IX – 2007 – Yogyakarta

== Awards ==
- 1987: Award Biennale Seni Lukis Jakarta – Indonesia
- 1989: Award Biennale Seni Lukis Jakarta – Indonesia
- 1996: Silver Medal, The Osaka Triennale 1996. Japan
- 1998: Mainichi Broadcasting System Prize, The Osaka Sculpture, Triennale 1998,

== Sources ==
- https://web.archive.org/web/20090530030808/http://www.legacy-project.org/index.php?page=artist_detail&artistID=177
- http://cp-foundation.org/past/ivansagita_bio.html
- http://adhi.smugmug.com/gallery/3410320_iGSrz/1/190875842_B57Ci#190875842_B57Ci-A-LB
