= Soewardja =

Indonesian painter

Soewardja (also spelled Suwardja, born 1900) was a successful Indonesian artist in the first half of the twentieth century, who specialized in watercolor paintings that captured the romantic depictions of the Dutch East Indies as the main themes; mostly natural scenes of mountains, rice paddies and villages, with scenes of natives.

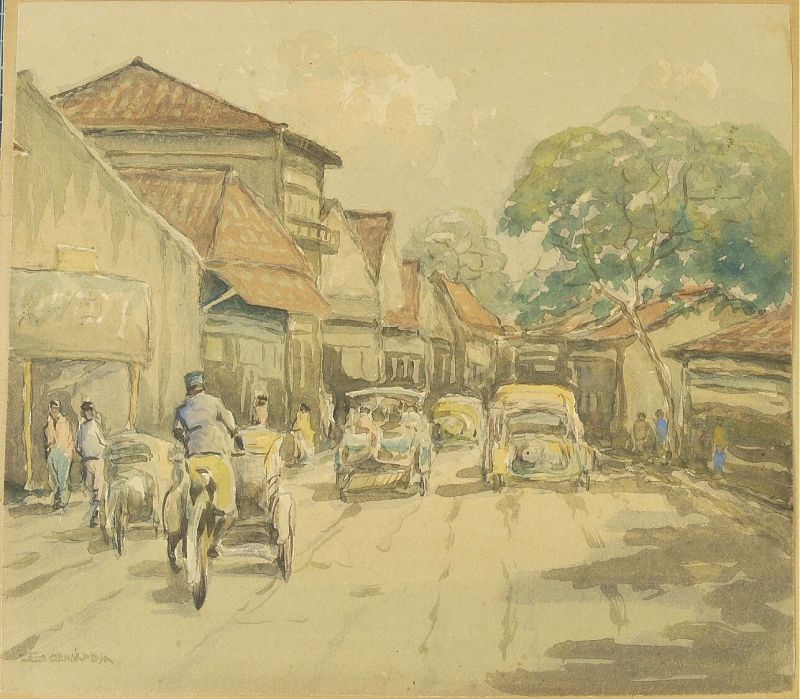
Street scene with cars and beja's, c. 1950

== Life ==
Soewardja was born in Bandung on the island of Java in the Dutch East Indies (present-day Indonesia) and grew up among an artistic environment. His brothers Basar and Adiwinata were both also artist painter by profession. Soewardja moved to Batavia where he soon became an accomplished painter and was highly appreciated by the Dutch colonial citizens. However, his work was sometimes criticised by nationalistic artists as following the Mooi Indie style (Dutch for "Beautiful Indies"). The term became famous in 1939 after prominent painter Sindoedarsono Soedjojono used it to mock painters that merely depict the romantic, naturalistic landscapes of the Dutch East Indies. The Tropenmuseum in Amsterdam has a number of Soewardja's works in its permanent collection.
