= Hasan Djaafar =

Indonesian painter

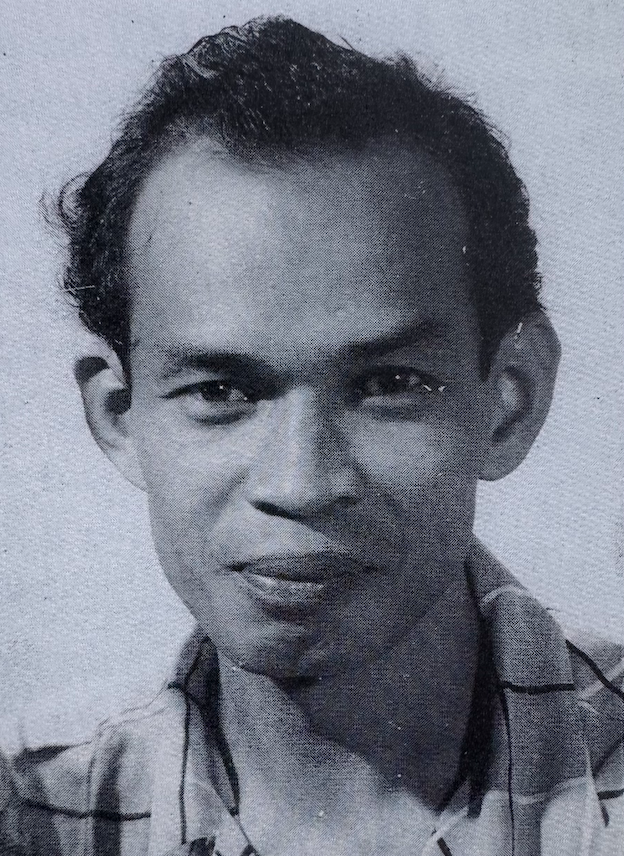
- Hasan Djaafar in 1950
- Born: 1919; Koto Gadang, West Sumatra, Dutch East Indies
- Died: 1995 (aged 75–76)
- Occupation: Painter
- Movement: Expressionism

Hasan Djaafar (1919–1995) was an Indonesian painter based in Jakarta, Indonesia. He is known for his Impressionist and Expressionist oil paintings which typically depict the people, architecture, landscapes, and daily life activities of his homeland. His style synthesized modernist European oil techniques and expressionist stylization with traditional Indonesian subject matter.

Over his forty-year career, he frequently exhibited internationally at the invitation of government officials from nations such as the United States, the Netherlands, West Germany, Brazil, Singapore, and Japan.

== Early life ==
Hasan Djaafar was born in Koto Gadang, West Sumatra. His artistic abilities were identified during childhood and his initial art instruction came from Wakidi, one of the earliest Indonesian painters to adopt oil painting techniques. Though he initially worked as a clerk in a print shop, Djaafar traveled to Paris in 1949, where he met Salim and a circle of international artists experimenting with abstract art. This trip ultimately influenced his decision to become a full-time painter.

== Career ==
Djaafar became a full-time painter in 1951, and by 1957 he had become well known as a European-style painter within Indonesia. He put on an exhibition of forty paintings at the Hotel de Boer in Medan, which was covered in the local Dutch newspaper Het Nieuwsblad voor Sumatra.

In 1959, Djaafar displayed about 100 paintings at Singapore Polytechnic during a solo exhibition put on by the Singapore Art Society. The opening of this solo exhibit was attended by Singapore's Minister for Culture S. Rajaratnam, Deputy Prime Minister Toh Chin Chye, and Indonesian Consul-General Brigadier-General G.P.H. Djatikoesoemo. Two exhibition catalogs from this Singapore show are kept in the permanent collection of the National Museum of Singapore. During this trip, he met Basuki Abdullah, who was living in Singapore at the time.

In 1961, Djaafar put on his first exhibition in Jakarta which was inaugurated by the US Ambassador to Indonesia, Howard P. Jones. After the success of the show, Ambassador Jones extended a formal invitation to Djaafar to visit the United States through the Foreign Specialist Program of the Bureau of Educational and Cultural Affairs of the U.S. Department of State. He exhibited in Washington, DC and New York City.

The following year, Djaafar traveled to Rio de Janeiro for two months in 1963. Towards the end of this trip, an exhibit was organized at the Palácio da Cultura of the Brazilian Ministry of Education and Culture. He displayed 50 works which had been painted during his time in Rio de Janeiro.

These international travels culminated in 1964 when the Goethe Institute invited Djaafar to exhibit in Jakarta again, this time displaying 45 paintings that depicted scenes from his travels around the world. During this show, he sold almost every painting to international collectors. After this show, he took a seven-year break from international travel to focus on his wife and nine children.

His next international exhibit was in 1971 at the Indonesian Embassy in the Hague, at the invitation of the Dutch and German governments. He worked in the studio of Gaby Warris-Lijnkamp, a Dutch painter that Djaafar met in Indonesia. Lijnkamp did an interview with Het Rotterdamsch Parool in which she described Djaafar as "the Karel Appel of Indonesia." He stayed in the Netherlands for three months. In August 1971, he put on an exhibit at the Indonesian Embassy in The Hague where he displayed 95 paintings, and then put on a second exhibit in Hamburg where he displayed 40 paintings and 50 drawings.

The following year, in 1972, a representative of Philips in Indonesia invited Djaafar to exhibit at the Philips building in Jakarta. The opening of this exhibit was attended by 800 guests and got coverage in local Jakarta television. Philips then invited Djaafar and his wife to their headquarters in Eindhoven, where he put on an exhibit in 1974.

The Vice President of Indonesia, Adam Malik, inaugurated his 1977 show in Jakarta and bought four paintings for his own private collection. Paintings from Malik's extensive art collection were published in a catalogue two years later.

His favorite international trip, according to his interview with Nusantara Museum, was to Japan in 1979. He and his wife traveled through Japan for forty days. He put on a successful exhibit in Tokyo, including the sale of ten paintings to one collector.

In 1991, the Nusantara Museum in Delft, Netherlands put on a solo exhibition of Djaafar's work. The museum published a book to accompany the exhibit, entitled, "Hasan Djaafar: Schilder uit Sumatera, Indonesië," which was written by Anne Kloosterboer and includes a foreword by museum director Daniëlle Lokin.

== Style and technique ==
Self Portrait (1967)

Djaafar's style reflects Impressionist and Expressionist themes, though he never classified himself as belonging to any specific category of style. His painting techniques included the bold use of contrasting color, often painting unmixed colors with a palette knife or straight from the paint tube. By the late 1950s, his focus was on depicting the energetic atmosphere of his subject rather than true-to-life detailed accuracy.

When German art critics in the Braunschweiger Zeitung wrote about Djaafar in 1965, they described his style as "penetrating, wild, hard... one could even say, daring brush strokes," as quoted in the Nusantara Museum book.

When asked about his style in an interview with De Telegraaf during the 1991 Nusantara exhibition, Djaafar said: "Let people judge that for themselves."

== Legacy ==
Hasan Djaafar's paintings were collected by Sukarno and Adam Malik. Djaafar considered himself a cultural ambassador of Indonesia and exhibited his work in embassies and public centers around the world, often at the invitation of and funded by foreign governments including the United States, the Netherlands, West Germany, Brazil, Singapore, and Japan.

Djaafar viewed his career as an effort to develop international friendliness. In a 1977 interview with The Straits Times, he said, "I believe I have been successful in bringing the people of the country I visit and Indonesians together through art." Djaafar's legacy as a painter is contextualized by the immense political change that Indonesia experienced as it gained independence from Dutch colonization after the four-year Indonesian War of Independence and began to participate in the international community.

Djaafar died in 1995. His paintings continue to appear regularly on the international auction market, with works held in private collections across Europe, Asia, and the Americas.
