= Han T. Dinh =

Han T. Dinh is director of vehicle engineering for the United States Postal Service.

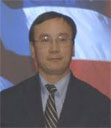
Han Dinh

He was the winner of the 2006 White House, Closing the Circle Award in Transportation from President George W. Bush. In 2006, he was selected by Public Works magazine as one of the 50 Trendsetters of the Year.

He received his masters of science in mechanical engineering from the University of Wisconsin at Madison and completed his doctoral study program at George Washington University.

From 1982 to 1988, he was a senior project engineer at General Motors Corporation in Detroit, Michigan.

From 1988 to 2006, he worked with the US Department of Energy and natural gas industry to convert more than 7,500 vehicles from the United States Postal Service to compressed natural gas, the largest natural gas vehicle fleet in the United States.

In 2005, he directed the United States Postal Service effort to acquire ethanol vehicles and utilize biodiesel in the heavy duty vehicle fleet.

In 2006, he launched what is called the first conversion of a mail delivery van into a hybrid electric vehicle.

Based on his work in alternative fuels, he was selected among the hundreds of participants as the first winner of the 2006 White House, Closing the Circle Award in Transportation.

In the same year, he was selected by the Public Works magazine as one of the 50 Trendsetters of the year. President George W. Bush and Vice President Al Gore were also selected as the other trendsetters.

His work has been widely published by the Society of Automotive Engineers (SAE) and American Society of Mechanical Engineers (ASME).

== Awards ==
- The 1993 Federal Energy Efficiency, Renewables and Water Conservation Award from US Department of Energy.
- The 1995 Closing the Circle Certificate of Achievement for Environmental Excellence in Government
- The 1996 General Service Administration Award for the Use of Alternative Fuels and Energy Conservation
- The 2006 White House, Closing the Circle Award on Alternative Fuels and Transportation
