= Sudjana Kerton =

Indonesian painter (1922–1994)

Sudjana Kerton (22 November 1922 – April 1994) was an Indonesian painter. Born at Bandung in the midst of political transition of the country from the Dutch colonial era to the independent republic of Indonesia, Kerton's paintings exhibited the revolutionary era of Indonesia. He was an artist of a generation that was globally aware, politically active, and intensely involved with aesthetic and formal questions. Kerton is recognized as one of Indonesia’s most original and controversial artists.

== Biography ==
As a young man, Kerton had many interactions with both Indonesians and Dutch residents. After Indonesian independence, Kerton joined with other artists working with the new national government of Sukarno, and became an artistic journalist. His drawings documented the Indonesian independence efforts on the battlefield, at the negotiation table, and in secret underground meetings.

During the Indonesia revolution period, Kerton's ideology went along with the anti-Dutch movements that he had to move from Jakarta to Yogyakarta. Through his sketches and drawings, he immortalized several important historical events, including the sovereignty transfer from the Dutch to Indonesia in 1949. His fierce sense of nationalism carried over into his work, and many of his paintings convey a sense of pride in his country.

In the early 1950s, Kerton studied art and life in very different cultures in Europe, including the Netherlands and France. He also visited Mexico, where he studied the role of artists during the Mexican revolution. Kerton studied at the Art Student League at New York City, where he learned from Yasuo Kuniyoshi and Harry Sternberg. Kerton’s woodcut entitled Homeward was chosen by the UNICEF for their Christmas card in 1964. The woodcut depicts a family returning home from a daily work at the fields.

Kerton settled in the New York City, married, and raised a family. He returned to Indonesia in 1976. Everyday life in Indonesia became his constant theme, in which he put tones to bold colors and vivid scenery.

== See also ==
- I Nyoman Masriadi
