= Nyoman Masriadi =

Indonesian Contemporary Artist

I Nyoman Masriadi (born 1973) is a painter and a leading artist of the post-Suharto era in Indonesia. His works have gained a collectors base which includes prominent collectors in and around the region.

== Biography ==
Masriadi was born 1973, in Gianyar, Bali. Masriadi received his training in art at the Indonesian Institute of the Arts, Yogyakarta (ISI).

=== Work ===
In Bali, where he was born, there were two traditions of painting: a sacred one and one of words for a Western audience. However, his relationship to these is indirect. Masriadi received his training in art at the Institute Seni Indonesia (ISI) Yogyakarta. From the time he was an art student, he had already been recognized by peers as one of the first contemporary Balinese artists who eased himself away from an encompassing concern with Balinese life, culture and traditions in his works. He is reputed to have stood in front of the canvas on a cardboard box to restrict himself from any distractions and fidgety behavior, in order to learn the skill of painting.

The imagery and narratives in his paintings are based on observations of social life and behavior. His work incorporates elements of cubism, caricature, street advertising, and graffiti. In some works, he uses a marker over finished paintings, a technique related to his engagement with artistic traditions.

"Masriadi: Black Is My Last Weapon" was the artist's maiden solo show at the Singapore Art Museum which was co organised by Gajah Gallery in 2008. The exhibit spanned Masriadi's 10-year career and explored the evolution of his signature black-skinned figures, a motif now widely copied by other Indonesian painters.

=== Awards and accolades ===
He was awarded the prize for Best Painting at the Dies Natalis ISI Yogyakarta in 1997. He has participated in group exhibitions in Australia and the Netherlands, and in Indonesia: in Bali, Singapore, Jakarta, Mungkid (Magelang), Solo, Surabaya and Yogyakarta.

Masriadi is one of Southeast Asia's most well-received contemporary artists at auction.

== Exhibitions ==
=== Selected solo exhibitions ===
Year	Exhibition	Venue/Represented By	Country
2011	Nyoman Masriadi – Recent Paintings	Paul Kasmin Gallery	New York
2011	Nyoman Masriadi – Recent Works	Gajah Gallery	Singapore
2008	Black is my last Weapon	Gajah Gallery / Singapore Art Museum	Singapore

=== Selected group exhibitions ===
Year	Exhibition	Venue/Represented By	Country
2012	India Art Fair (former India Art Summit)	Gajah Gallery	New Delhi-India
2012	Art Basel	-	Switzerland
2012	Art Stage	Gajah Gallery	Singapore
2011	Art Stage	Gajah Gallery	Singapore
2010	Art Paris + Guests	-	Paris-France
2010	New Directions	Museum of Contemporary Art Shanghai	China
2010	Art Basel Miami	-	USA
2009	In Rainbow	Esa Sampoerna Art House	Surabaya
2009	Jogja Biennale X	-	Jogja-Indonesia
2009	The Simple Art of Parody	Museum of Contemporary Art Taipeh (MoCA Taipei)	Taipei
2006	Expression of an Era	Garis Art Gallery	Padma Hotel Bali
2005	Beauty and Terror	Galerie Loft	Paris
2002	Not Just Political	H. Widayat Museum	Magelang
2002	Terumbu Karang, Exhibition and Auction	-	Jakarta
2002	Group Exhibition	One Gallery	Magelang-Central Java
2002	Terumbu Karang, Exhibition and Auction	-	Jakarta
2002	Age-hibition	Edwin's Gallery	Jakarta
2001	Kelompok 7	Benteng Vredeburg	Yogyakarta
2001	-	Museum of Modern Art	Moscow - Russia
2000	Seni Rupa Campur	Beeldende Kunst (CBK)	Dordrecht-Netherland
2000	Figur di Abad Baru	Edwin's Gallery	Jakarta
1999	Masa Kini	Artoteek Den Haag and Centrum Beekdende Kunst	Dordrecht-Netherlands
1999	Biennale VI	Purna Budaya	Yogyakarta
1999	Knalpot	Cemeti Art House	Yogyakarta
1999	Duet Exhibition with I GAK Murniasih	Cemeti Art House	Yogyakarta
1999	Group Exhibition with Mahendra Mangku & Nyoman Sujana	Komaneka	-
1998	Sanggar Dewata Indonesia Exhibition	Benteng Vredeburg	Yogyakarta
1997	Kelompok 7 Exhibition - Sanggar Dewata Indonesia	Bentara Budaya	Yogyakarta
1996	Young Artist II Exhibition	Benteng Vredeburg	Yogyakarta
1995	-	Dies Natalis Indonesian Art Institute	Yogyakarta
1994	Hitam Putih + Plus an exhibition of Kelompok Prasidha	Indonesian Art Institute	Gampingan-Yogyakarta

== Notable works ==
=== The Man From Bantul (The Final Round) ===
Sotheby's (Hong Kong): Final Price HK$7,82 million, or US$1,000,725. The sale of this work, a triptych conveying the resolve of the human spirit, marked a record for a contemporary Southeast Asian art piece at auction. It sold for about five times its estimated price.

=== Attack from Website ===
This painstakingly rendered commentary on the art world and art practices of the 21st century sold for US$935,844 at Christie's Hong Kong as a lot in their Asian 20th Century and Contemporary Art (Evening Sale) on May 25, 2013.

=== Fatman ===
At Christie's first auction in Shanghai, Masriadi's mixed-media piece Fatman, was sold for US$757,547, the highest price ever paid for a similar sized work of the artist.

=== Jago Kandang (Home Champion) ===
Sotheby's (Singapore): Final Price US$370,668.

Placed into the social and political context of Masriadi's home country of Indonesia, it however simultaneously conveys a deeper story as he captures both the spirit and psyche of today's society. The emotions that are demonstrated by the football fans in the background–on the far right, anger; elsewhere, cheering supporters waving the national flag and banners carrying the words "Indonesia"–are indicative of Masriadi's cultural sensitivity and sharp humour.

'Jago Kandang' is ranked No.1 in Sotheby's Top Ten Contemporary Southeast Asian Paintings according to C-Arts Asian Contemporary Arts and Culture Magazine, Vol.03 2008.

=== Jangan Tanya Saya Tanya Presiden (Don't Ask Me, Ask The President) ===
One painting by Indonesian artist Nyoman Masriadi was expected to sell for up to $25,000 (in 2007). In the end, a Southeast Asian collector paid SGD$360,000 (HK$1,854,000) for it, setting a world record price for a Masriadi painting.

== Publications ==
=== Nyoman Masriadi: Recent Paintings, April 7 - May 14, 2011 ===
Paul Kasmin Gallery catalog, presented in collaboration with Gajah Gallery. Essay by Benjamin Gennochio.

=== Nyoman Masriadi-Reconfiguring the Body ===
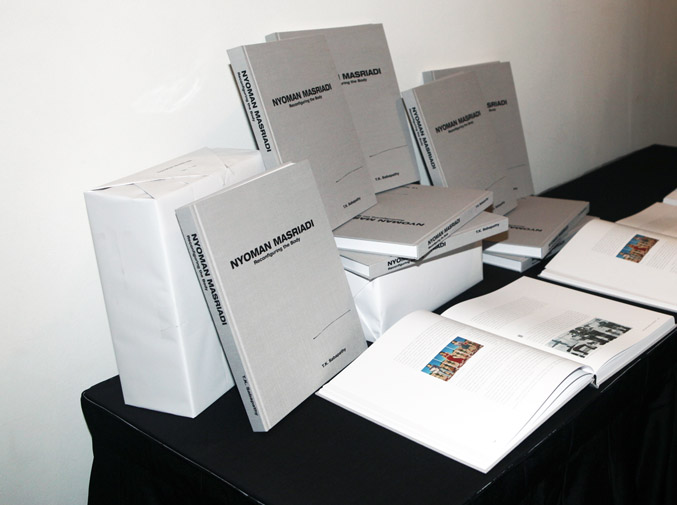
Book launch

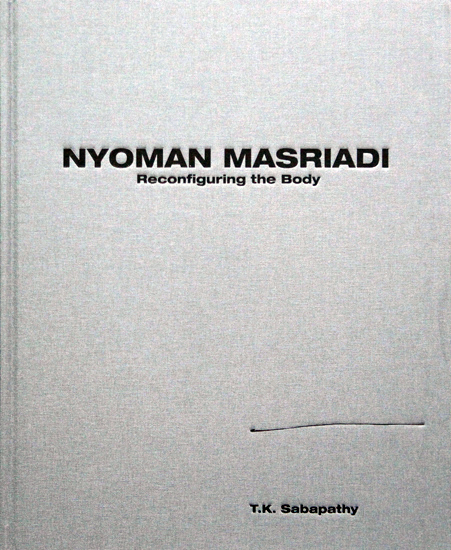
Book cover

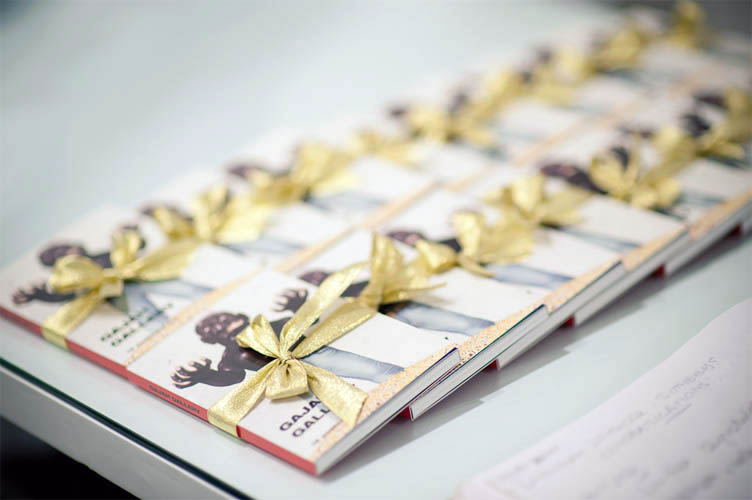
Postcard set

Publication

Despite Masriadi's contribution to and influence on Indonesian art there has not been, until this book, much written discussion of his work. Nyoman Masriadi – Reconfiguring the Body provides a consideration of the evolution of Masriadi's art practice. Goenawan Mohamad uncovers the local complexities and richness of contemporary Indonesian society and experience.

=== Masriadi: Black Is My Last Weapon ===
Singapore Art Museum presented Masriadi: Black is My Last Weapon in collaboration with Gajah Gallery which featured over 30 works completed in the past decade. It was published on the occasion of the Masriadi: Black is My Last Weapon exhibition from 22 August to 9 November 2008. Presented by curators Seng Yu Jin and Wang Zineng in four thematic sections, with each theme serving as a weapon, in the sense of an apparatus for engagement, to the interior world of the artist.

=== Group exhibition postcard set ===
A set of 15 postcards were designed as a commemorative piece for Gajah Gallery's 15th year anniversary celebration. The set is a compilation of work by Ahmad Zakii Anwar, J Ariadhitya Pramuhendra, Jumaldi Alfi, M. Irfan, Mangu Putra, Nyoman Masriadi, Teng Nee Cheong and Yunizar.

== Selected press ==
- Barnaby, Martin, "Master of his own mythology," Financial Times, 5/17/13.
- Genocchio, Benjamin, "Is Jakarta the Next Art Market Capital?," Artinfo, 5/4/13.
- Kinsella, Eileen, "Nyoman Masriadi's Dark Satire of Indonesian Culture Finds A Global Audience," Artinfo, 3/2/13.

== See also ==
- Fendry Ekel
