= Yunizar =

Indonesian painter

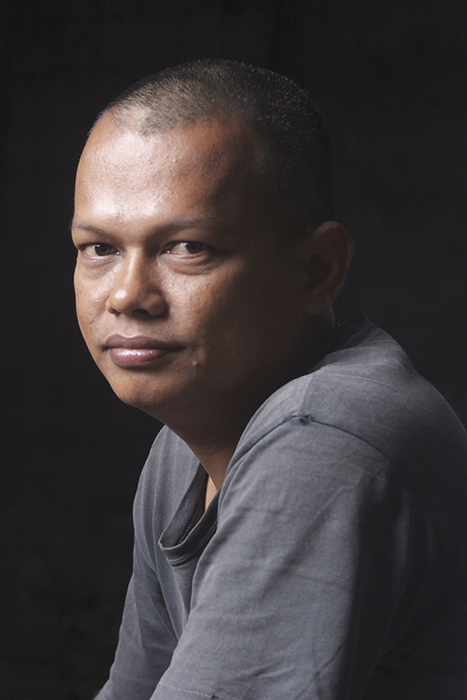
- Born: June 1971; Talawi, West Sumatra
- Movement: Jendela

Yunizar (born June 1971) is an Indonesian artist. He was born in Talawi, West Sumatra, Indonesia. He graduated in 1999 with a degree in Fine Arts from Indonesian Institute of the Arts, Yogyakarta (ISI), a school of national pride and the heart of progressive art-making in Indonesia. Creativity and change are the forefront of the school's agenda and this is evident in Yunizar's work ethic. Yunizar's training reveals itself in his sophisticated expressive style, articulated through a playful composition and subtle palette. Executed primarily in acrylic and pencil, his works stand out in terms of texture, colour, brushwork and rhythm. A restrained palette of cool colours- yellows, browns and greens- is deliberately dirtied and smudged in his working and reworking of the canvas. The result is a highly tactile work that entices the viewer to feel the piece.

Born a Minang, Yunizar felt at home at Yogyakarta and decided to remain in the city with his wife and children after graduation. There, he co-founded the Jendela Art Group, Jendela which means window in Bahasa Indonesian, together with his Minang peers namely Handiwirman Saputra, Jumaldi Alfi, Yusra Martunus and Rudi Mantofani. Jendela Art Group is Indonesia's most prominent contemporary art collective and has participated in numerous group and solo exhibitions in Indonesia, Hong Kong and Singapore. In 1995, he was awarded "Best Painting" from the Peksiminas lll Exhibition in Jakarta and in 1998, he was awarded "Top 10" from the highly prestigious Phillip Morris ASEAN Art Award V.

Yunizar's subjects are often close to his heart and everyday life, simple and recognizable. Yet beneath this simplicity lies a deeper theme. To a casual observer, his titles for his works may appear uninspired. But upon delving deeper, one will find that they often provide a hint of mystery to his portraits whilst adding an element of cynicism. He is a painter whose works may be described by an attempt to advance his preoccupation for still-life. Bottles, potted-cactus, apples and other elements are painted singly, and later reproduced in simplified outlines, eventually multiplying exponentially as minuscule elements on a vast canvas, as crammed two-dimensional landscapes choking on its own reproductive capacity. At other times he obliterates this multiplicity, displacing it with a single figure, or a head, unsmiling, disfigured and consumed by a sense of estrangement or exile. In a distinctive series Coretan (Marks), lines and markings are deployed as frantic utterance. Obfuscating and never declaring any form of intent. However, the sense of narrative is kept remaining in the fringes of the frame, is eternally held in anxious tension. One of Indonesia's most dynamic new artists, Yunizar draws from a rich heritage to create images that evoke memories of dreams and myths as well as the mundane.

== Work ==
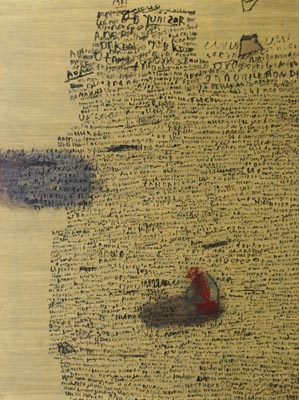
Catatan Pinggir (Text Within a Margin), 2007, Acrylic on Canvas, 200 x 150cm

Yunizar spent his formative years at the Indonesian Institute of Arts in Yogyakarta. This is a school of national pride and the heart of progressive art-making in Indonesia. Historically, Yogyakarta is the seat of traditional, global and popular fused in a fertile and stimulating environment, culminating in an art scene that is bold and original. Yunizar's training and maturity shines through with his palette make-up; faded colours, sun bleached and weather fatigued. The colours reflect his surroundings in Indonesia and remains a constant theme in his works. This restrained palette of yellows, browns and greens is juxtaposed with society's craving for all things new and bright. It hints at his desire to deconstruct the audience's notions of beauty, and how it is composed. For Yunizar, beauty in art comes through complex compositions that introduce different ways of perceiving things.

Preferring to play with empty spaces, his paintings carry his signature abstract style with a focus on texture that invites the viewer to reach out for a feel. He understands and manipulates materials, working primarily in acrylic and pencil, artfully building volume and anti-rhythm with his brushwork and setting forth impressions through contrast and lines, forms and colours.

Coretan: Recent Works by Yunizar Exhibition

Coretan, Yunizar's Solo Exhibition at the National University of Singapore Museum in 2008 became the cornerstone of the artist's signature style. The 'coretan' paintings, a series which began from the late 1990s, may be said to be frustratingly elusive, delightfully enigmatic. These works are composed of illegible scribbling, rendered in lines repeated across the canvas. The scribbling appears as fragments of text, a diarylike parchment of thoughts that struggles to find form or intelligible representation.

The repetition and technique in scribbling marks a desire for meaning to be limitless in perspective. The spontaneous lines are a reflection of the artist's inhibition with the constricting form both text and image sometimes takes. The works are composed of illegible scribbling in lines across the canvas, appearing as fragments of text that struggles to find form or intelligent representation. Working with limited color, mostly monochromatic, his works reveal a play of lines and textures coming together to create clear rhythms and strong composition. The simplicity of visual elements within his works, according to Yunizar, is the result of a personal aesthetic judgment. He seeks beauty, especially in the trivial and in what is deemed by all else as useless and unimportant. To capture intuition and impulse, that is the great aim of the artist.

Also, there is a long history of oral traditions or Sastera Lisan within the Minangkabau culture. A need to seek narratives in its various forms has always been at the center of the pidato adat (ceremonial orations) which is at the heart of the Minangkabau culture. This is evident in the Coretan series, where the method space used is crucial to narrative. The position of poetic prose within the swirl of lines overwhelming the canvas belongs to a need to release self from the outlines of what has been constructed before. There is an unwillingness to allow the silence to form markers that leave the audience with a contained reading. Instead the abstraction acts as a sensation without an end.

Collaboration with Yogyakarta Art Lab

YAL is Gajah Gallery’s major initiative based in Yogyakarta; Indonesia’s up and coming art hub, co-founded in April 2012 by Yunizar, and Jasdeep Sandhu, owner of Gajah Gallery. Its first artistic collaboration was with Yunizar itself, the Lab was set up to reach out to all artists based in Indonesia.

While at YAL, Yunizar worked on a new project which included six pieces made of bamboo and banana leaf paper coated with a natural resin. The creation of Yunizar’s works utilized experimental production methods and new material and textural combinations, including molten-metal, thick paper (made by hand at YAL by Hungerford), as well as colors created with local materials, including dyes more commonly used in batik production. In the process of creating these works, Yunizar laid hot metal onto the thick pieces of hand-made natural paper, manipulating the fibers during the drying process, synthesizing the simple depictions of his everyday life in Indonesia with new elemental properties and visual textures. The result is a series of multi-textural works, two of which were presented at Art Stage Singapore 2013.

One of Yunizar's recent collaborations with Yogyakarta Art Lab saw him creating a series of bronze sculptures, which described by himself as a natural step to take in his artistic practice, to open up a new avenue for his creative expression. These works were first showcased during his solo exhibition held at Gajah Gallery in November 2014. By harnessing the expertise and equipment rendered by YAL, Yunizar, alongside the technicians at YAL experimented with metal casting which took a considerable amount of time perfecting. The end product is a series of 2-sided bronze sculptures that capture the enigmatic canvas protagonist of the artist.

== Exhibitions ==
=== Selected solo exhibitions ===
Year	Exhibition	Venue	Country
2016	The Garden In Eden	Gajah Gallery	Singapore
2014	Yunizar Solo Exhibition	Gajah Gallery	Singapore
2014	Yunizar	Ben Brown Fine Arts	London
2012	Yunizar: Story	Ben Brown Fine Arts	Hong Kong
2010	Jogja Psychedelia – Flowers from Yunizar	Gajah Gallery	Singapore
2007	Coretan – Recent Works by Yunizar	Gajah Gallery	Singapore
2006	Biasa Aja	Gajah Gallery	Singapore
2005	Reborn	Sin Sin Fine Art Gallery	Hong Kong
2002	–	Chouinard Gallery	Hong Kong
2001	New Sensation	Gajah Gallery	Singapore
2001	Exploring Spacing	Mien Gallery	Yogyakarta, Indonesia
2001	Room, Space & Wilderness	–	Yogyakarta, Indonesia

=== Selected group exhibitions ===
Year	Exhibition	Venue	Country
2017	Jogja Biennale XIV	Jogja National Museum	Yogyakarta, Indonesia
2017	Art Basel Hong Kong	Convention and Exhibition Centre	Hong Kong
2017	Art Stage Singapore	Marina Bay Sands, Sands Expo and Convention Centre	Singapore
2016	Archaeology of The Present	Gajah Gallery	Singapore
2016	Gajah Gallery 20th Anniversary Exhibition	Gajah Gallery	Singapore
2014	Bazaar Art Jakarta	The Ritz Carlton Pacific Place Ballroom	Jakarta, Indonesia
2015	Intersections: Latin American and Southeast Asian Contemporary Art	Gajah Gallery	Singapore
2014	Pandora No. 2	OFCA International	Yogyakarta, Indonesia
2014	Art Basel Hong Kong	Hong Kong Convention and International Centre	Hong Kong
2013	Seeing Paintings:Conversations Before The End Of History	Sangkring Art Space	Yogyakarta, Indonesia
2013	Lokanat Ground Zero	Gajah Gallery	Singapore
2013	Lokanat Ground Zero	Lokanat Gallery	Yangoon, Myanmar
2013	Art Stage	Gajah Gallery	Singapore
2012	India Art Fair with Gajah Gallery	New Delhi	India
2011	Art Stage	Gajah Gallery	Singapore
2009	Jogja Biennale X	Yogyakarta	Indonesia
2009	Jendela – A Play of the Ordinary	NUS Museum	Singapore
2006	Angkor-The Djin Within	Gajah Gallery	Singapore
2005	CP-Open Biennale: Urban/culture	–	Jakarta, Indonesia
2004	Merahnya Merah (How Red is Red)	Nadi Gallery	Jakarta Indonesia
2004	Object(ify)	Nadi Gallery	Jakarta, Indonesia
2004	Faces	Chouinard Gallery	Hong Kong
2003	Borobudur International Festival	H.Widayat Museum	Magelang, Indonesia
2002	Alfi-Yunizar-Mantofani	Chouinard Gallery	Hong Kong
2002	Indofood Art Awards	National Museum	Jakarta & ARMA Agung Rai Art Museum Bali, Indonesia
2001	Not Just Political	H.Widayat Museum	Magelang, Indonesia
2000	Indonesian Expressions	–	Singapore
1999	From a Window, Group Exhibition of the JENDELAll	Padma Gallery	Bali, Indonesia

=== Selected private and public collections ===
Collection	Country
Benesse Art Collection	Japan
Long Museum Collection	China
Singapore Art Museum	Singapore
National University Museum	Singapore

== Publications ==
- Jogja Psychedelia Flowers From Yunizar (30 July-29 August 2010) Soemardja Gallery Faculty of Art and Design, Bandung Institute of Technology JL.G
- Yunizar Diary 2010 (10 December 2009 – 10 January 2010) Gajah Gallery
- JENDELA: A Play of the Ordinary (5 March-19 April 2009) NUS Museum
- Coretan Recent Works By Yunizar (16 November – 9 December 2007) NUS Museum
- Biasa Aja: A Solo Exhibition by Yunizar (19–29 October 2006) Gajah Gallery
