= J Ariadhitya Pramuhendra =

Indonesian artist

J Ariadhitya Pramuhendra (born in 1984 in Indonesia), is an Indonesian artist who includes self-portraits in his works. He is known for his realistic black and white charcoal paintings.
