= Han Snel =

Dutch painter

Han Snel (16 July 1925–26 May 1998) was a Dutch painter born in Scheveningen, near the Hague, The Netherlands. He moved as a conscript to Indonesia in 1946 as part of the Dutch fight to keep control over their former colony. After the independence of Indonesia, he applied for political asylum and started to paint on the island of Bali. Snel converted to Hinduism and became a citizen of Indonesia.

His work is in the collection of the Indianapolis Museum of Art.
