= Jim Supangkat =

Indonesian sculptor, art critic and curator

Jim Supangkat is an Indonesian sculptor, art critic and curator.

== Life ==
Supangkat was born on May 2, 1948, in Makassar. He studied at the faculty of fine arts and Design of the Institute of Technology in Bandung. One of his teachers in this time was Dick Hartoko who taught him on Aesthetics. Directly after he graduated in 1975, he started to work as a sculptor. The same year, he was one of the founders of Gerakan Seni Rupa Baru (New Art Movement).

In the eighties he grew to be an art critic and independent curator of exhibitions of work of other Indonesian artists. Since the nineties this has become his full-time profession. Besides, he has been an active promoter of Indonesian contemporary fine arts and initiated art-theoretical debate on Southeast Asian forums.

He wrote several books and essays that put Indonesian art internationally on the map. For his contributions to Indonesian art he was honored with a Prince Claus Award from the Netherlands in 1997.

== Bibliography ==
- 1997: Indonesian modern art and beyond, ISBN 9789799513908
- 2005: Urban/Culture, ISBN 9789799100351
- 2005: Provocative bodies, interpreting the works of Mochtar Apin, 1990–1993, with Mochtar Apin, ISBN 9789799909107
- 2005: Gregorius Sidharta Sugijo : figurative works, with I Wayan Sukra, Lita and Arif B Prasetyo
- 2008: Self & reality Josephine Linggar, Nus Salomo, Davy Linggar, with Mia Maria, Adi Setiadi and Linggarseni
- 2009: Emmitan Gallery & ArtSocietes present solo exhibition of Willy Himawan : Fusion of Paradoxes, Emmitan Gallery
- 2010: Pleasures of Chaos, Inside New Indonesian Art, with Primo Giovanni Marella, ISBN 9788862081313
- 2010: Love me or die: Entang Wiharso, with Arif Suryobuwono and Christine E Cocca, ISBN 978-9792563733
- 2011: Chusin's realistic painting: a thesis, with Henny Rolan, National Gallery, Jakarta
- 2011: Edopop, with A Anzieb, Henny Cecilia Rolan and Rachel Saraswati, ISBN 978-6029701579
