= The Amazing Race 37 =

Season of television series

- Season 37
- Promotional poster
- Presented by: Phil Keoghan
- No. of teams: 14
- Winners: Carson McCalley & Jack Dodge
- No. of legs: 12
- Distance traveled: 29,000 mi (47,000 km)
- No. of episodes: 12

Release
- Original network: CBS
- Original release: March 5 – May 15, 2025

Additional information
- Filming dates: May 18 – June 14, 2024

Series chronology
- ← Previous; Season 36 Next → Season 38

The Amazing Race 37 is the thirty-seventh season of the American reality competition show The Amazing Race. Hosted by Phil Keoghan, it featured fourteen teams of two, each with a pre-existing relationship, competing in a race around the world to win US$1,000,000. This season visited three continents and ten countries and regions, traveling over 29,000 miles (47,000 km) during twelve legs. Starting in Los Angeles, racers traveled through Hong Kong, Japan, Indonesia, the United Arab Emirates, Bulgaria, Italy, Germany, France, and Portugal, before returning to the United States and finishing in Miami.

Billed and advertised as a "Season of Surprises", each leg of the race includes a twist in the form of an obstacle or a unique task. New elements introduced this season include the Fork in the Road, the Driver's Seat, and Valet Roulette. Elements of the show that returned for this season include the double elimination leg, the Intersection, the Live U-Turn Vote, the Fast Forward, the Double U-Turn, the non-elimination leg, the Head-to-Head, and the Scramble. The season premiered on CBS on March 5, 2025, and concluded on May 15, 2025.

Best friends and gamers Carson McCalley and Jack Dodge were the winners of this season, while siblings Han and Holden Nguyen finished in second place, and married parents Jonathan and Ana Towns finished in third place.

== Format ==
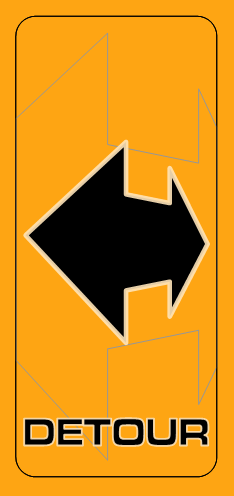
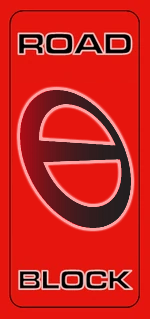
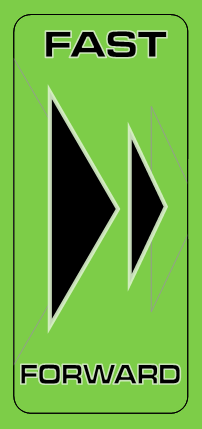
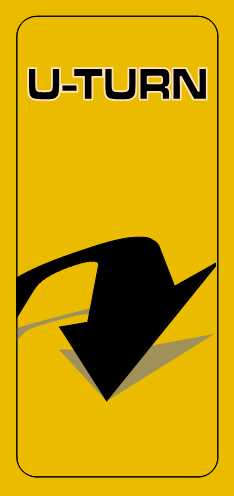
The clues which contestants receive during the course of the race generally fall into five categories: Route Info, Detour, Roadblock, Fast Forward, and U-Turn.

The Amazing Race is a reality television show created by Bertram van Munster and Elise Doganieri, and hosted by Phil Keoghan. The series follows teams of two competing in a race around the world. Each leg of the race requires teams to deduce clues, navigate foreign environments, interact with locals, perform physical and mental challenges, and travel on a limited budget provided by the show. At each stop during the leg, teams receive clues inside sealed envelopes, which fall into one of these categories:

- Route Info: These are simple instructions that teams must follow before they can receive their next clue.
- Detour: A Detour is a choice between two tasks. Teams may choose either task and switch tasks if they find one option too difficult. There is usually one Detour present on each leg.
- Roadblock: A Roadblock is a task that only one team member can complete. Teams must choose which member will complete the task based on a brief clue they receive before fully learning the details of the task. There is usually one Roadblock present on each leg.
- Fast Forward: A Fast Forward is a task that only one team may complete, which allows that team to skip all remaining tasks on the leg and go directly to the next Pit Stop. Teams may only claim one Fast Forward during the entire race.
- Intersection: An Intersection requires two teams to work together until otherwise instructed.
- U-Turn: The U-Turn allows teams to force another team to complete both options of the Detour before they can continue the race.
- Scramble: A Scramble allows teams to complete a set of three tasks in any order that they choose. At the end of each task, teams receive one of three clue puzzle pieces that reveal their next destination after they are combined.
- Driver's Seat: A Driver's Seat allows one team to determine the work requirements for every team during a designated task.

Most teams who arrive last at the Pit Stop of each leg are progressively eliminated, while the first team to arrive at the finish line in the final episode wins the grand prize of US$1,000,000.

== Contestants ==
Scott and Lori Thompson were revealed early on January 9, 2025, on a special "Survivor V Amazing Race" episode from the second season of Raid the Cage. The full cast was revealed on February 5, 2025. With fourteen teams, this season features the largest cast for the American edition of The Amazing Race.

Contestants	Age	Relationship	Hometown	Status
Jackye Clayton	51	Sisters	Waco, Texas	Eliminated 1st & 2nd (in Hong Kong)
Lauren McKinney	61	Sisters	Waco, Texas	Eliminated 1st & 2nd (in Hong Kong)
Mark Crawford	63	Retired Firefighters	Watertown, Tennessee	Eliminated 1st & 2nd (in Hong Kong)
Larry Graham	59	Retired Firefighters	Bartlett, Tennessee	Eliminated 1st & 2nd (in Hong Kong)
Ernest Cato	59	Father & Daughter	Chicago, Illinois	Eliminated 3rd (in Minoh, Japan)
Bridget Cato	28	Father & Daughter	Somerville, Massachusetts	Eliminated 3rd (in Minoh, Japan)
Courtney Ramsey	33	Dating Nurses	Leland, North Carolina	Eliminated 4th (in Kyoto, Japan)
Jasmin Carey	34	Dating Nurses	Leland, North Carolina	Eliminated 4th (in Kyoto, Japan)
Bernie Gutierrez	31	Friends	Dallas, Texas	Eliminated 5th (in Kubu, Indonesia)
Carrigain Scadden	33	Friends	Denver, Colorado	Eliminated 5th (in Kubu, Indonesia)
Scott Thompson	47	Married Parents of Eight	Salt Lake City, Utah	Eliminated 6th (in Nusa Dua, Indonesia)
Lori Thompson	49	Married Parents of Eight	Salt Lake City, Utah	Eliminated 6th (in Nusa Dua, Indonesia)
Jeff "Pops" Bailey	65	Father & Son Lumberjacks	St. Louis, Missouri	Eliminated 7th (in Dubai, United Arab Emirates)
Jeff Bailey	36	Father & Son Lumberjacks	St. Louis, Missouri	Eliminated 7th (in Dubai, United Arab Emirates)
Nick Fiorito	32	Brothers	Brooklyn, New York	Eliminated 8th (in Sarantsi, Bulgaria)
Mike Fiorito	28	Brothers	Brooklyn, New York	Eliminated 8th (in Sarantsi, Bulgaria)
Melinda Papadeas	66	Mother & Daughter	Chandler, Arizona	Eliminated 9th (in Sofia, Bulgaria)
Erika Papadeas	32	Mother & Daughter	Englewood, Colorado	Eliminated 9th (in Sofia, Bulgaria)
Brett Hamby	36	Married Vegas Performers	Las Vegas, Nevada	Eliminated 10th (in Scherwiller, France)
Mark Romain	37	Married Vegas Performers	Las Vegas, Nevada	Eliminated 10th (in Scherwiller, France)
Alyssa Borden	31	Married Nurses	Philadelphia, Pennsylvania	Eliminated 11th (in Vila Nova de Gaia, Portugal)
Josiah Borden	32	Married Nurses	Philadelphia, Pennsylvania	Eliminated 11th (in Vila Nova de Gaia, Portugal)
Jonathan Towns	42	Married Parents	Pomona, California	Third place
Ana Towns	35	Married Parents	Pomona, California	Third place
Han Nguyen	26	Siblings	Los Gatos, California	Runners-up
Holden Nguyen	22	Siblings	Los Gatos, California	Runners-up
Carson McCalley	28	Best Friends & Gamers	Brooklyn, New York	Winners
Jack Dodge	27	Best Friends & Gamers	Brooklyn, New York	Winners

== Results ==
The following teams are listed with their placements in each leg. Placements are listed in finishing order.

- A red placement with a dagger (†) indicates that the team was eliminated.
- An underlined blue placement with a double-dagger (‡) indicates that the team was the last to arrive at a Pit Stop in a non-elimination leg.
- A green ƒ indicates that the team won the Fast Forward.
- A purple ε indicates that the team used an Express Pass on that leg to bypass one of their tasks.
- A brown ⊃ indicates that the team used the U-Turn and a brown ⊂ indicates the team on the receiving end of the U-Turn.
- A violet + indicates that teams encountered an Intersection.
- A teal γ indicates that teams encountered a Fork in the Road.

Team placement (by leg)
Team	1γ (Note: This leg featured a Fork in the Road, where teams were presented with two routes to the Pit Stop. Teams in the left column chose the Sing route, while teams in the right column chose the Dance route.)		2+ (Note: This leg featured an Intersection. The combined teams were, in order of formation: Ernest & Bridget and Brett & Mark, Carson & Jack and Jonathan & Ana, Alyssa & Josiah and Nick & Mike, Courtney & Jasmin and Pops & Jeff, Han & Holden and Melinda & Erika, and Bernie & Carrigain and Scott & Lori.)	3	4	5	6	7	8	9	10	11	12
Carson & Jack		1st	4th	2nd	2nd	2nd	1stƒ	6th	4th	4th	1st	1st	1st
Han & Holden	5th		11th	9th	6th	5th	2nd	4th⊂ (Note: Nick & Mike chose to use the U-Turn on Han & Holden.)	5th	5th‡	4th	2nd	2nd
Jonathan & Ana	2nd		1st	3rd	1stε (Note: Jonathan & Ana used their Express Pass to bypass the Roadblock on this leg.)	8th⊂ (Note: In leg 5, the teams each voted for one team to be U-Turned; the two teams with the most votes received the U-Turn. Scott & Lori and Jonathan & Ana tied for the most votes (4 each), while Nick & Mike received 1 vote.)	5th	3rd	3rd	1st	3rd	3rd	3rd
Alyssa & Josiah	1st		3rd	7th	5th	3rd	3rd	1st	2nd	3rd	2ndε (Note: Alyssa & Josiah used their Express Pass to bypass the cheese task on this leg.)	4th†	
Brett & Mark		2nd	9th	5th	7th	1st	4th	2nd	1st	2nd	5th†		
Melinda & Erika	6th		5th	4th	4th	6th	6th	5th⊃ (Note: Melinda & Erika chose to use the U-Turn on Nick & Mike.)	6th†				
Nick & Mike		5th	10th	8th	8th	7th	7th	7th†^{⊂}_{⊃}					
Pops & Jeff	4th		7th	6th	9th	4th	8th†						
Scott & Lori	3rd		2nd	1st	3rd	9th†⊂							
Bernie & Carrigain		4th	8th	10th	10th†								
Courtney & Jasmin		6th	6th	11th†									
Ernest & Bridget		3rd	12th†										
Mark & Larry		7th†											
Jackye & Lauren	7th†												

== Race summary ==
The route of The Amazing Race 37.

Destinations	Air travel Rail travel Water travel Bus travel Helicopter travel Bicycle travel Gondola travel
Route Markers	Detour Roadblock Fast Forward Head-to-Head Fork in the Road Intersection; Express Pass Driver's Seat U-Turn Valet Roulette Scramble Pit Stop

=== Leg 1 (United States → Hong Kong) ===
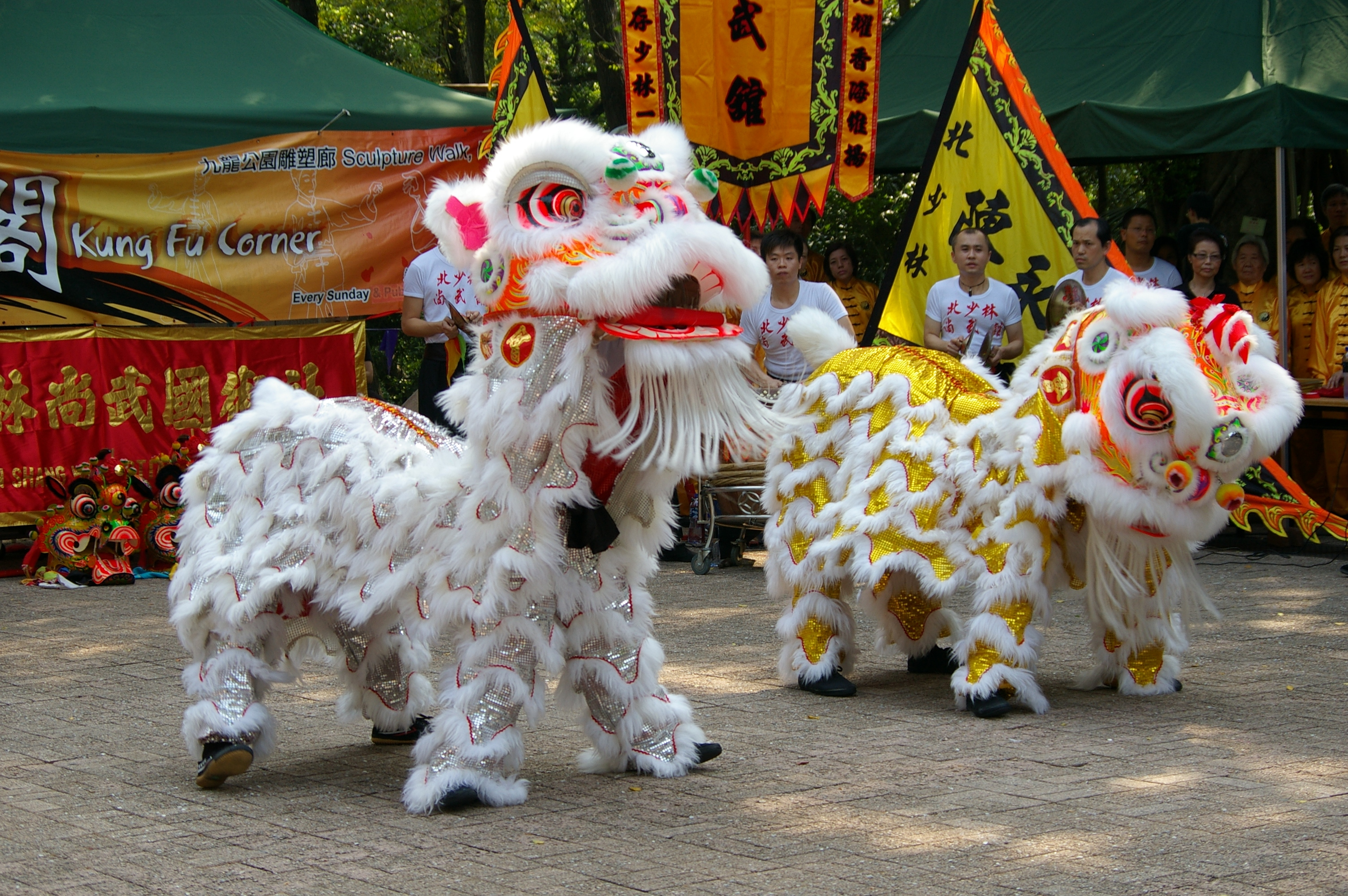
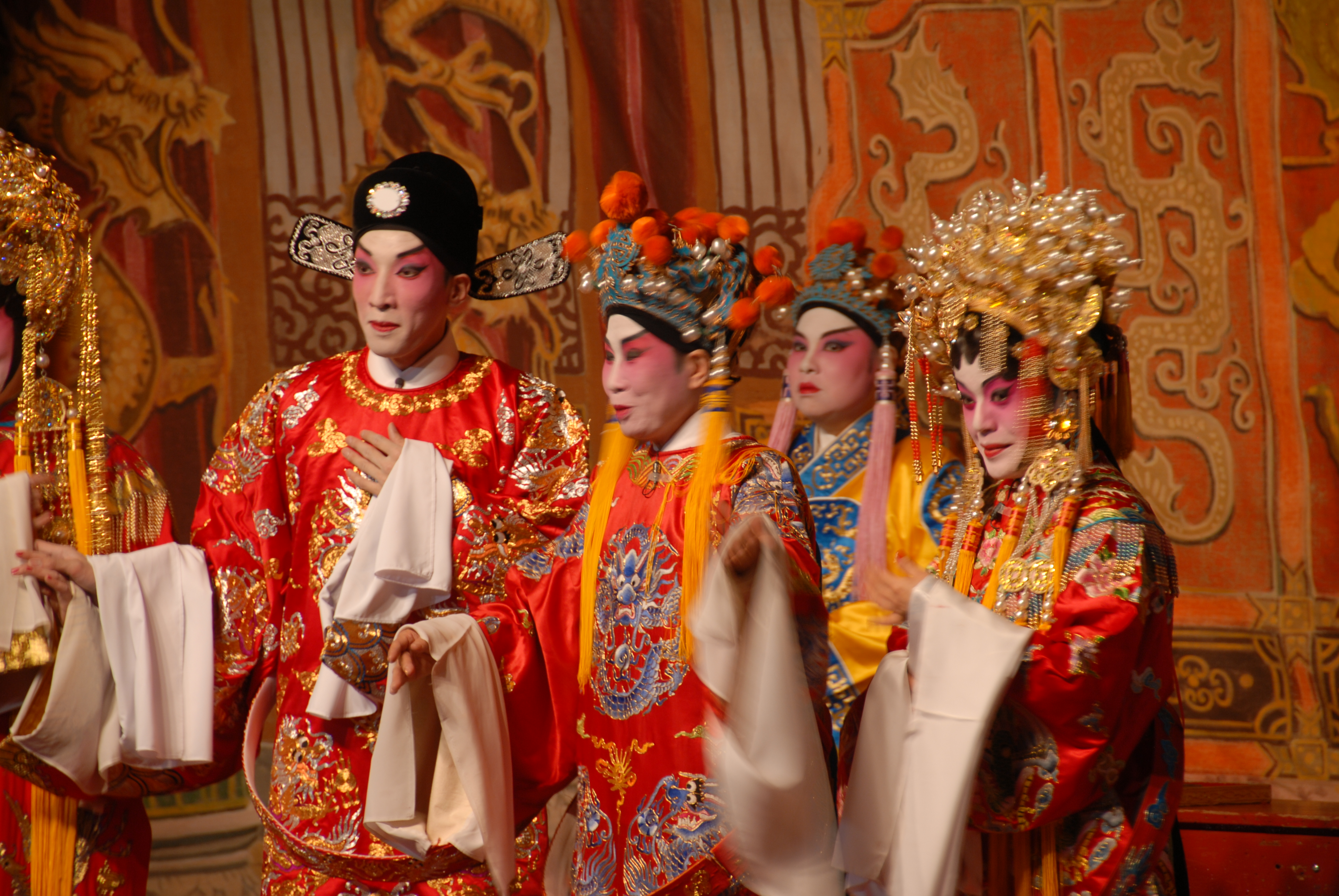
The first ever Fork in the Road made teams choose between two parallel routes to the Pit Stop in Hong Kong: perform a lion dance or a Cantonese opera.
- Episode 1: "Double the Stakes, Double the Eliminations" (March 5, 2025)
- Prize: US$3,000 (awarded to Carson & Jack and Alyssa & Josiah)
- Eliminated: Mark & Larry and Jackye & Lauren

Locations

- Los Angeles, California (Academy Museum of Motion Pictures) (Starting Line)
- Los Angeles → Hong Kong
- Hong Kong (Tian Tan Buddha)
- Hong Kong (Central Piers → Cheung Chau Ferry Pier)
- Hong Kong (Cheung Chau Family Walk)
- Hong Kong (Pak Tai Temple Playground)
- Hong Kong (Cheung Chau Ferry Pier → Central Piers)
- Hong Kong (Lok Kwan Street Park (in Chinese))
- Hong Kong (Jao Tsung-I Academy (in Chinese) or Xiqu Centre)
- Hong Kong (West Kowloon Cultural District – Art Park Terrace)

Episode summary

- Teams began at the Academy Museum of Motion Pictures and drove to the airport, where they had to book one of two flights to Hong Kong. Once there, teams had to travel by Lantau Taxi to the Tian Tan Buddha and climb up the stairs to the clue box. Teams then traveled to Central Piers, took the Sun Ferry to Cheung Chau, and searched the promenade in Cheung Chau Family Walk for their next clue.
- In this season's first Roadblock, one team member had to climb a Cheung Chau Bun Festival bamboo tower at the Pak Tai Temple Playground and retrieve their next clue from the top.
- After the Roadblock, teams had to take the ferry back to Central Piers and then find their next clue at Lok Kwan Street Park.
- Teams encountered the Fork in the Road and had to choose one of two routes to the Pit Stop: Dance (跳舞 – tiu3 mou5) or Sing (唱歌 – coeng3 go1). In Dance, teams had to travel to Jao Tsung-I Academy and perform a short lion dance routine to receive their next clue. In Sing, teams traveled to Xiqu Centre, where they had to dress up in traditional costume and make-up and perform a section of a Cantonese opera, fully in Cantonese, to receive their next clue. Each route had a limit of seven teams, and teams had to reveal their choices for later-arriving teams.
- After completing either route, teams had to check in at the Pit Stop: the Art Park Terrace in the West Kowloon Cultural District.

Additional note

- The first team on each path of the Fork in the Road to reach the Pit Stop was awarded a prize, while the last team on each path was eliminated.

=== Leg 2 (Hong Kong → Japan) ===
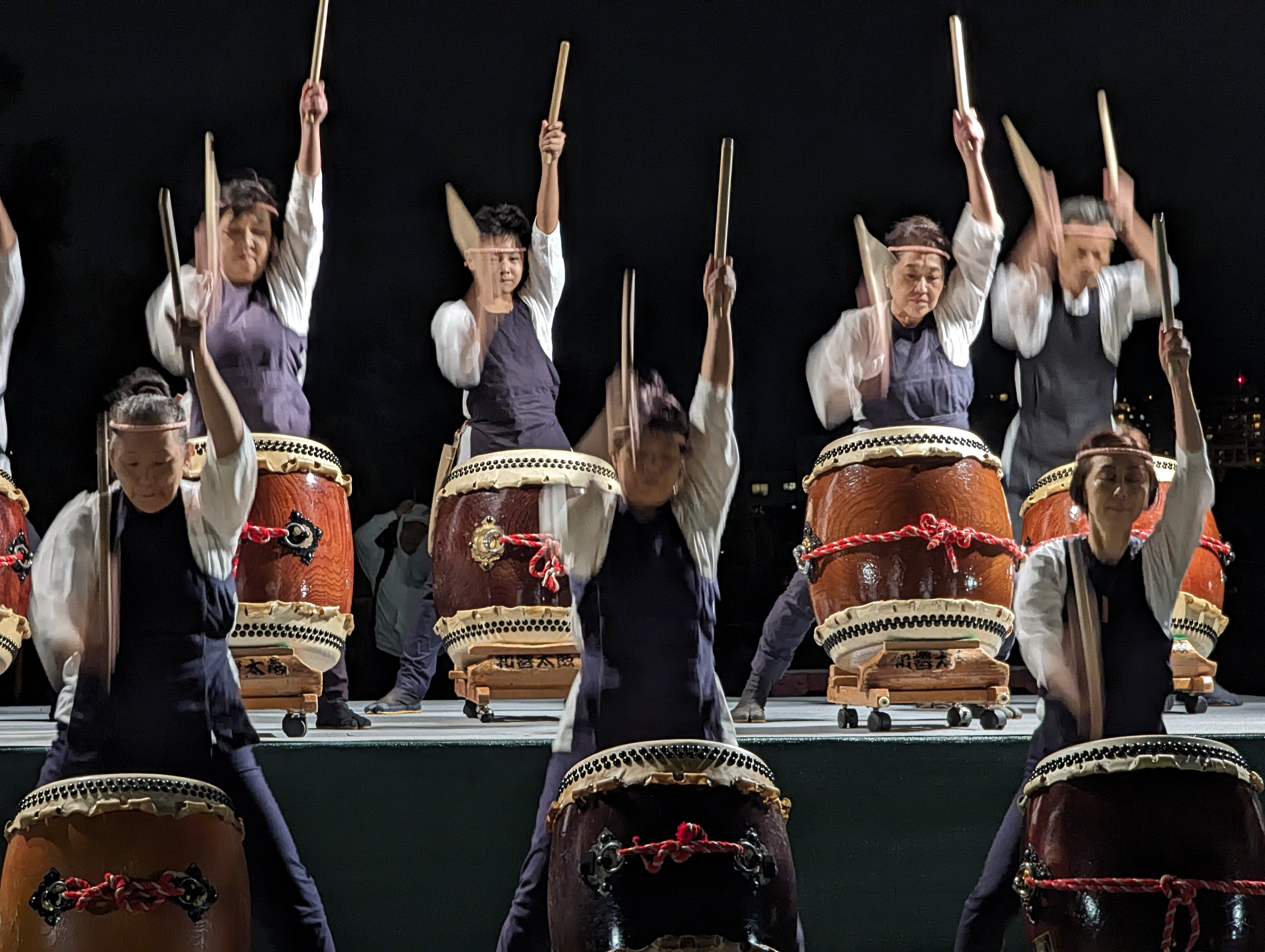
For a combined Intersection and Roadblock, racers had to perform with a taiko drum group while in Osaka.

- Episode 2: "Very Strong Warrior Energy" (March 12, 2025)
- Prize: Cashback rewards for a trip for two to Kilimanjaro, Tanzania (awarded to Jonathan & Ana)
- Eliminated: Ernest & Bridget

Locations

- Hong Kong (Tsim Sha Tsui Promenade)
- Hong Kong (Crocodile Center (in Chinese) – Skywards Travel)
- Hong Kong → Osaka, Japan
- Osaka (Tsūtenkaku Tower)
- Osaka (Namba Hatch (in Japanese))
- Osaka (Dōtonbori Bridge)
- Sakai (Ohama Daishin Arena or Ohama Sumo Arena)
- Minoh (Katsuō-ji Tahōtō)

Episode summary

- At the start of this leg, teams were instructed to fly to Osaka, Japan, with teams required to book their flight at the Crocodile Center. Once there, teams had to travel to the Tsūtenkaku Tower and find their next clue, which sent them to Namba Hatch.
- Teams encountered an Intersection, which required two teams to mutually join together to complete the following task. The teams were paired up thusly: Ernest & Bridget and Brett & Mark, Carson & Jack and Jonathan & Ana, Alyssa & Josiah and Nick & Mike, Courtney & Jasmin and Pops & Jeff, Melinda & Erika and Han & Holden, and Bernie & Carrigian and Scott & Lori.
- In this leg's Roadblock, one member from each of the newly-joined teams had to memorize and perform a taiko drum routine alongside a drum group to receive their next clue. After this task, teams were no longer joined.
- After the Roadblock, teams had to travel on foot to the Dōtonbori Bridge, which had their next clue.
- This season's first Detour was a choice between Mochi or Mawashi. In Mochi, teams had to pound steamed rice with a large mallet and then make twelve mochi balls to receive their next clue. In Mawashi, both team members had to properly wrap a mawashi on each other and then push a sumo wrestler out of a sumo ring to receive their next clue.
- After the Detour, teams had to check in at the Pit Stop: Katsuō-ji Tahōtō in Minoh.

Additional note

- Teams left the Pit Stop in the order they arrived, regardless of which route they took in the previous leg.

=== Leg 3 (Japan) ===
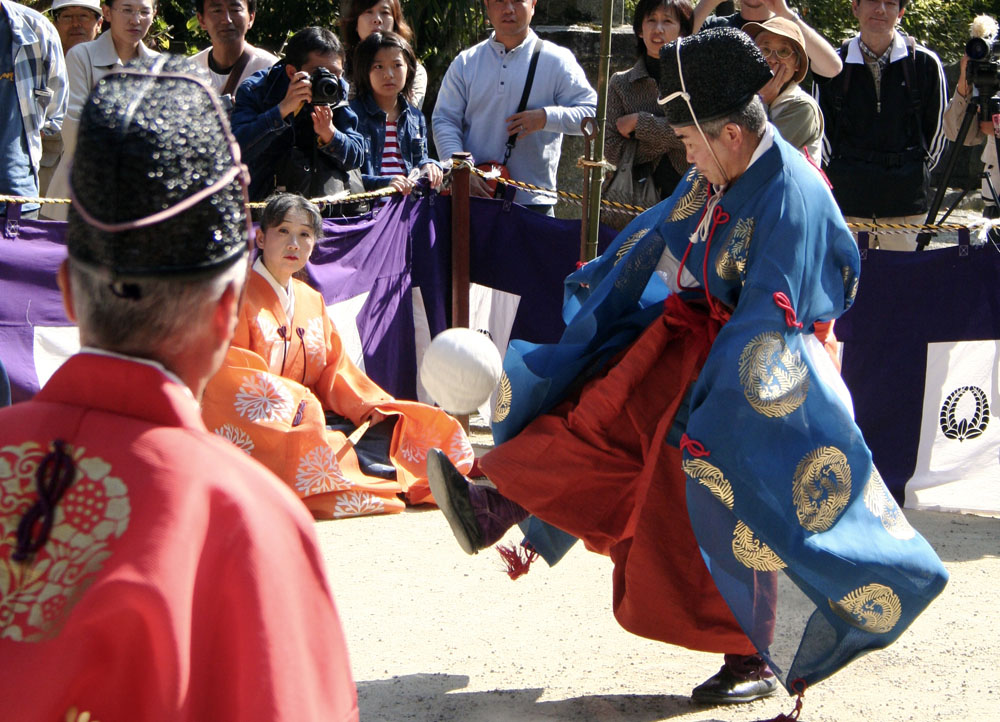
During their second leg in the Kansai region, teams had a chance to win an Express Pass by playing kemari in Kyoto.

- Episode 3: "Chaotic, Crazy, That's What We're Used To" (March 19, 2025)
- Prize: US$5,000 (awarded to Scott & Lori)
- Eliminated: Courtney & Jasmin

Locations

- Osaka (Osaka Castle Park)
- Osaka → Kyoto
- Kyoto (Shimogamo Shrine)
- Kyoto (Shiramine Shrine)
- Kyoto (Yasaka Kōshin-dō)
- Kyoto (Kyoto Budo Center (in Japanese))
- Kyoto (Konkaikōmyō-ji)

Episode summary

- At the start of this leg, teams were instructed to travel by bullet train to Kyoto. Once there, teams found their next clue at the Shimogamo Shrine. There, teams had to buy a sheet of fortune paper called o-mikuji and dip it into water to reveal their next destination: the Shiramine Shrine.
- In this leg's Roadblock, one team member had to play kemari (a game similar to hacky sack) and complete five passes of a ball among three other players to receive their next clue. One team had the option of winning an Express Pass if both team members could complete the Roadblock. Jonathan & Ana won the Express Pass.
- After the Roadblock, teams had to travel by taxi to Yasaka Kōshin-dō and find their next clue.
- This leg's Detour was a choice between Fold It or Fling It. In Fold It, teams had to fold a human-sized origami crane to receive their next clue. In Fling It, teams had to dress as ninjas and then both team member had to throw three shuriken stars, throw three bō shuriken spikes, and blow three fukibari darts using a fukiya into a target to receive their next clue.
- After the Detour, teams had to check in at the Pit Stop: Konkaikōmyō-ji. There, Keoghan informed teams of a new element in the next leg: the Driver's Seat.

=== Leg 4 (Japan → Indonesia) ===
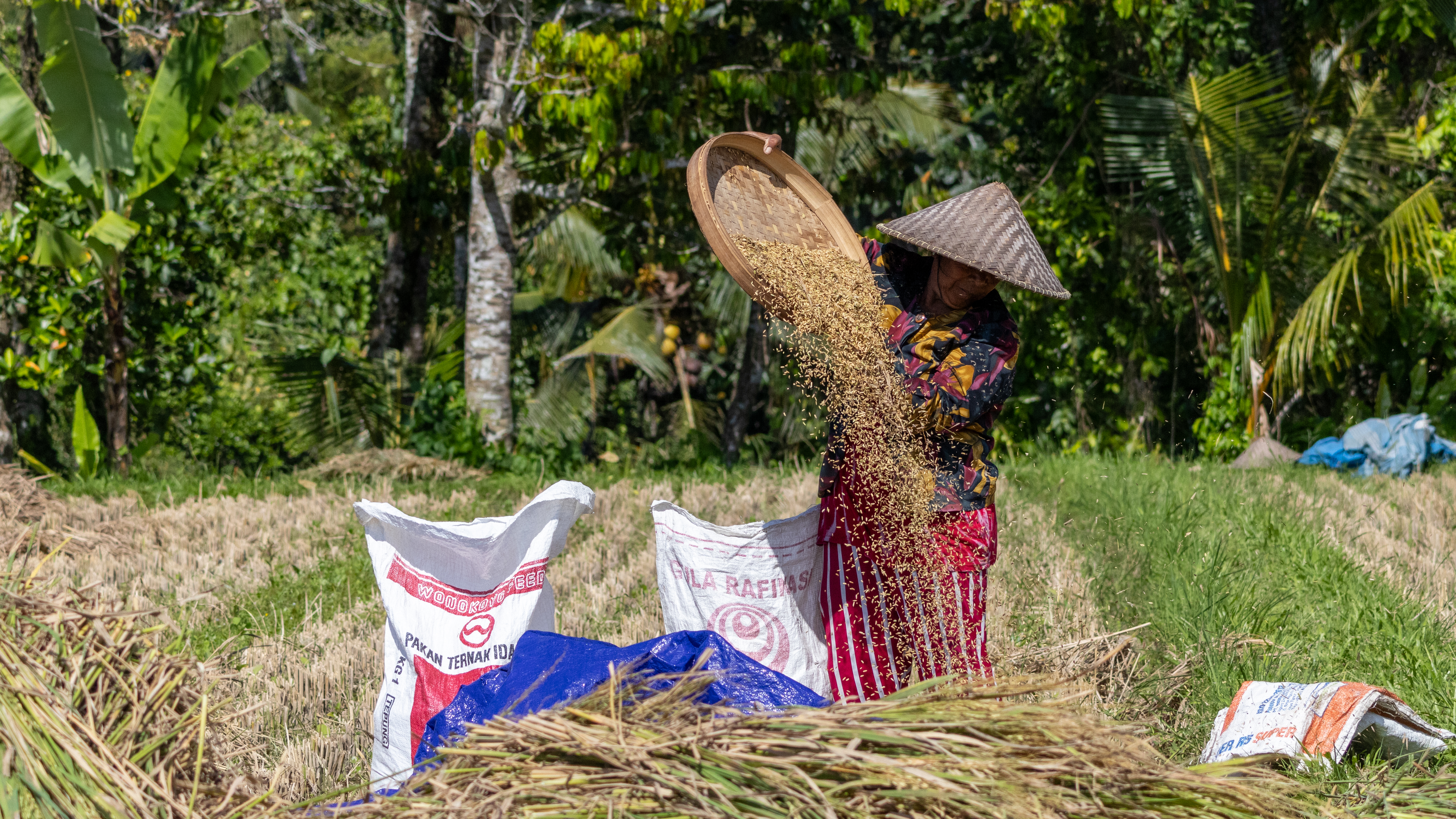
On the island of Bali, the first ever Driver's Seat determined how much rice racers had to thresh during the Roadblock.

- Episode 4: "There's No Addresses in the Jungle" (March 26, 2025)
- Prize: Cashback rewards for a trip for two to Dubrovnik, Croatia, and Kotor, Montenegro (awarded to Jonathan & Ana)
- Eliminated: Bernie & Carrigain

Locations

- Osaka (Utsubo Park)
- Osaka (GS Travel)
- Osaka → Denpasar, Indonesia
- Payangan (Pura Puseh Bali Aga Bayad)
- Payangan (Kuber Waterfall)
- Tampaksiring (Gabah Ayu Rice Fields)
- Kubu (Penglipuran Village)
- Kubu (Pura Dalem Pelapuan)

Episode summary

- At the start of this leg, teams were instructed to fly to Denpasar, Indonesia, on the island of Bali, with teams required to book their flight at GS Travel. Once there, teams had to travel by taxi to the Pura Puseh Bali Aga Bayad and wait until morning for their next clue. Teams then had to drive an ATV to a waterfall and retrieve their next clue, which sent them to the rice fields in Tampaksiring.
- In this leg's Roadblock, one team member had to thresh a designated amount of rice to receive their next clue. Teams encountered a Driver's Seat at the Roadblock, where the first team to arrive determined how much rice racers had to thresh. Jonathan & Ana publicly assigned 15 pounds to themselves and Melinda & Erika; 20 pounds to Brett & Mark, Carson & Jack, and Han & Holden; and 25 pounds to Alyssa & Josiah, Bernie & Carrigain, Nick & Mike, Pops & Jeff, and Scott & Lori. Jonathan & Ana used their Express Pass to bypass this task.
- After the Roadblock, teams found their next clue at Penglipuran Village.
- This leg's Detour was a choice between Penjor or Pajegan. In Penjor, teams had to add decorations to a penjor bamboo pole and then carry it to a stand to receive their next clue. In Pajegan, teams had to memorize two pajegans, purchase identical fruits used in the offerings, and recreate them. Teams then had to balance the pajegans on their heads and bring them to a temple to receive their next clue.
- After the Detour, teams had to travel on foot to the Pit Stop: Pura Dalem Pelapuan in Penglipuran.

=== Leg 5 (Indonesia) ===
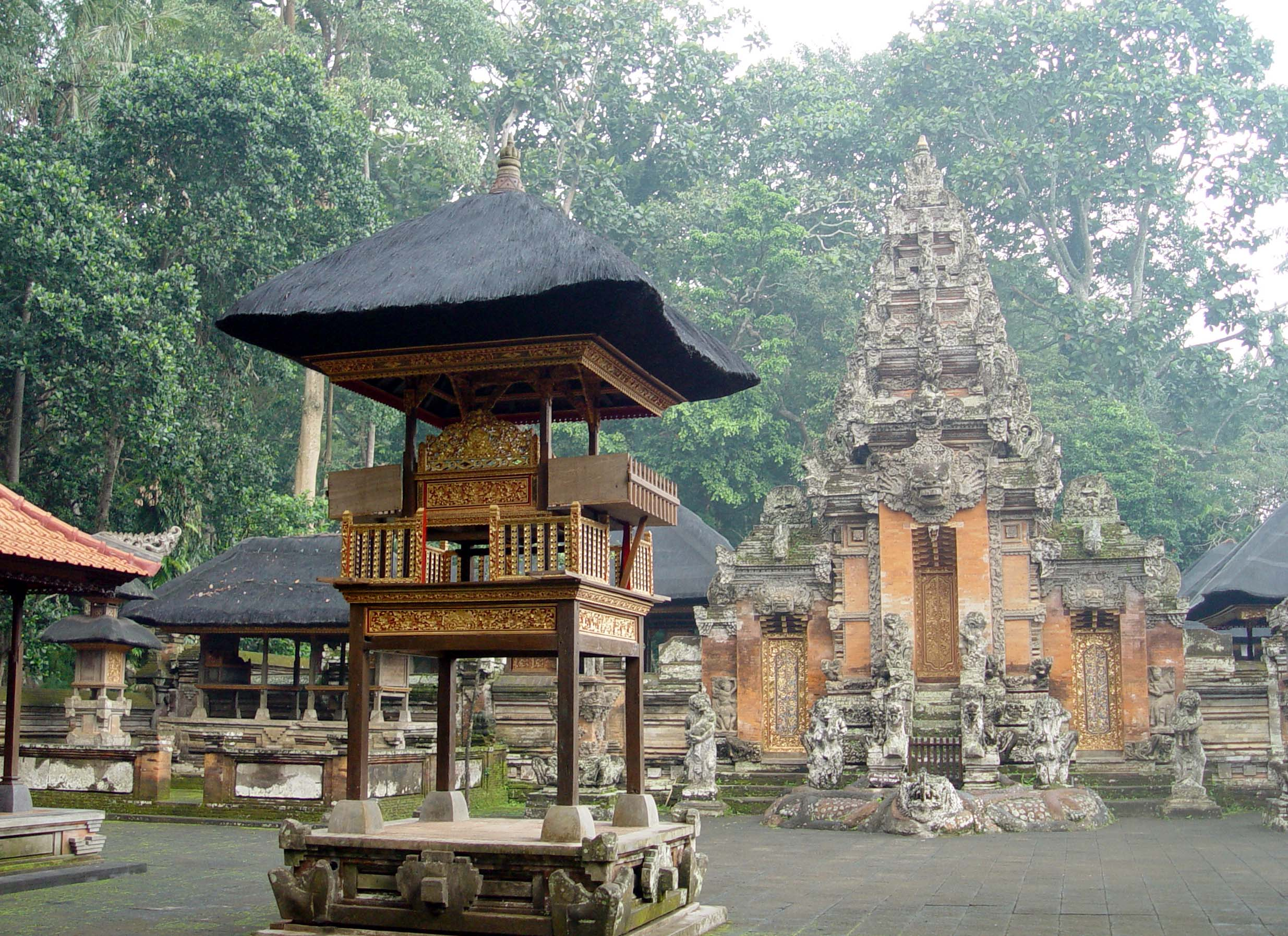
After finding Phil Keoghan outside of Pura Dalem Agung Padangtegal, teams took part in a Live U-Turn Vote.

- Episode 5: "It's Not Personal, It's Business" (April 2, 2025)
- Prize: US$10,000 (awarded to Brett & Mark)
- Eliminated: Scott & Lori

Locations

- Kubu (Penglipuran Village – Homestay)
- Padangtegal (Sacred Monkey Forest Sanctuary – Pura Dalem Agung Padangtegal)
- Kutuh (Pantai Pandawa)
- Nusa Dua (Nusa Dua Beach)
- Nusa Dua (Peninsula Island – Taksu Art Stage)

Episode summary

- At the start of this leg, teams were instructed to travel to the Sacred Monkey Forest Sanctuary. Once there, teams found Phil Keoghan, who informed them that they would have an open vote for a Double U-Turn on this leg, outside of Pura Dalem Agung Padangtegal. After the Live Double U-Turn Vote, Keoghan gave teams their next clue, which sent them to Pantai Pandawa.
- This leg's Detour was a choice between Coconuts or Coral. In Coconuts, teams had to load a bicycle with coconuts and deliver them down the beach to the Warung Van Ronden Cafe. After delivering 60 coconuts, teams had to stack them onto a rack to receive their next clue. In Coral, teams had to attach five species of coral to a reef star, snorkel with the star out into the ocean, and deposit it for coral reef restoration to receive their next clue.
- After the Detour, teams had to find their next clue at Nusa Dua Beach.
- In this leg's Roadblock, one team member had to choose a surfboard, paddle out into the surf, and find a surfer with identical board decal to receive their next clue, which directed teams to travel on foot to the Pit Stop: the Taksu Art Stage at Nusa Dua Beach.

Additional note

- Teams encountered a Live Double U-Turn Vote. The teams' votes, as well as the voting order, were as follows:

U-Turn Vote results
Team	Vote
Brett & Mark	Scott & Lori
Jonathan & Ana	Nick & Mike
Pops & Jeff	Jonathan & Ana
Han & Holden	Scott & Lori
Melinda & Erika	Scott & Lori
Carson & Jack	Jonathan & Ana
Nick & Mike	Scott & Lori
Alyssa & Josiah	Jonathan & Ana
Scott & Lori	Jonathan & Ana

=== Leg 6 (Indonesia → United Arab Emirates) ===
The Fast Forward in Dubai required one team to search the underwater cityscape of Deep Dive Dubai.

- Episode 6: "It Smells Like the Desert" (April 9, 2025)
- Prize: A cruise for two to Alaska (awarded to Carson & Jack)
- Eliminated: Pops & Jeff

Locations

- Nusa Dua (Grand Hyatt Bali)
- Denpasar → Dubai, United Arab Emirates
- Murqquab (Platinum Heritage Desert Gate)
- Margham (Dubai Desert Conservation Reserve – Windsock)
- Margham (Skydive Dubai Desert Campus) → Dubai (Skydive Dubai Airstrip)
  - Dubai (Deep Dive Dubai)
- Palm Jumeirah (Atlantis The Royal)
- Dubai (Burj Al Arab Public Beach)
- Dubai (Mall of the Emirates Metro Station → Emirates Towers Metro Station)
- Dubai (Museum of the Future)

Episode summary

- At the start of this leg, teams were instructed to fly to Dubai, United Arab Emirates. Once there, teams had to travel to a Bedouin camp and select a release time. The following morning, teams rode camels into the desert to their next clue.
- In this leg's first Roadblock, one team member had to perform a tandem skydive over Dubai before reuniting with their partner and receiving their next clue.
- For this season's Fast Forward, one team had to find an orange Audi e-tron, travel to Deep Dive Dubai, don scuba diving gear, and search the world's deepest diving pool for the award. Carson & Jack won the Fast Forward.
- After the first Roadblock, teams found their next clue at Atlantis The Royal. There, teams had to add garnishes to an afternoon tea platter to receive their next clue, which sent them to Burj Al Arab Public Beach.
- In this leg's second Roadblock, one team member had to surf on an eFoil past three buoys to receive their next clue; teams could have the same person do both Roadblocks.
- After the second Roadblock, teams had to travel by taxi to the Mall of the Emirates metro station and then by Dubai Metro to the Pit Stop: the Museum of the Future.

=== Leg 7 (United Arab Emirates → Bulgaria) ===
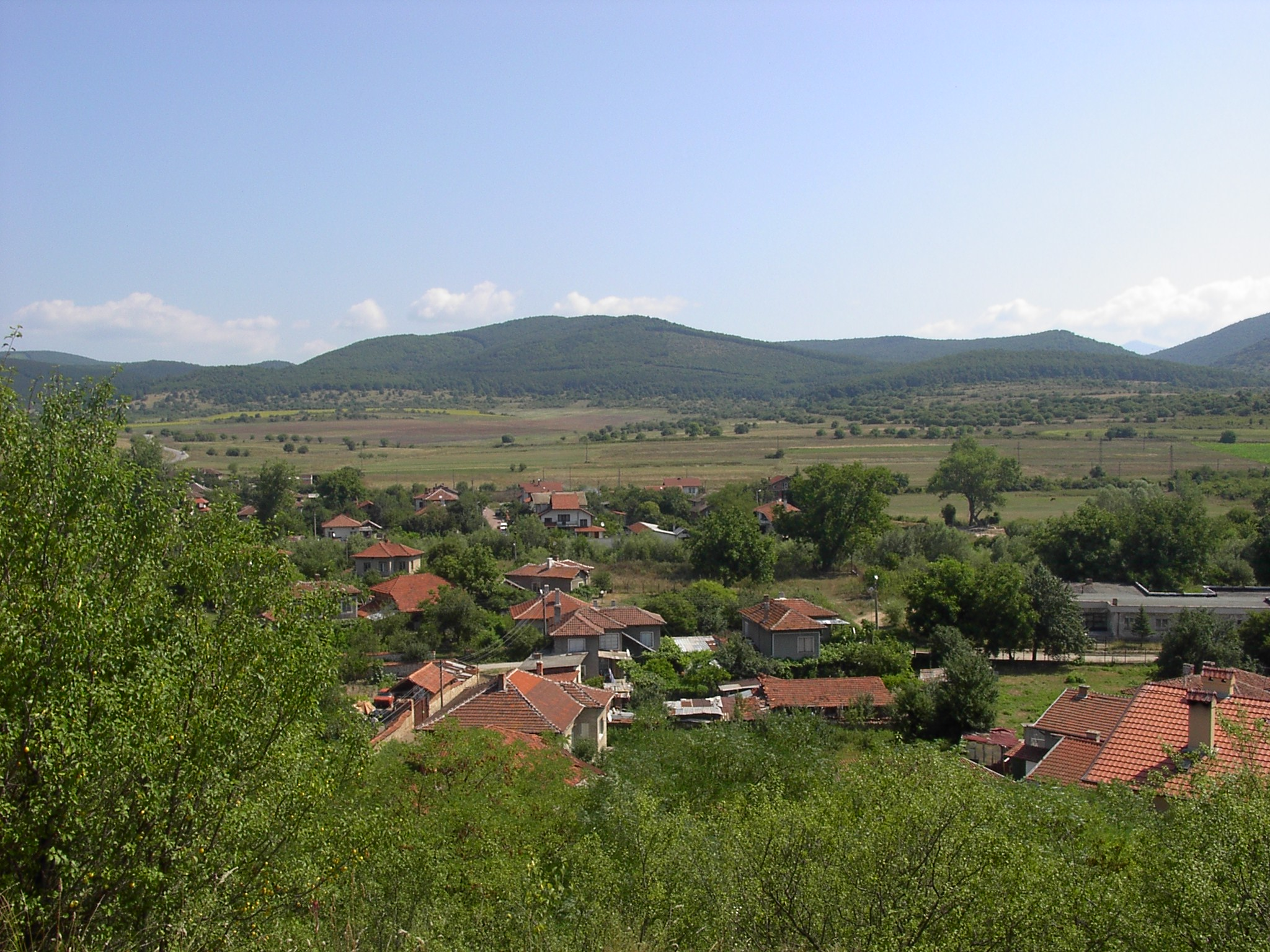
Teams encountered a surprise Double U-Turn after driving into the Saranska Valley of rural Bulgaria.

- Episode 7: "Be One with the Hay" (April 16, 2025)
- Prize: Cashback rewards for a trip for two to Marrakesh, Morocco (awarded to Alyssa & Josiah)
- Eliminated: Nick & Mike

Locations

- Dubai (Museum of the Future)
- Dubai → Sofia, Bulgaria (Sofia Airport)
- Negushevo (Village Square)
- Osoitsa (Village Library)
- Sarantsi (Farm)
- Sarantsi (Church of Saints Cyril and Methodius)
- Belopoptsi (Snezha's Farm)
- Elin Pelin (Village Square)

Episode summary

- At the start of this leg, teams were instructed to fly to Sofia, Bulgaria. Once there, teams had to search the airport for a car with their next clue, which directed them to drive to the village square of Negushevo. There, teams had to deliver three crates of apples to a Kukeri ritual to receive their next clue, which sent them to the village library in Osoitsa. There, teams had to search among the books for their next clue.
- This leg's Detour was a choice between Haystack or Woodstack. In Haystack, teams had to search three haystacks for a red and white Martenitsa yarn bracelet, which they could exchange for their next clue. In Woodstack, teams had to transport 200 kilograms (440 lb) of firewood using a wheelbarrow and a backpack to a home to receive their next clue.
- After the Detour, teams had to travel on foot to the Church of Saints Cyril and Methodius, which had their next clue with a Double U-Turn. Teams then had to drive to Snezha's Farm in Belopoptsi and find their next clue.
- In this leg's Roadblock, one team member had to milk a sheep until they obtained a half-liter of milk and then eat a bowl of Bulgarian yogurt to receive their next clue, which directed them to the Pit Stop: the village square of Elin Pelin.

Additional notes

- This leg featured a Double U-Turn. Melinda & Erika chose to use the U-Turn on Nick & Mike, while Nick & Mike chose to use the U-Turn on Han & Holden.
- Nick & Mike were unable to find the Martenitsa during the Haystack Detour task after being U-Turned by Melinda & Erika. After all of the other teams had already checked in at the Pit Stop, Phil came to the Detour to inform them of their elimination.

=== Leg 8 (Bulgaria) ===
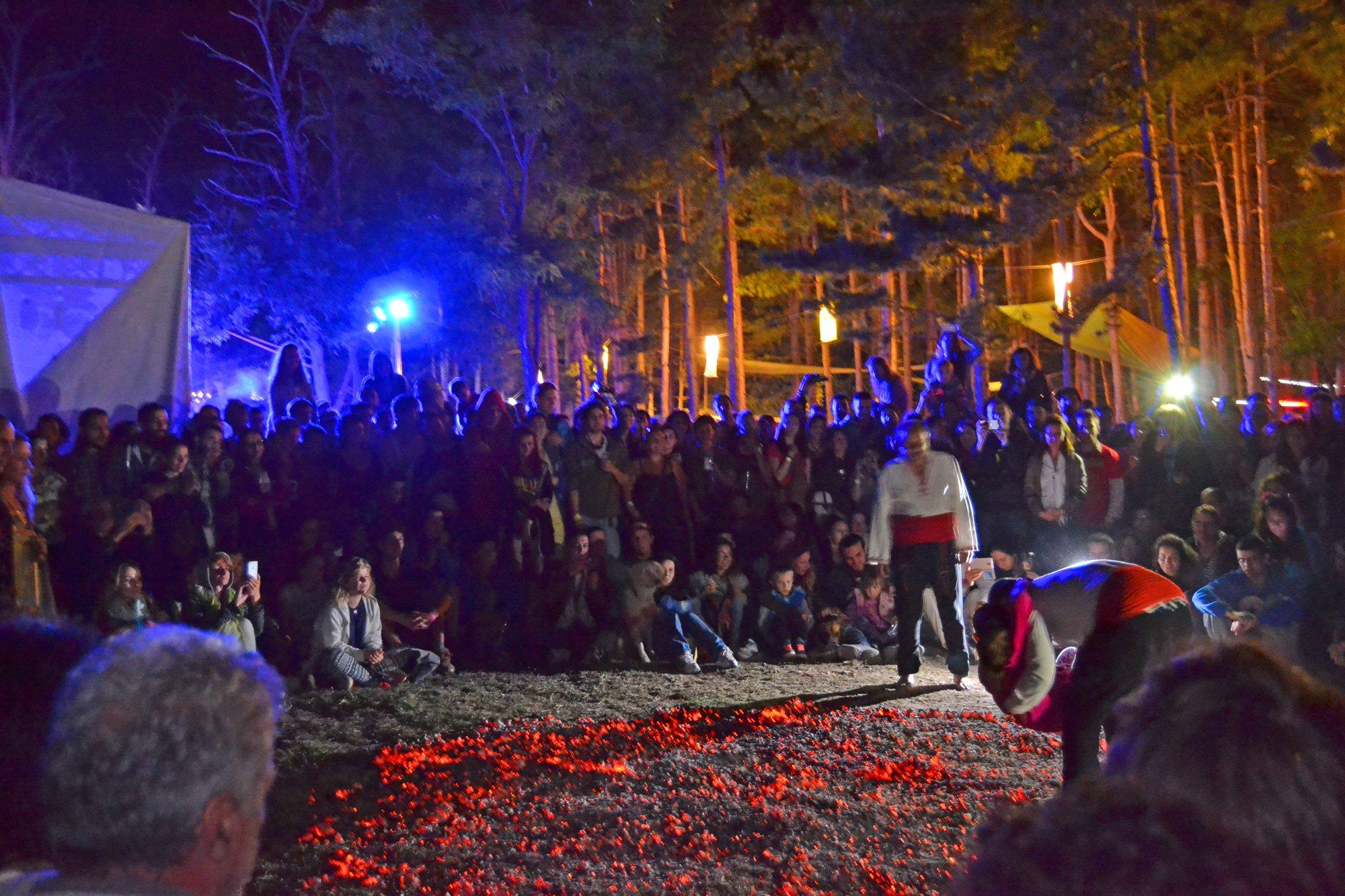
The second leg in Bulgaria had one team take part in the firewalking ritual of Nestinarstvo to win an Express Pass.

- Episode 8: "We're Letting Race Brain Win" (April 23, 2025)
- Prize: US$15,000 (awarded to Brett & Mark)
- Eliminated: Melinda & Erika

Locations

- Elin Pelin (Village Square)
  - Sofia (Fabrica 126)
- Sofia (Borisova Gradina – Lake Ariana)
- Sofia (Russian Monument Square – Klek Shop)
- Sofia (Sofia University – St. Kliment Ohridski Central Library (in Bulgarian))
- Sofia (Museum of Socialist Art)
- Sofia (Central Military Club)
- Sofia (Saint Alexander Nevsky Cathedral)

Episode summary

- At the start of this leg, teams were instructed to drive to Sofia.
- One team had the option of winning an Express Pass if both team members could take part in a Nestinarstvo ritual and firewalk over hot coals. Alyssa & Josiah won the Express Pass.
- After driving to Lake Ariana, teams had to take part in a Jordan Day tradition by searching the lake for a crucifix and exchanging it for their next clue. Teams could not travel by taxi for the rest of the leg.
- After finding their next clue at a klek shop near Russian Monument Square, teams had to travel to the library at Sofia University. There, teams had to translate a Bible verse from Cyrillic to English using a cypher to receive their next clue.
- Teams then had to search the sculpture garden at the Museum of Socialist Art for their next clue, which sent them to the Central Military Club.
- In this leg's Roadblock, one team member had to perform a Bulgarian folk dance called horo with a troupe of dancers to receive their next clue, which directed teams to travel by foot to the Pit Stop: the Saint Alexander Nevsky Cathedral.

=== Leg 9 (Bulgaria → Italy) ===
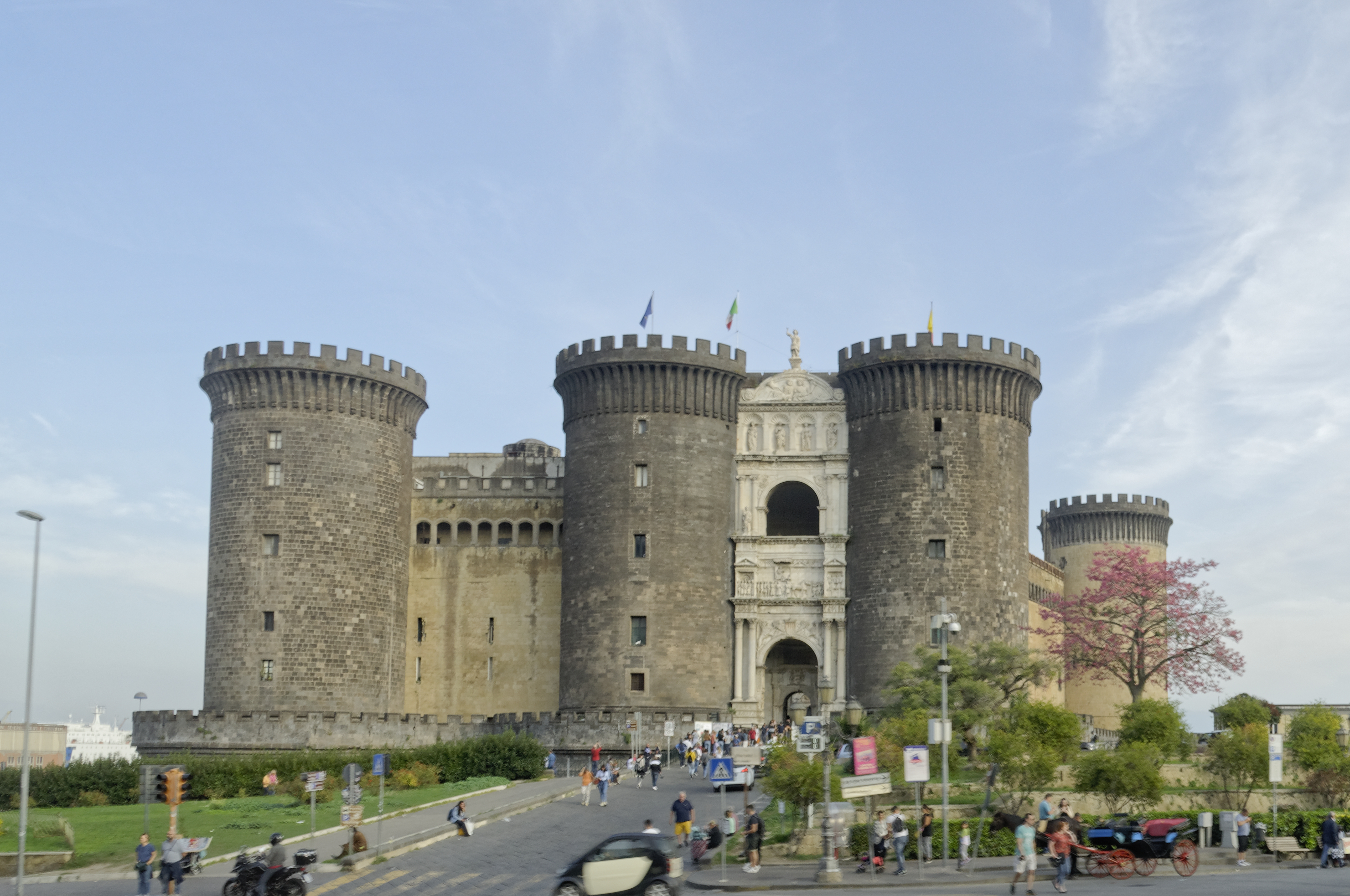
At the end of the leg in Naples at Castel Nuovo, Phil Keoghan revealed that the ninth leg was a non-elimination leg.

- Episode 9: "The Pizza de Résistance" (April 30, 2025)
- Prize: Cashback rewards for a trip for two to Mexico City, Mexico (awarded to Jonathan & Ana)

Locations

- Sofia (Saint Alexander Nevsky Cathedral)
- Sofia → Naples, Italy
- Naples (Stazione di Montesanto → Castel Sant'Elmo)
- Naples (Via dei Tribunali – Pulcinella Statue)
- Naples (Liuteria Anema e Corde or Palazzo Marigliano)
- Naples (Vico 2 Montesanto)
- Naples (Piazzetta Olivella)
- Naples (Ristorante da Ettore)
- Naples (Castel Nuovo)

Episode summary

- During the Pit Stop, teams had to book a flight to Naples, Italy, using a mobile app. Once there, teams had to travel by taxi to Stazione di Montesanto and by funicular to Castel Sant'Elmo, where they had to find an Il Capitano with their next clue. Teams then had to rub the nose of the Pulcinella statue to receive their next clue from a Pulcinella.
- This leg's Detour was a choice between Mandolin or Mozzarella. In Mandolin, teams had to assemble a Neapolitan mandolin to receive their next clue. In Mozzarella, teams had to braid six pieces of mozzarella into treccia plaits within a specified weight to receive their next clue.
- After the Detour, teams had to travel by foot to their next clue at Vico 2 Montesanto. Teams had to purchase groceries from a list written in Italian and deliver them using a bucket and rope to a resident on a balcony in exchange for their next clue. Teams then had to search Piazzetta Olivella for a marked car, which took them to their next clue at Ristorante da Ettore.
- In this leg's Roadblock, one team member had to make a Margherita pizza from scratch to receive their next clue, which directed them to deliver the pizza on foot to the Pit Stop: Castel Nuovo.

Additional note

- This was a non-elimination leg.

=== Leg 10 (Italy → Germany → France) ===
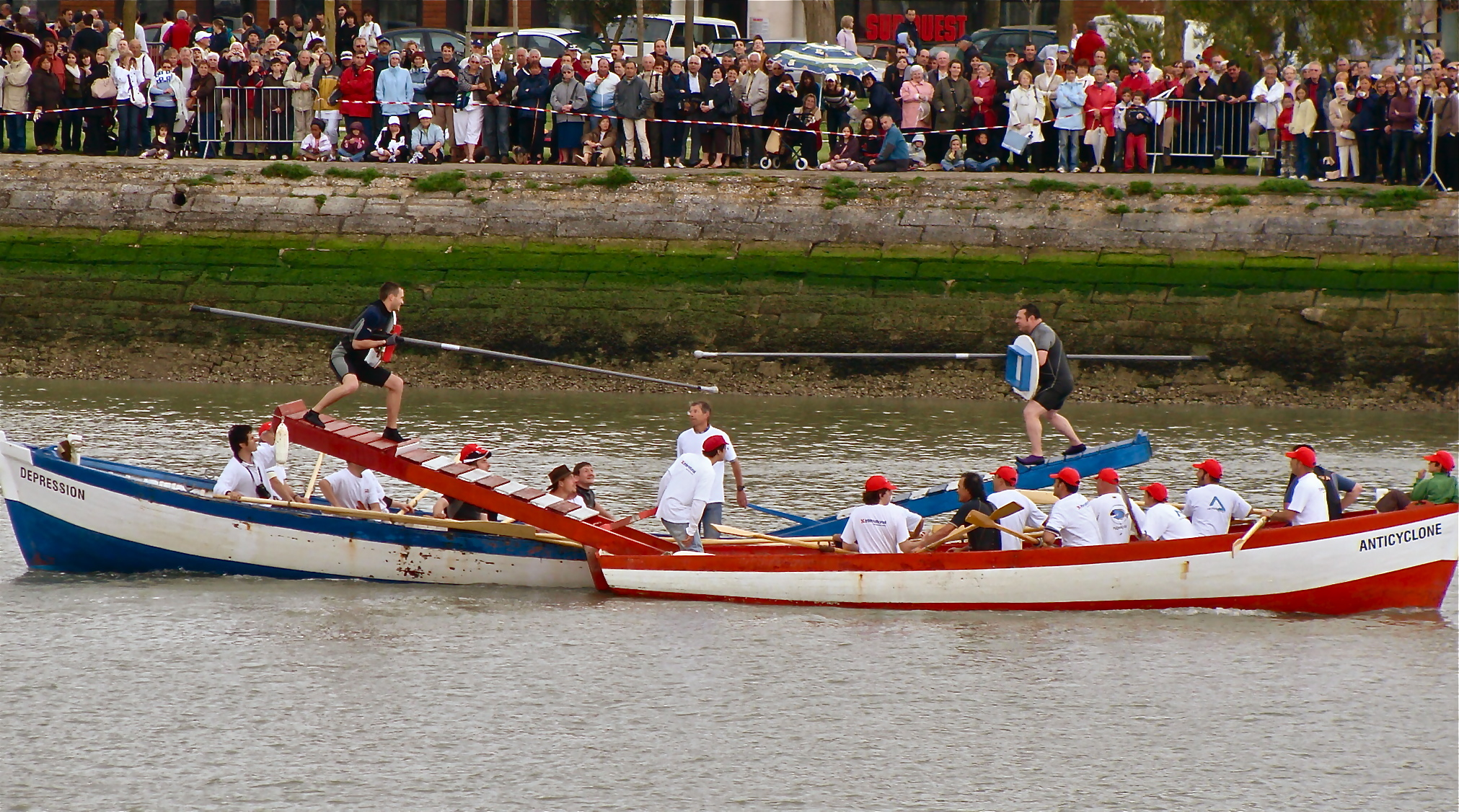
While in the Alsace region of France, teams faced off in a Head-to-Head by water jousting on the River Ill.

- Episode 10: "Up the River Without a Joust" (May 7, 2025)
- Prize: Cashback rewards for a trip for two to Helsinki, Finland (awarded to Carson & Jack)
- Eliminated: Brett & Mark

Locations

- Naples (Statua di Augusto)
- Naples → Frankfurt, Germany
- Frankfurt → Strasbourg, France
- Strasbourg (Palace of Europe)
- Strasbourg (Ponts Couverts)
- Strasbourg (River Ill)
- Strasbourg (La Cloche à Fromage Cheese Shop & La Cloche à Fromage Restaurant)
- Strasbourg (Cathédrale Notre-Dame de Strasbourg)
- Scherwiller (2 Rue du Maréchal Joffre or 4 Rue Saint-Wolfgang)
- Scherwiller (Table D'Orientation)

Episode summary

- At the start of this leg, teams were instructed to fly to Frankfurt, Germany, and then travel by train to Strasbourg, France. Once there, teams had to drive to the Palace of Europe, where they had to name the four Council of Europe member countries that they visited – Bulgaria, Italy, Germany, and France – to receive their next clue sending them to Ponts Couverts.
- In a combined Roadblock and Head-to-Head, one racer from two opposing teams had to compete against each other in a water joust. The first racer to push their opponent off a boat and into the River Ill using a lance received their next clue, while the losing racer had to wait for another team. The last remaining team had to wait out a ten-minute penalty. Brett & Mark lost the Head-to-Head.
- After the Roadblock, teams had to travel on foot to La Cloche à Fromage cheese shop. There, teams had to memorize nine types of cheese and then correctly identify the cheeses outside of the restaurant to receive their next clue, which sent them to the roof of the Cathédrale Notre-Dame de Strasbourg. Alyssa & Josiah used their Express Pass to bypass this task.
- This season's final Detour was a choice between Out to Dry or For the Birds. In Out to Dry, teams had to wash a tub of dirty laundry in a river to receive their next clue. In For the Birds, teams had to construct a stork nest to receive their next clue.
- After the Detour, teams had to drive to the Pit Stop: the table d'orientation.

=== Leg 11 (France → Germany → Portugal) ===
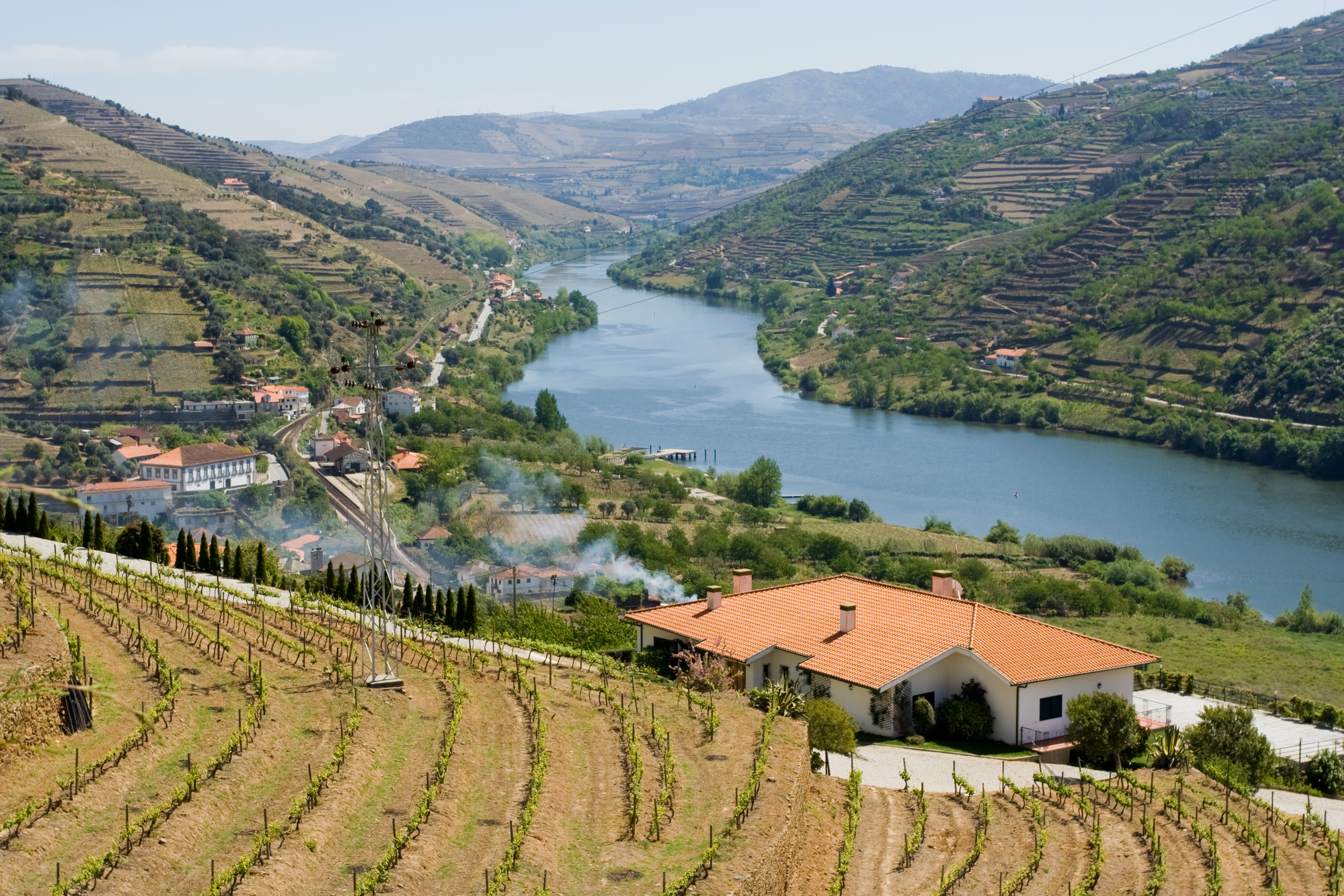
Before driving into the Douro Valley, teams had to choose their car for this leg through Valet Roulette.

- Episode 11: "My Knight in Shining Armor" (May 14, 2025)
- Eliminated: Alyssa & Josiah (Note: The eleventh episode ended on a cliffhanger with Alyssa & Josiah and Jonathan & Ana still working on the mural. The subsequent episode began with Jonathan & Ana beating out Alyssa & Josiah.)

Locations

- Strasbourg (Voyages Mosaic)
- Strasbourg → Frankfurt, Germany
- Frankfurt → Porto, Portugal (Porto Airport)
- Peso da Régua (Vila Marim – Granjão) → Lamego (Quinta de Santa Clara, Douro Valley)
- Santa Maria da Feira (Castle of Santa Maria da Feira)
- Porto (Campanhã Railway Station → São Bento Railway Station)
- Porto (ODE Porto Wine House)
- Vila Nova de Gaia (Douro River – Cais de Gaia)

Episode summary

- At the start of this leg, teams were instructed to travel to Porto, Portugal, with teams required to book their flight at Voyages Mosaic.
- In the airport, teams encountered Valet Roulette, where they had to randomly select keys for one of three manual or two automatic transmission cars from a valet board before receiving their next clue.
- Teams had to drive to Granjão, Vila Marim, which had their next clue. Teams then had to paddle a raft across the Douro River and roll two wine barrels uphill to a storage house in exchange for their next clue, which sent them to the Castle of Santa Maria da Feira.
- In this leg's Roadblock, the team member who had yet to perform their sixth Roadblock had to don medieval armor and hit three moving archery targets with a bow and arrow within seven tries to receive their next clue. (Note: Due to their Fast Forward win in Leg 6, Carson & Jack were able to freely choose who performed this Roadblock.)
- After the Roadblock, teams had to drive to the Campanhã railway station, travel by train to São Bento railway station, and search the station for a man selling tiles that listed their next destination: the ODE Porto Wine House. After find a clue there, teams had to solve an azulejo tile puzzle of the Pit Stop and mount it on a wall; the puzzle showed their final destination, the banks of the Douro River beneath the Luís I Bridge.

Additional note

- This leg had an unaired segment in Sabrosa. According to Carson & Jack in a post-season interview, teams had to drive from the airport to Casa da Pereira, the birthplace of Ferdinand Magellan. There, Magellan told teams about the places that he visited on his expedition around the world, and teams had to plot his route on a map from memory using string to receive their next clue.

=== Leg 12 (Portugal → United States) ===
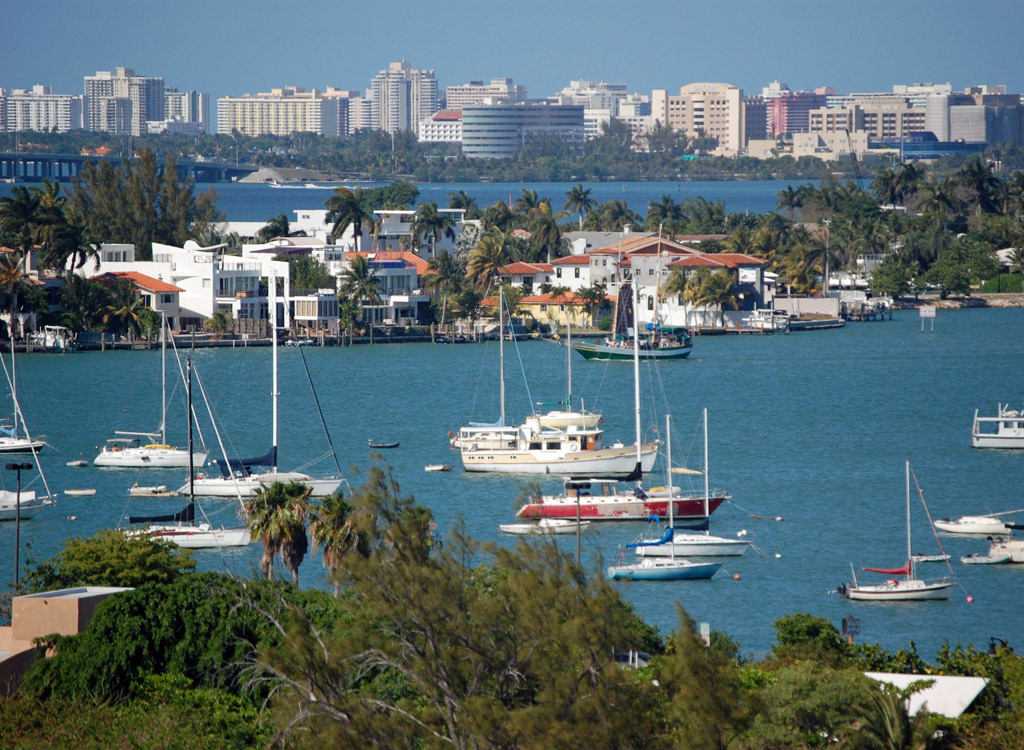
For the final surprise in the Season of Surprises, teams faced a water sports Scramble through Miami.

- Episode 12: "We're in Miami Baby!" (May 15, 2025)
- Prize: US$1,000,000
- Winners: Carson & Jack
- Runners-up: Han & Holden
- Third place: Jonathan & Ana

Locations

- Vila Nova de Gaia (Douro River – Cais de Gaia)
- Porto → Miami, Florida
- Key Biscayne (Crandon Park Marina) → Miami Beach (Maurice Gibb Memorial Park)
  - Miami (Coral Reef Yacht Club)
  - Miami (Venetian Marina & Yacht Club)
  - Miami Beach (South Pointe Park)
- Miami (Little Havana – Domino Park)
- Miami (Ice Palace Films Studios)
- Miami (LoanDepot Park)

Episode summary

- At the start of this leg, teams were instructed to fly on a provided business class flight to Miami, Florida. Once there, teams had to travel by taxi to Crandon Park Marina and board a Cigarette boat that took them across Biscayne Bay to their next clue.
- Teams encountered a Scramble and had to complete, in any order, three water-related tasks, to receive three pieces of a clue revealing their next destination.
  - For the task entitled Sail, teams had to learn how to sail an Optimist dinghy by watching a silent demonstration from students and then sail around six buoys surrounding a small island.
  - For this season's final Roadblock entitled Soar, one team member had to stay aloft on a Flyboard for 60 consecutive seconds.
  - For the task entitled Save, one team member had to pilot a watercraft to a mannequin floating in the ocean, while their partner, floating on a raft behind the craft, had to retrieve the mannequin. After returning to the beach, both team members had to carry the mannequin to a member of a rescue team.
- The three pieces formed a large domino with the word "CALLE" and eight pips sending teams to Domino Park on Calle Ocho. There, teams were given their next clue, sending them to Ice Palace Films Studios. At the studio, teams had to assemble large puzzle pieces that spelled out "AMAZING RACE!". Teams then had to attach a corresponding image to each letter, depicting an image from each leg of the race in order, and arrange signs indicating the twists in each episode in the order they were encountered to receive their final clue sending them to the finish line: LoanDepot Park, the home of the Miami Marlins. The correct answers were:

Correct answers
Leg	Letter	Image	Twist
1	A	Tian Tan Buddha	Fork in the Road
2	M	Taiko drummers	Intersection
3	A	Kemari	Express Pass
4	Z	Kuber Waterfall	Driver's Seat
5	I	Surfboards	Live Double U-Turn
6	N	Dubai Desert Conservation Reserve	Fast Forward
7	G	Kukeri dancers	Double U-Turn
8	R	Horo dancers	Express Pass
9	A	Il Capitano	Non-Elimination Leg
10	C	Cathédrale Notre-Dame de Strasbourg	Head-to-Head
11	E	Ferdinand Magellan	Valet Roulette
12	!	Domino	Scramble

Additional note

- Production of this leg was paused for multiple days shortly after the initial Cigarette boat ride due to the June 2024 South Florida floods.

== Production ==
=== Development and filming ===
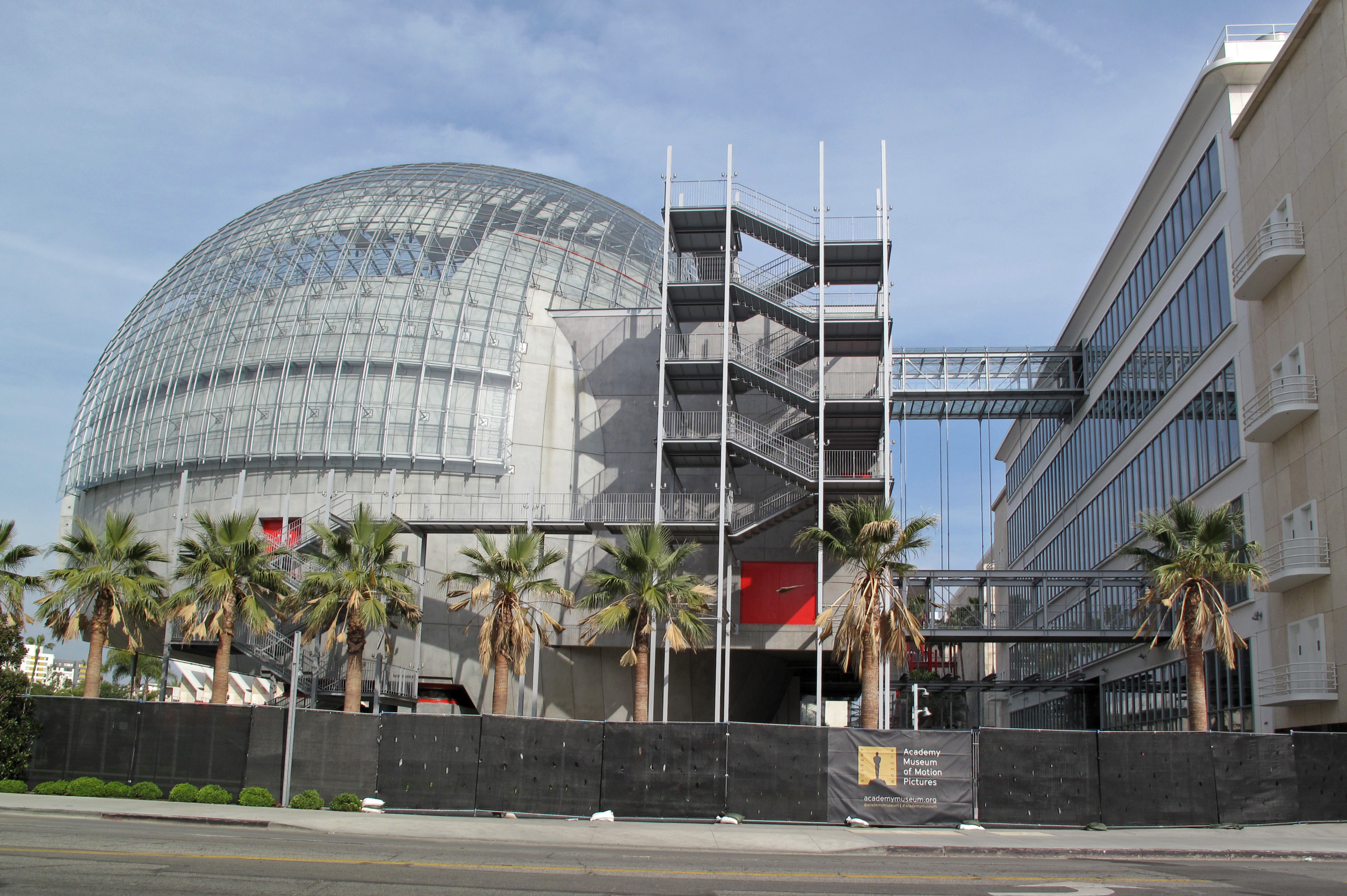
Teams began their race around the world at the Academy Museum of Motion Pictures in Los Angeles.

On May 2, 2024, the show was renewed for its 37th season with CBS Entertainment President Amy Reisenbach teasing a potential new twist for the show. In an interview before the finale of Season 36, Phil Keoghan stated, "We know the audience loves the airports; we know the audience loves mixing things up. We know that the audience loves going to new places, like Slovenia in Season 35. We got so much great feedback about Slovenia, so expect to see some new destinations, and also trying some new things."

Filming for this season began on May 18, 2024, at the Academy Museum of Motion Pictures in Los Angeles with teams then flying to Hong Kong. On May 21, teams left Hong Kong for Osaka, Japan. On June 10, a leg was filmed in Northern Portugal. Filming concluded on June 14 in Miami, which coincided with the June 2024 South Florida floods that caused a multi-day delay in filming of the final leg. This season also included visits to Dubai, United Arab Emirates, and Strasbourg, France, as well as a first-time visit to Bulgaria. In total, the season featured nine countries across 29,000 miles (47,000 km).

In August 2024, Keoghan stated in an interview, "We wanted to do a season where there were a few surprise elements, so I guess that's what I would say would summarize what we did. There's just some things that come [out] of left field for the contestants and I think the viewers will find it fun. Not necessarily new twists but just surprises."

This season was dubbed the "Season of Surprises" by CBS, with every episode featuring a "game-changing twist". These twists included longstanding staples of the show such as the Fast Forward (last seen in season 29) and U-Turn. In a new twist called the "Fork in the Road" during the first leg in Hong Kong, teams chose one of two race routes to the Pit Stop and one team on each route was eliminated at the end of the leg. The Intersection returned for the first time since season 16 during the second leg. Teams had a chance to win an Express Pass during the third and eighth legs. The fourth leg also introduced a new twist called the Driver's Seat, where one team gained the power to determine how much work racers had to perform during the Roadblock. The fifth leg saw the return of the U-Turn Vote, this time in public as in season 31 rather than in private. The seventh leg included the first standard Double U-Turn since season 32. The ninth leg featured the first planned non-elimination leg since season 33. The tenth leg had the first instance of the Head-to-Head since season 31; however, the Head-to-Head was placed at a Roadblock in the middle of the leg rather than just before the Pit Stop as in previous appearances. The eleventh leg introduced a new twist called Valet Roulette, where teams had to blindly choose either a manual or automatic car. The final leg featured a Scramble.

The final episode was dedicated to Jack Walworth, a longstanding producer of The Amazing Race since 2006, following his death.

=== Casting ===
Casting for the season began on December 4, 2023.

=== Release ===
==== Broadcast ====
In May 2024, CBS announced that the thirty-seventh season would air in 2025 on Wednesday nights alongside Survivor 48 with 90-minute episodes. On November 13, 2024, CBS announced that the season's premiere date as March 5, 2025.

==== Marketing ====
The first episode of this season was screened at SCAD TVfest in Atlanta during a panel with Phil Keoghan, Han & Holden, and Nick & Mike on February 5, 2025. The first trailer for this season was released on February 19, 2025.

== Reception ==
=== Critical response ===
The Amazing Race 37 received positive reviews with praise directed at the season of surprises theming. Andy Dehnart of reality blurred called it "a very strong and entertaining Amazing Race season." Madalyn Carter of Collider wrote that "Season 37 of The Amazing Race is already being regarded as one of the best seasons of the iconic globe-trotting series yet, with many fans noting how this season feels like the old-school The Amazing Race that they initially fell in love with." Sakshi Singh of FandomWire wrote that this season brought back the thrill present within older seasons. Gouri Maheshwari of Soap Central wrote "The Amazing Race's 37th season has already established itself as one of the most exciting in the program's history. Dustin Rowles of Pajiba wrote, "I'd be remiss if I didn't acknowledge what a terrific season this was. Season 37, unlike the last couple of cycles, didn't feel like 60-minute episodes stretched to 90; it was clearly designed for that longer runtime. And it worked. The pacing felt organic, and the cast was fantastic."

=== Reception of Jonathan Towns ===
The season did face criticism for Jonathan's treatment towards his wife, Ana. Jonathan himself addressed his behavior towards Ana on their YouTube channel, acknowledging that his behavior was inexcusable. He further clarified that he was diagnosed with autism spectrum disorder after filming. On March 4, 2026, the Towns filed a defamation lawsuit against Paramount, CBS, ABC Signature, and Jerry Bruckheimer Films for their depiction on the season seeking $8 million, a re-edit of the season with disclaimers of Jonathan's autism diagnosis, and a public apology.

=== Ratings ===
Viewership and ratings per episode of The Amazing Race 37
No.	Title	Air date	Rating (18–49)	Viewers (millions)	DVR (18–49)	DVR viewers (millions)	Total (18–49)	Total viewers (millions)	Ref.
1	"Double the Stakes, Double the Eliminations"	March 5, 2025	0.3/5	2.62	0.3	1.58	0.6	4.20	
2	"Very Strong Warrior Energy"	March 12, 2025	0.3/5	2.56	0.2	1.45	0.5	4.01	
3	"Chaotic, Crazy, That's What We're Used To"	March 19, 2025	0.4/6	2.67	0.2	1.43	0.7	4.10	
4	"There's No Addresses in the Jungle"	March 26, 2025	0.3/4	2.48	0.2	1.47	0.5	3.94	
5	"It's Not Personal, It's Business"	April 2, 2025	0.3/5	2.53	TBD	TBD	TBD	TBD	
6	"It Smells Like the Desert"	April 9, 2025	0.4/5	2.65	TBD	TBD	TBD	TBD	
7	"Be One With the Hay"	April 16, 2025	0.3/4	2.59	TBD	TBD	TBD	TBD	
8	"We're Letting Race Brain Win"	April 23, 2025	0.3/4	2.44	TBD	TBD	TBD	TBD	
9	"The Pizza de Résistance"	April 30, 2025	0.3/4	2.68	TBD	TBD	TBD	TBD	
10	"Up the River Without a Joust"	May 7, 2025	0.3/4	2.57	TBD	TBD	TBD	TBD	
11	"My Knight in Shining Armor"	May 14, 2025	0.3/4	2.51	TBD	TBD	TBD	TBD	
12	"We're in Miami Baby!"	May 15, 2025	0.3/4	2.82	TBD	TBD	TBD	TBD	

== Works cited ==
- Castro, Adam-Troy (2006). My Ox Is Broken!. BenBella Books. ISBN 978-1-932100-91-4.
