= Anak Agung Gde Sobrat =

Indonesian painter (1912 - 1992)

- Born: 1912; Padangtegal, Ubud
- Died: 1992 (aged 79–80)
- Known for: Painter

Anak Agung Gde Sobrat (1912–1992) was a painter in Indonesia.

== Biography ==
=== Early life ===
Sobrat was the son of an aristocratic family from the town of Padangtegal in Ubud. Prior to World War II, he was also known as I Dewa Sobrat. As a child, he was exposed to various forms of art such as shadow puppet performances and sacred dances at the village's temples. He learned to make shadow puppets from his grandfather. This became the basis for his skillful depiction of the Ramayana and Mahabharata in his early paintings.

=== Influence of Walter Spies ===
Sobrat and his neighbor Anak Agung Gde Meregeg were the first two artists in Padangtegal to meet Walter Spies, at the end of the 1920s. Spies was a German artist who together with Rudolf Bonnet was thought to be the agent of change for the modernization of Balinese art. Sobrat worked and lived with Spies for a year. Spies' influence can be seen in his early works, particularly those with split or double horizons. He learned western style painting from Spies and Rudolf Bonnet. In the early 1930s, Bonnet considered him to be the most talented Balinese artist of the period for his drawing skill, color composition and his versatility. It is from Bonnet that he learned portraiture.

From 1957 and 1959 Sobrat taught at the Academy of Fine Arts in Yogyakarta.

== Works ==
In his early career, before 1930, Sobrat produced mainly Wayang (shadow style) paintings. Some of his early works can be found in the Museum Puri Lukisan in Ubud, Bali, Indonesia. Sobrat produced many portraits, mostly of his daughter.

== Reception ==
Bonnet once wrote that Anak Agung Gde Sobrat was the most talented artist in Bali. His works can be found in several museums throughout the world: Bali Museum; Museum Puri Lukisan - Ubud, Bali; Rijksmuseum voor Volkenkunde - Leiden; and Tropenmuseum - Amsterdam. In Bali, his pre-war and modern works can be viewed at the Puri Lukisan Museum.
