= Great Temple =

Great Temple is a general name for the most prominent temple of an ancient city. It may refer to:

- Great Temple of Abu Simbel
- Great Temple of Abydos
- Great Temple of the Aten
- Great Temple at Karnak
- Great Temples of Nanto (Nara)
- Great Temple (Petra)
- Great Temple of Ptah
- Great Temple of Templo Mayor
- Padangtegal Great Temple of Death
