= Monkey Forest =

Monkey Forest may refer to:

- Ubud Monkey Forest, Bali, Indonesia
- Trentham Monkey Forest, Staffordshire, England
