= Konkaikōmyō-ji =

Buddhist temple in Kyoto, Japan

Kurodani Konkaikōmyōji くろ谷 金戒光明寺
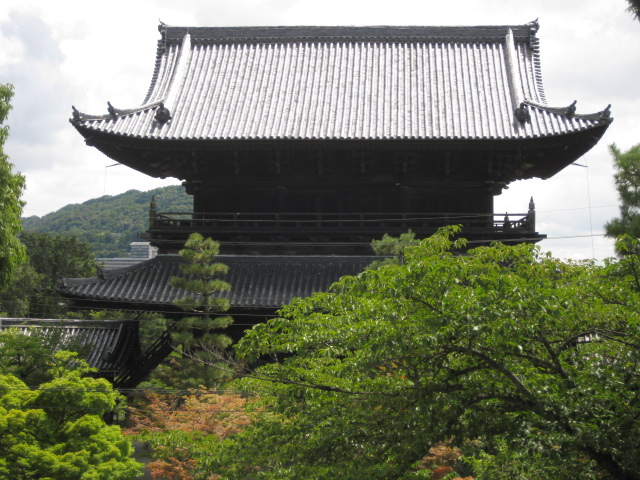
- Konkaikōmyōji (Kurodani Temple)

Religion
- Affiliation: Jōdo-shū
- Deity: Amitābha

Location
- Location: 121, Kurodani-cho, Sakyo-ku, Kyoto
- Country: Japan
- Interactive map of Kurodani Konkaikōmyōji くろ谷 金戒光明寺
- Coordinates: 35°01′11″N 135°47′17″E

Architecture
- Founder: Hōnen
- Completed: 1175

Website
- http://www.kurodani.jp/

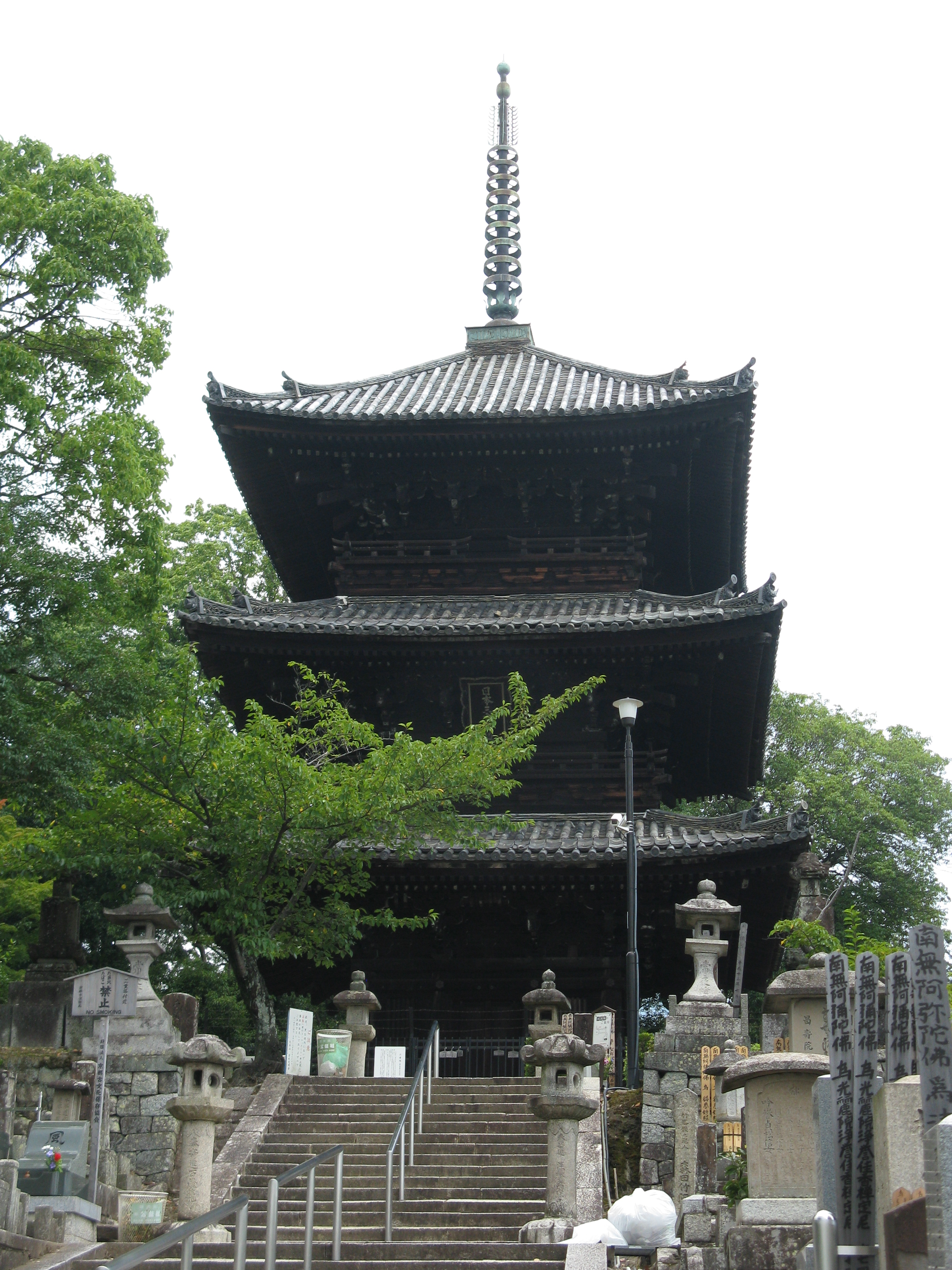

1890

Konkaikōmyōji (金戒光明寺), also the Kurodani Temple, is a Buddhist temple in Kyoto, Japan. Founded in 1175 by Honen, Kurodani Temple is one of four main temples of the Jōdo Sect in Kyoto, the others being Chion-ji, Chion-in, and Seijoka-in. It is also one of the seven main temples of the Jodo sect and belongs to the Chinzei sect of the Jodo sect. It main principal image is the Amida Buddha. The temple served as the headquarters of Matsudaira Katamori during the late Edo period.

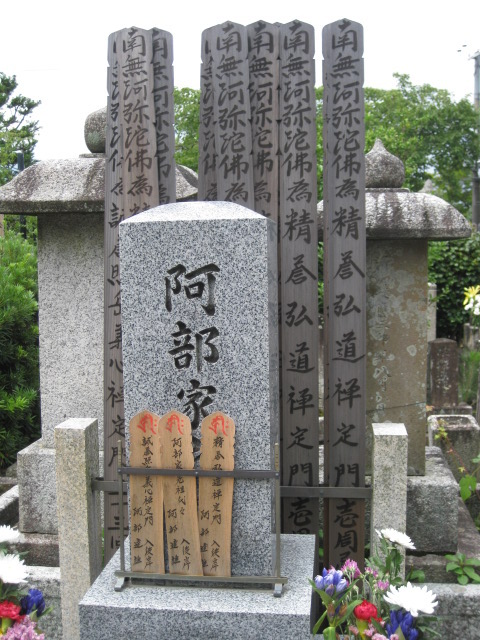
Grave in Konkaikōmyōji

== History ==
In 1175 at the age of 42, Honen left Mount Hiei, coming down from its Kurodani Valley to spread nembutsu in the city. Along the way he sat on a rock on a mountain and recited nembutsu, and saw purple clouds and the light of Amida covering the mountain, leading him to build a hermitage and the first Jōdo sect temple. This is also why the mountain is called Shiun-zan (紫雲山), meaning purple cloud mountain.

During the Kamakura period, the temple was a nembutsu practice center for the Jodo sect, and was passed on to Honen's disciple Shinku (1146–1228) after his death in 1212. The temple finished construction during the time of the fifth abbot, Egi, and was called Kōmyō-ji (光明寺). The eighth abbot, Unku, bestowed the Endon precepts (円頓戒) to Emperor Go-Kōgon, who in return bestowed the characters 金戒 ("Konkai") on the temple, changing it name to Konkaikōmyō-ji.

During the early Edo period, Tokugawa Ieyasu renovated the temple to resemble a castle to help station soldiers in Kyoto. In the late Edo period, Kurodani became the headquarters of Matsudaira Katamori where he stationed 1000 retainers after he was given the position of Governor of Kyoto. In 1863, a group of rōnin were granted an audience with Matsudaira, where they were ordered to maintain order in Kyoto, subsequently creating the Shinsengumi. The temple was chosen for its castle-like structure, its proximity to the imperial palace and Sanjo Ohashi Bridge, and its ability to accommodate 3000 soldiers. The graves of Aizu and Kuwana men who died at the Battle of Toba–Fushimi are located at this temple.

== Architecture ==
The oldest building in the complex, the Amida hall was rebuilt from the timbers of Hōkō-ji, in 1605 by Toyotomi Hideyori. Inside houses the principal deity Amida Buddha carved by Eshin.

The Sanmon was completed in 1860.
