= Ubud Monkey Forest =

Forest reserve in Bali, Indonesia

Coordinates: 8°31′7.76″S 115°15′30.18″E

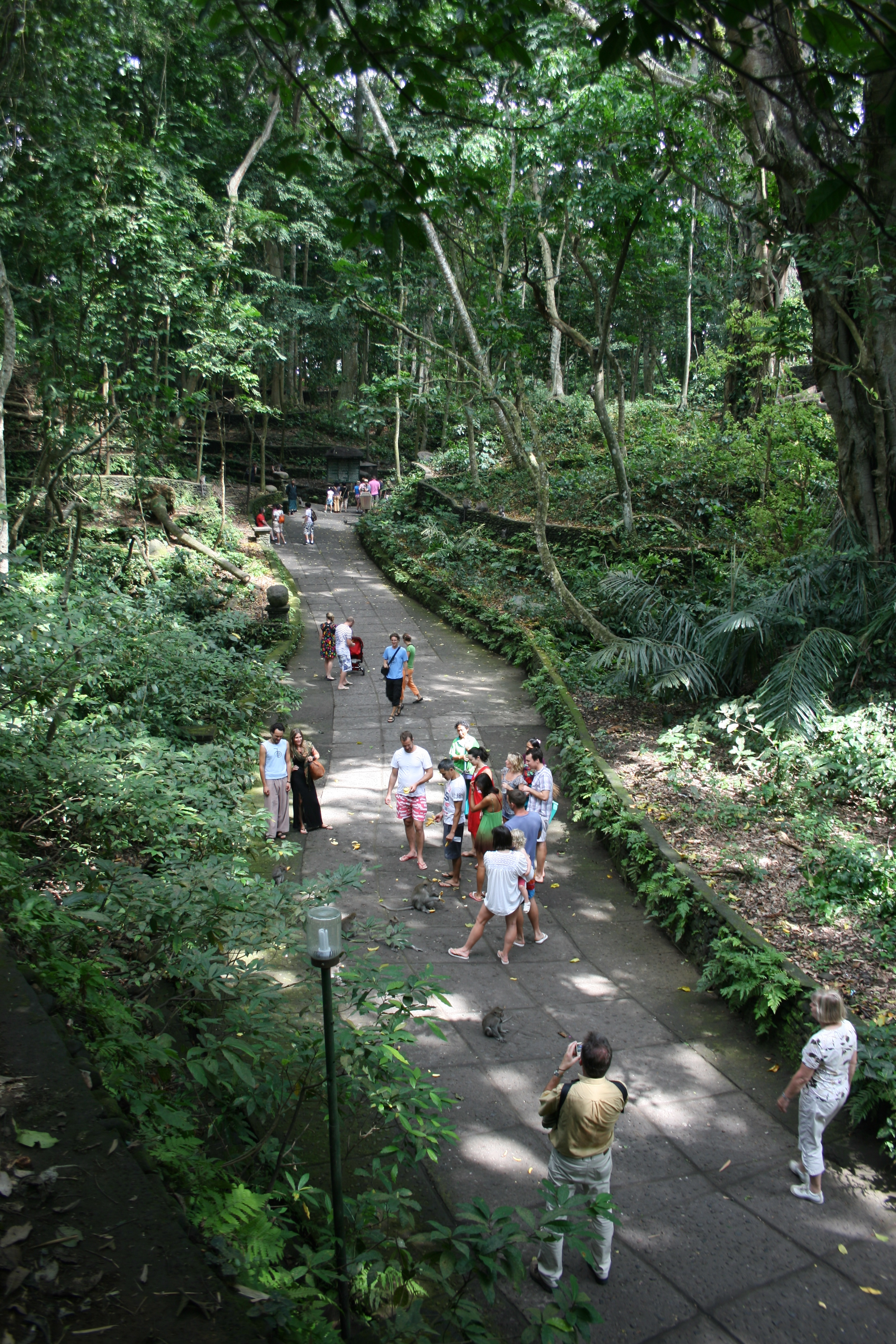
Visitors feeding monkeys in the Monkey Forest

A monkey eating corn at the Monkey Forest

Mandala Suci Wenara Wana, also known as Ubud Monkey Forest, is a sanctuary located in Padangtegal, Ubud, Bali, Indonesia. As of 2023, about 1,260 Balinese long-tailed macaque monkeys lived in the Ubud Monkey Forest.

The sanctuary is a popular tourist attraction. It includes numerous species of plants and trees as well as three temples and numerous visitor facilities. The forest lies within the village of Padangtegal and is managed by Mandala Suci Wenara Wana Management.

== Mission ==
The Ubud Monkey Forest describes its conservation mission according to the Hindu principle of tri hita karana ("three ways to reach spiritual and physical well-being"), which seeks to help people live harmoniously. The "three ways" to this goal are harmonious relationships between humans, with the natural environment, and with God. The forest also seeks to conserve rare plants and animals for use in Hindu rituals and to provide a natural laboratory for educational institutions, with a particular emphasis on research into the social interaction of the park's monkeys with one another as well as with their natural environment.

== Physical features and facilities ==
The Ubud Monkey Forest covers approximately 0.1 square kilometres (10 ha; 25 acres) and contains at least 115 different species of trees. The premises also include a public hall and gallery, an open stage, a canteen, a first aid center, a police post, a parking lot, and a composting facility.

=== Temples ===
The grounds are home to three Hindu temples, all apparently constructed around 1350:

- Pura Dalem Agung Padangtegal ("Padangtegal Great Temple of Death"), also known as the Main Temple, lies in the southwestern part of the park and is used for worshiping the god Hyang Widhi in the personification of Shiva.
- Pura Beji, or Beji Temple, in the northwestern part of the park, is used for the worship of Hyang Widhi in the personification of Gangga. A "Holy Spring" bathing temple, it is a place of spiritual and physical cleansing prior to religious ceremonies.
- Pura Prajapati, or Prajapati Temple, located in the northeastern part of the park, is used to worship Hyang Widhi in the personification of Prajapati. A cemetery adjacent to this temple receives the bodies of the deceased for temporary burial while they await a mass cremation ceremony, held once every five years.

The temples play an important role in the spiritual life of the local community, and the monkey and its mythology are important in the Balinese art tradition. The Monkey Forest area is sanctified by the local community, and some parts of it are not open to the public. Sacred areas of the temples are closed to everyone except those willing to pray and wear proper Balinese praying attire.

== Animals ==
=== Monkeys ===
In 2011, approximately 605 crab-eating macaques (Macaca fascicularis), known locally as the Balinese long-tailed monkey, lived in the Ubud Monkey Forest: 39 adult males, 38 male sub-adults, 194 adult females, 243 juveniles, and 91 infants. The park staff feeds them sweet potatoes three times a day, providing them with their main source of food. The monkeys also feed on papaya leaf, maize, cucumber, coconut, and other local fruit. Although bananas were once for sale in the park for tourists wishing to feed the monkeys, this led to obesity among the animals, and the practice was discontinued. In addition, visitors are prohibited from feeding the monkeys snacks such as peanuts, cookies, biscuits, and bread.

There are five groups of monkeys in the park, each occupying different territories: one group inhabits the area in front of the main temple, another the park's Michelin area, a third the eastern area, and a fourth the central area, while the fifth group lives in the cremation and cemetery area. Conflicts between the groups are unavoidable: for example, groups must pass through one another's territory to reach the stream during the dry season, and increasing population pressures are bringing the groups into more frequent contact.

The monkeys rest at night and are most active during the day, which brings them into constant contact with humans visiting during the park's business hours. Visitors can observe their daily activities—mating, fighting, grooming, and caring for their young—at close range and even sit next to them along the park's paths.

The monkeys have lost their fear of humans. Generally, they will not approach people who they believe are not offering food, but they invariably approach visitors in groups and grab any bags containing food. They may also reach into visitors' bags and trouser pockets in search of food or even climb on visitors.

Park staff advise visitors never to pull back an offer of food to a monkey or to touch one, as either action can prompt an aggressive response by the animal, and they have been known to bite people. Park personnel carry slingshots with which to intimidate aggressive monkeys and intervene quickly in confrontations between monkeys and humans.

=== Timor rusa deer ===
The Ubud Monkey Forest contains a fenced enclosure for a small herd of Timor rusa (Rusa timorensis timorensis), a type of deer native to the island of Timor.

== Management ==
The Ubud Monkey Forest is owned by the village of Padangtegal, and village members serve on the sanctuary's governing council. The village's residents view it as an important spiritual, economic, educational, and conservation center.

== Gallery ==
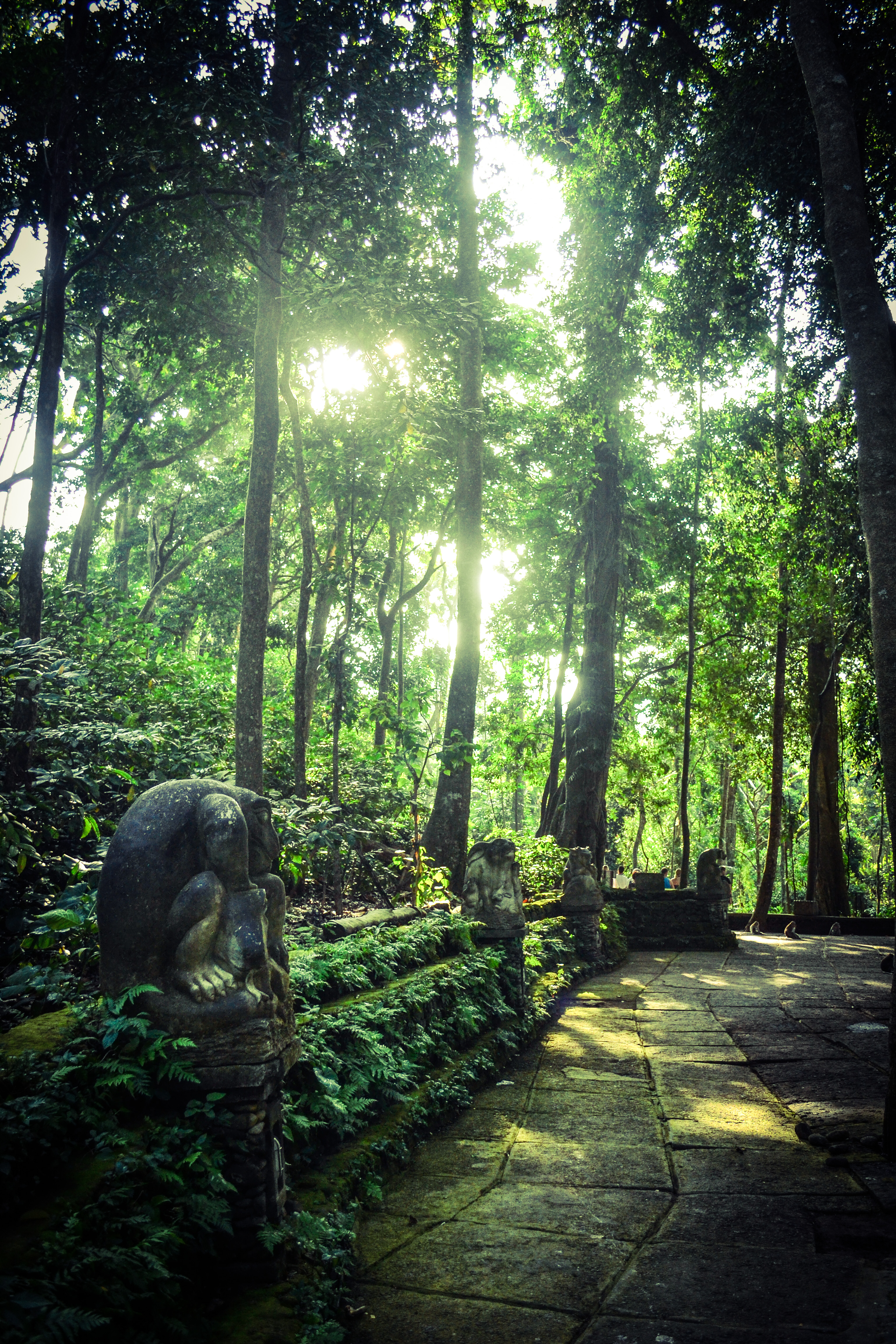
Ubud Monkey Forest

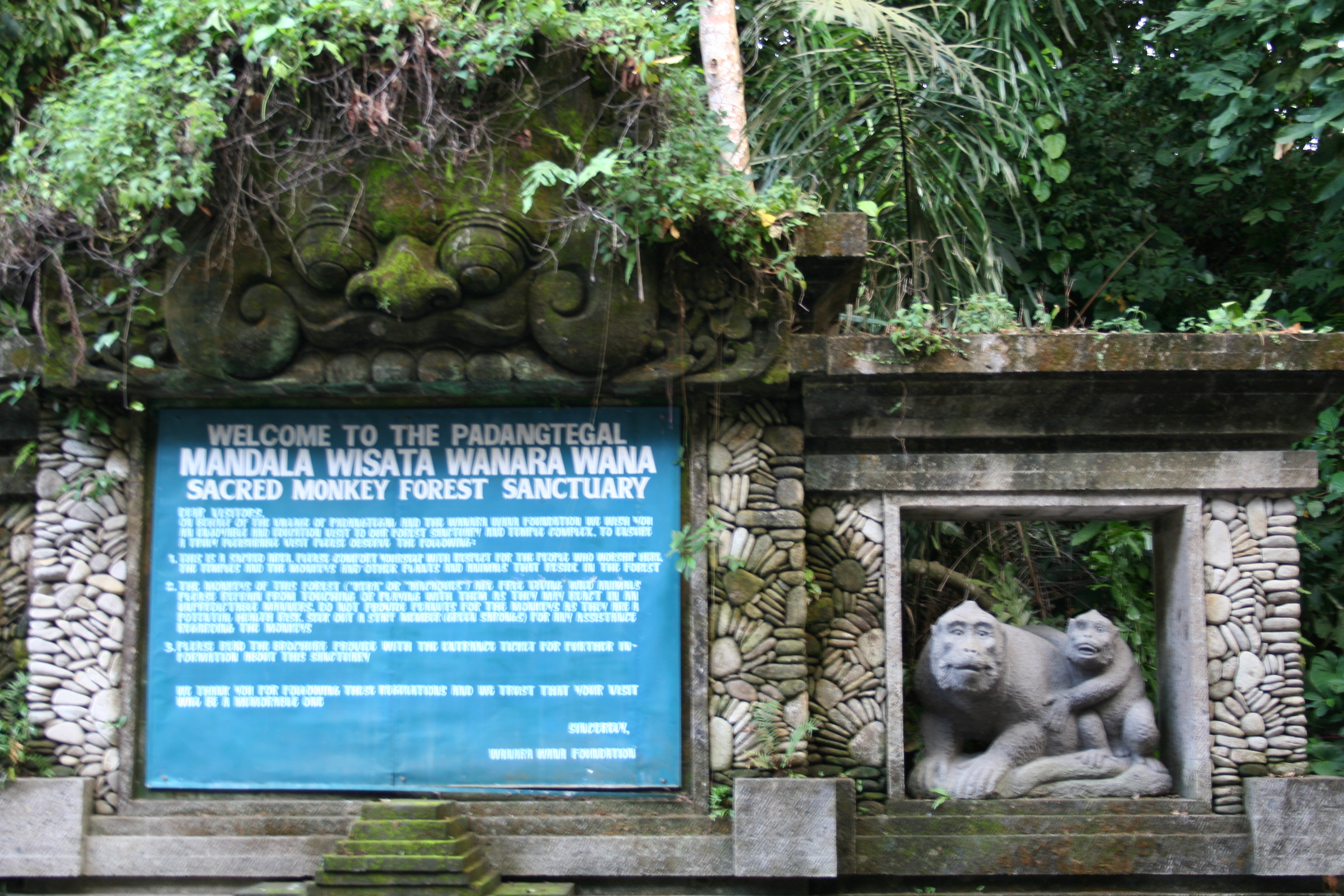
Welcome sign showing the park's full name.

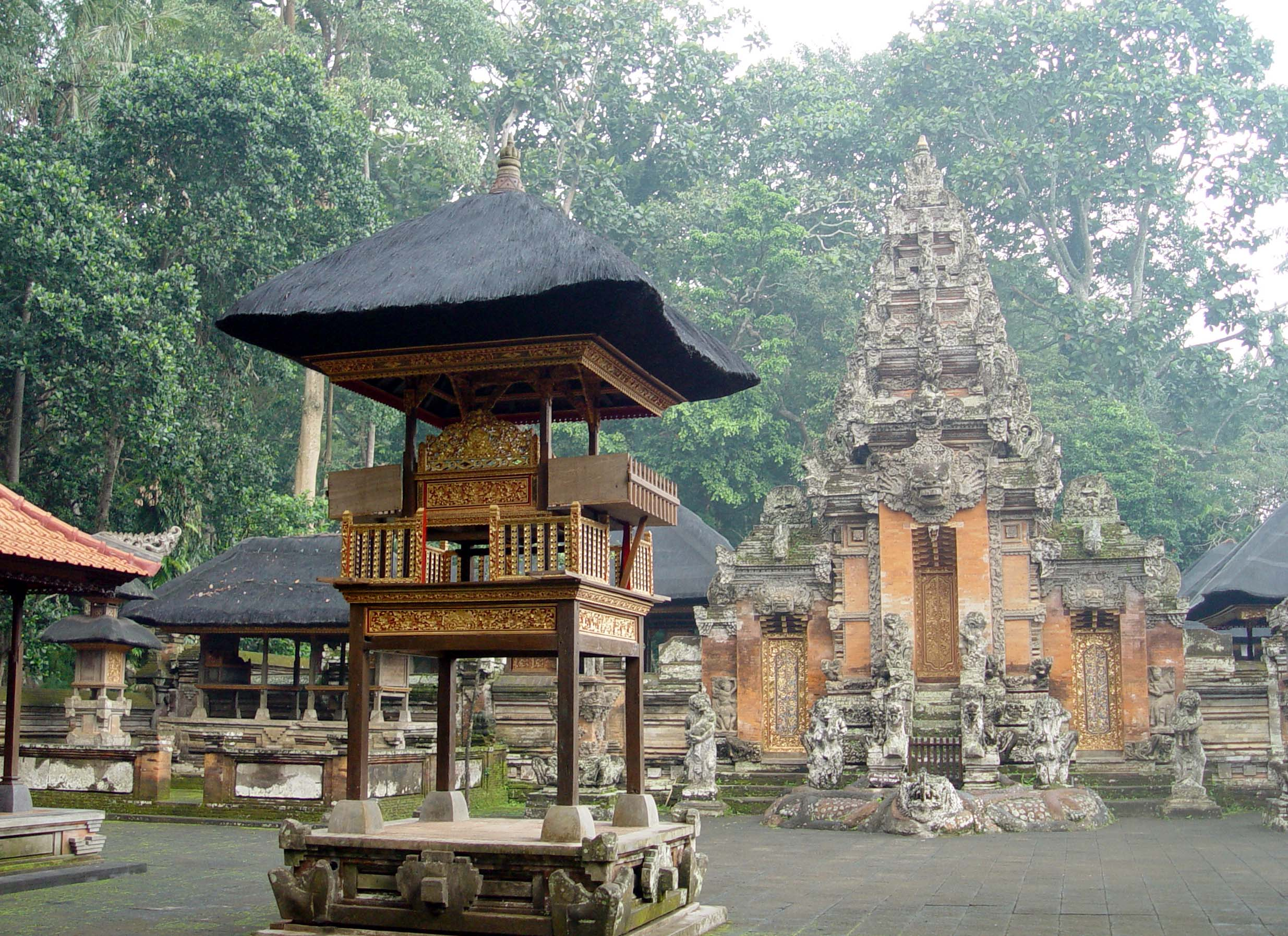
Dalem Agung Padangtegal Temple, Ubud Monkey Forest, Ubud

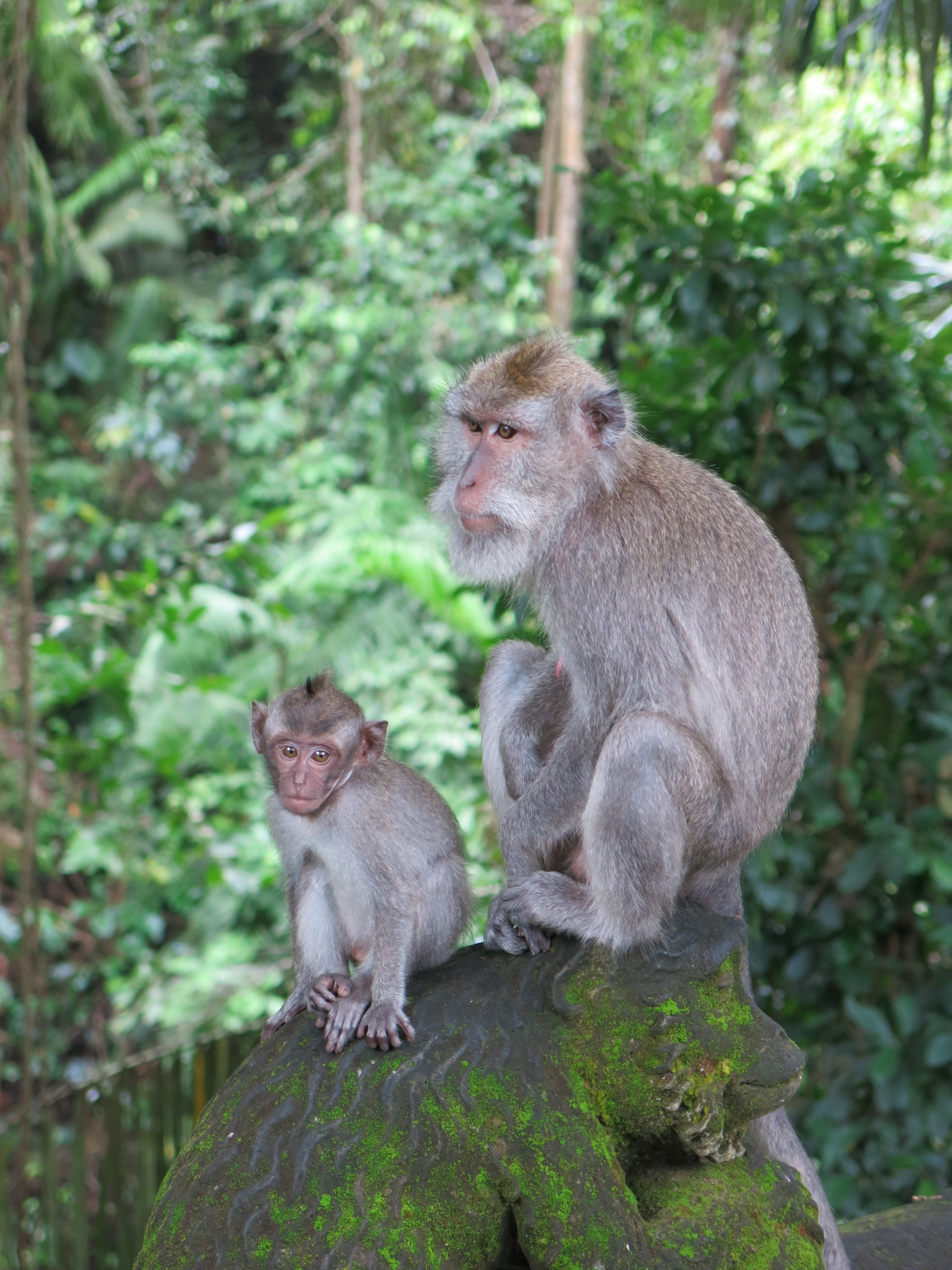
Mother and child in the Ubud Monkey Forest.

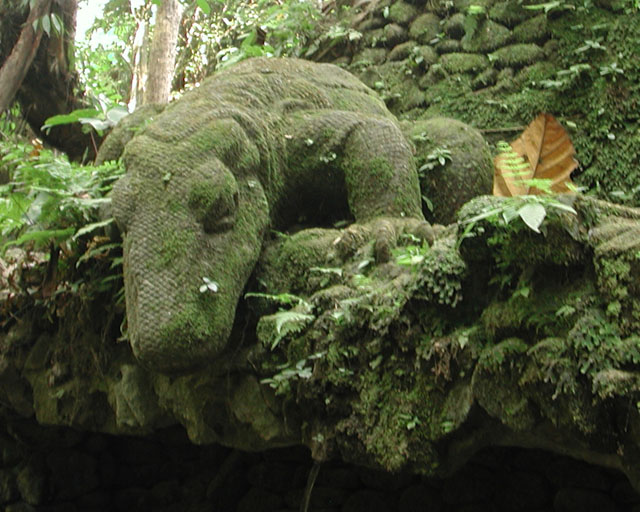
Statue of a Komodo dragon in the Ubud Monkey Forest.

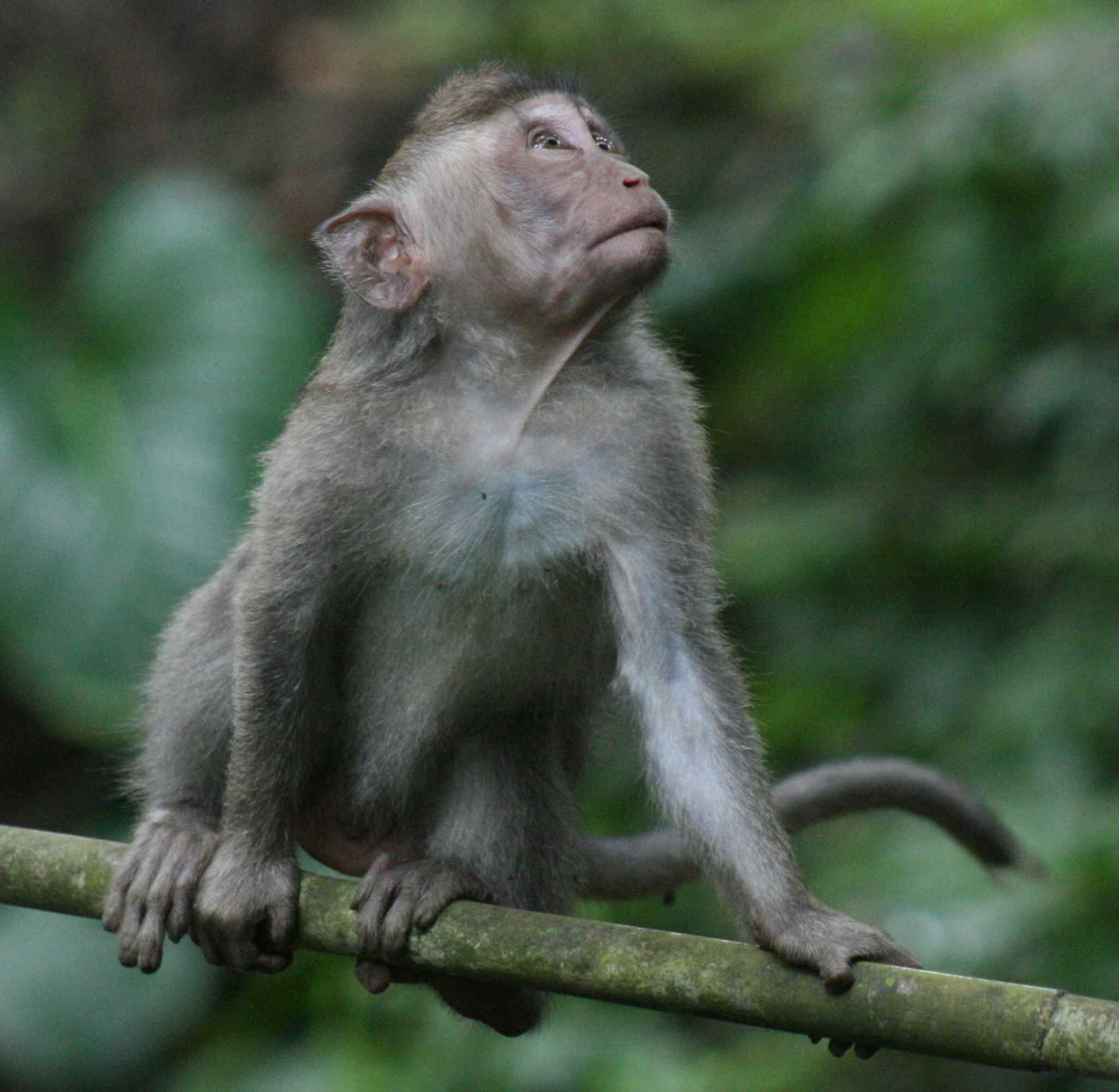
A crab-eating macaque in the Ubud Monkey Forest.

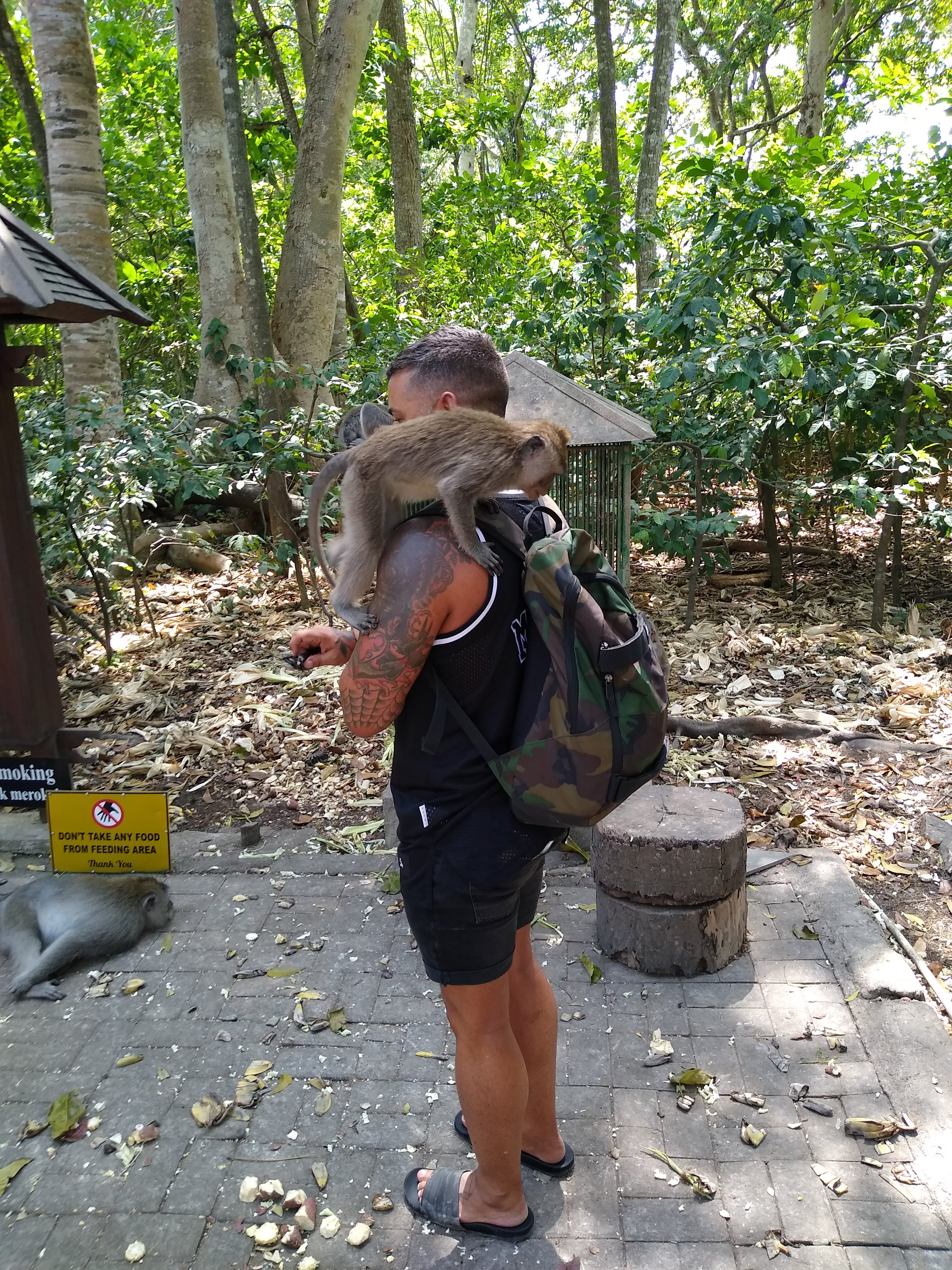
A monkey climbs on a tourist in the Ubud Monkey Forest.
