= Pura Dalem Agung Padangtegal =

Hindu temple in Bali, Indonesia

- Pura Dalem Agung Padangtegal ᬧᬸᬭᬤᬍᬫ᭄ᬅᬕᬸᬂᬧᬤᬗ᭄ᬢᭂᬕᬮ᭄
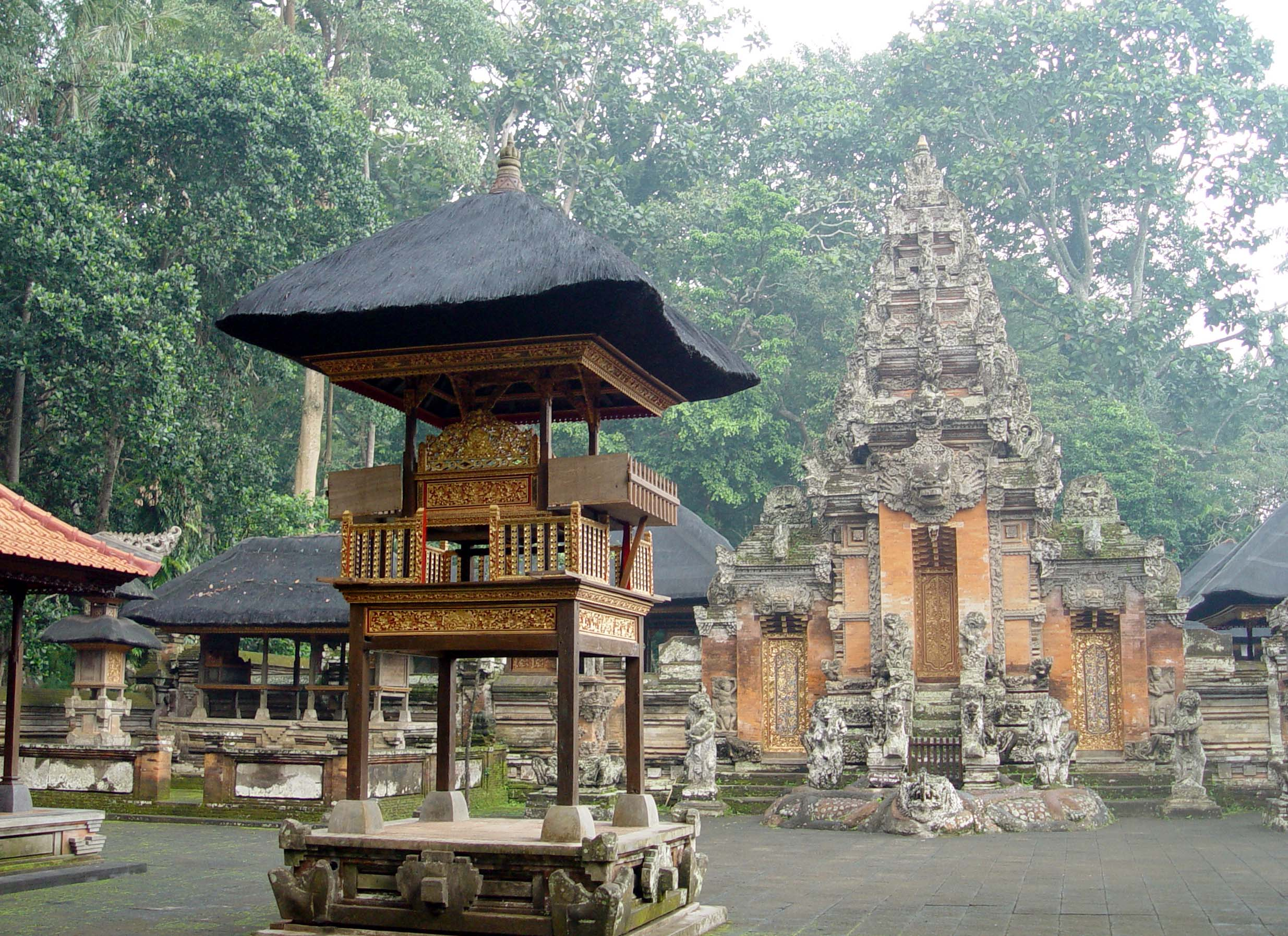

- Location within Bali

Religion
- Affiliation: Hinduism

Location
- Location: Ubud, Bali, Indonesia
- Coordinates: 8°31′08″S 115°15′30″E

Pura Dalem Agung Padangtegal (Balinese script: ᬧᬸᬭᬤᬍᬫ᭄ᬅᬕᬸᬂᬧᬤᬗ᭄ᬢᭂᬕᬮ᭄), or Padangtegal Great Temple of Death, is one of three Hindu temples making up a temple complex located in the Sacred Monkey Forest Sanctuary – commonly called the "Ubud Monkey Forest" – of Padangtegal, Ubud, Bali, Indonesia.

Also called the "Main Temple," Pura Dalem Agung Padangtegal lies in the southwestern part of the Ubud Monkey Forest grounds and is used for worshiping the god Hyang Widhi in personification of Shiva, the Recycler or Transformer. Like the other two temples in the complex, it is thought to have been built around 1350. The temple complex plays an important role in the spiritual life of the local community.

The area in front of the temple is the home territory of one of the Ubud Monkey Forest's five groups of crab-eating macaques.

== See also ==
- Hinduism in India
- List of Hindu temples in Indonesia
