= Padangtegal =

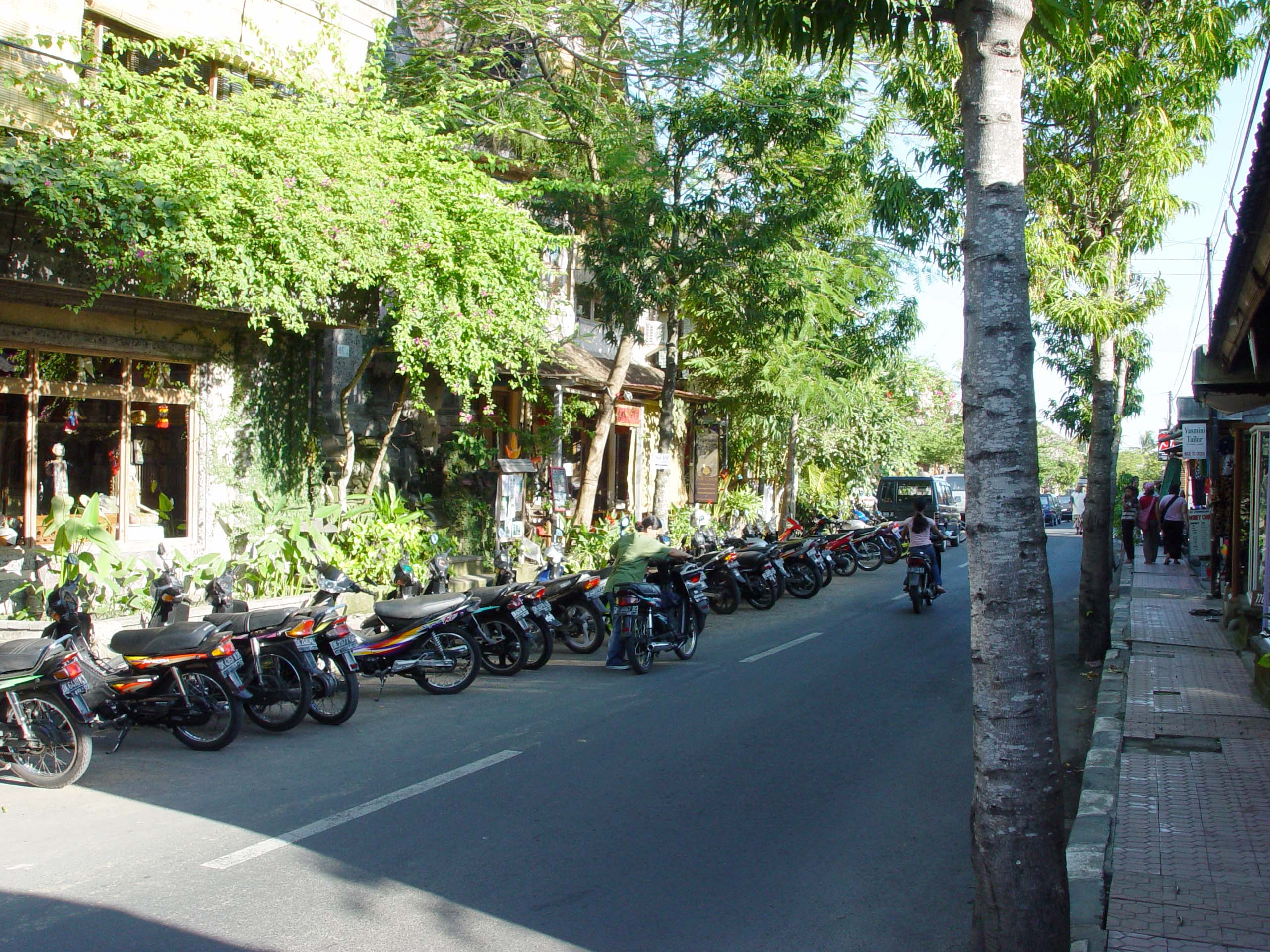
- Jalan Hanoman, the main street in Padangtegal

- Location in Bali
- Coordinates: 8°30′50″S 115°15′50″E
- Country: Indonesia
- Province: Bali
- Regency: Gianyar
- Time zone: UTC+8 (Central Indonesia Time)

Padangtegal is a village in Ubud, Bali, Indonesia. It is the home to the Ubud Monkey Forest which contains the Pura Dalem Agung Padangtegal temple as well as a "Holy Spring" bathing temple and another temple used for cremation ceremonies.

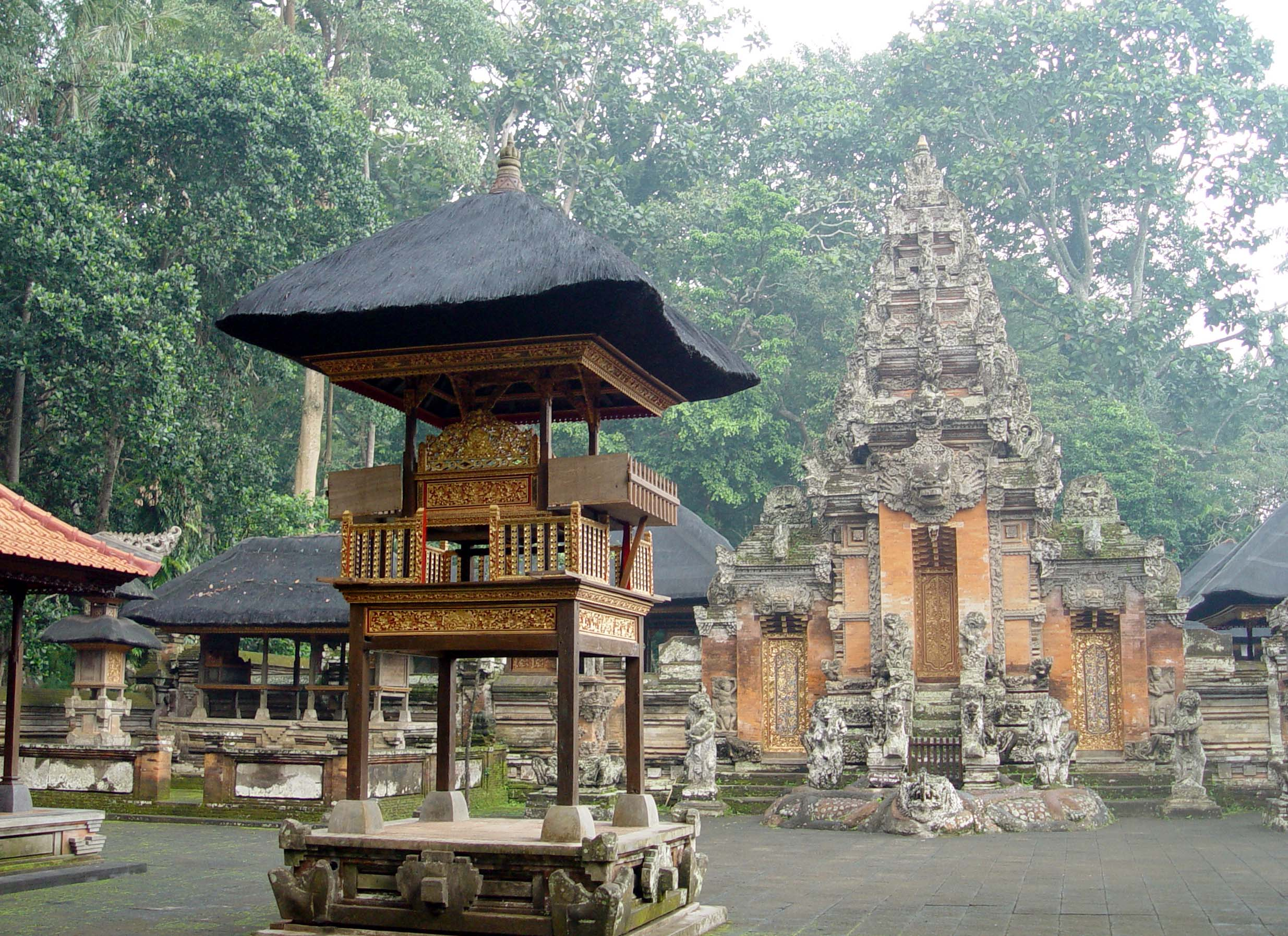
Dalem Agung Padantegal Temple, Sacred Monkey Forest, Ubud
