= Mooi Indië =

Painting movement

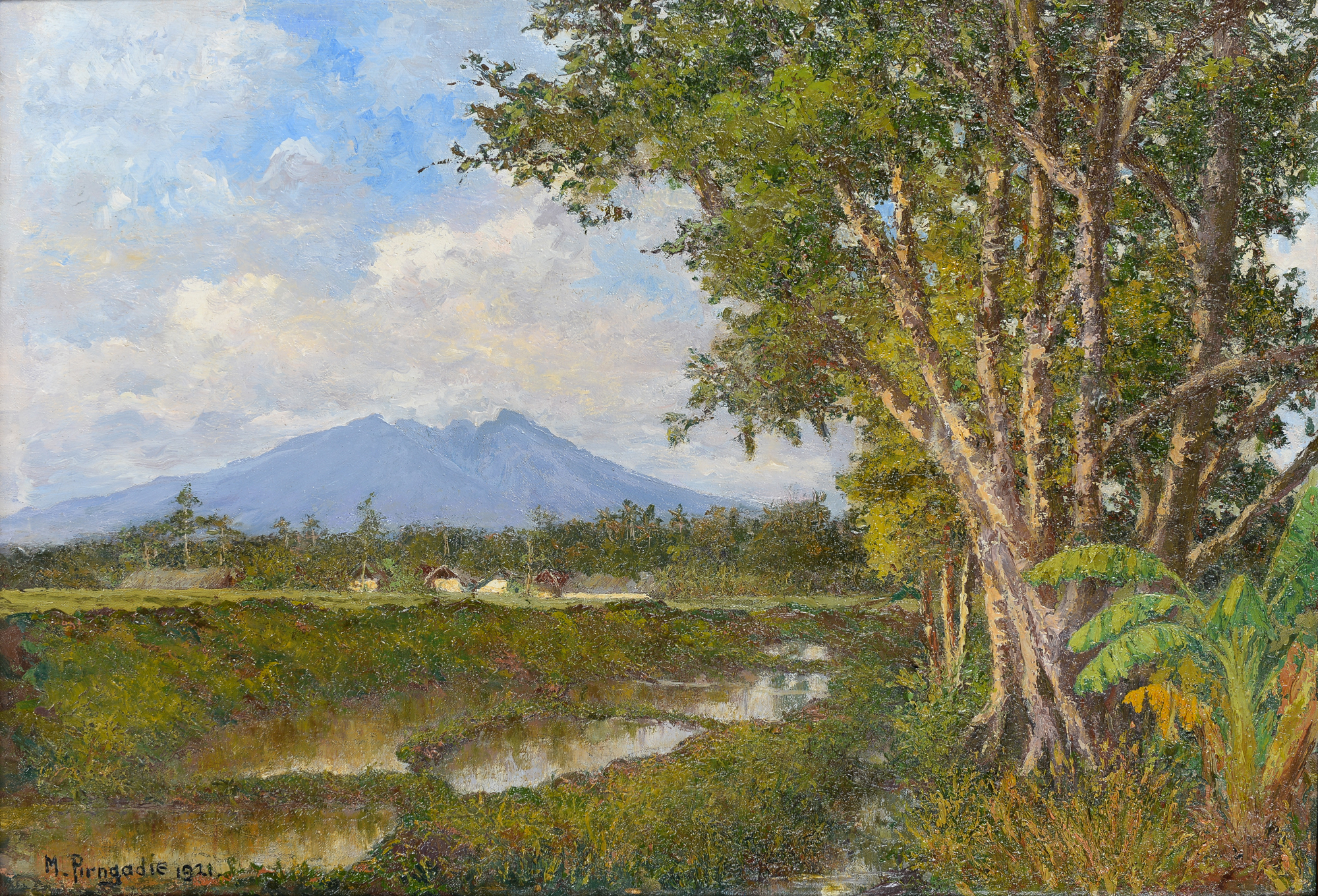
Indonesian Landscape (Pirngadi, 1921)

Mooi Indië ([ˈmoːi̯ ˈɪnˌdi.ə]; lit. 'Beautiful Indies') was a painting movement that emerged in the Dutch East Indies (now Indonesia) in the early 20th century. Found predominantly in landscape painting and drawing heavily from Romanticism, the movement emerged in the context of growing interest in the visual arts as well as a lucrative market for Orientalist depictions of the exotic peoples and places of the archipelago. Artists included persons of European heritage, such as Wim Dooijewaard, Fredericus van Rossum du Chattel, and Ernest Dezentjé, as well as indigenous painters such as Abdullah Suriosubroto, Pirngadi, and Wakidi.

Works classified as Mooi Indië emphasize beauty and aesthetics, and often depict landscapes with mountains, rice paddies, palm trees, beaches, and rural people. Perspective and composition draw from the prescriptions of academic art as taught in the Netherlands in the early 20th century. The combination of stereotyped subject matter, application of academic principles, and emphasis on aesthetic beauty in works identified as Mooi Indië was criticized by some as highly formulaic; the Indonesian artist S. Sudjojono urged his contemporaries to break away and develop their own forms.

== History ==
Historically, colonial society in the Dutch East Indies (now Indonesia) placed a low priority on art. In the 19th century, painters of European origin began to arrive in the archipelago. Some were hired by the colonial government for documentation purposes, with the Belgian artist Antoine Payen the Younger tasked in 1816 with accurately portraying the Javanese landscape. Others were drawn to the unique and exotic landscapes in the archipelago, or born in the colony. During this period, Raden Saleh—considered the first modern Indonesian painter—learned Western art under the painters Cornelis Kruseman and Andreas Schelfhout. (Note: Yuliman (2023, p. 111) excludes Raden Saleh from the Mooi Indië movement, based both on his lack of contemporaries as well as stylistic differences.)

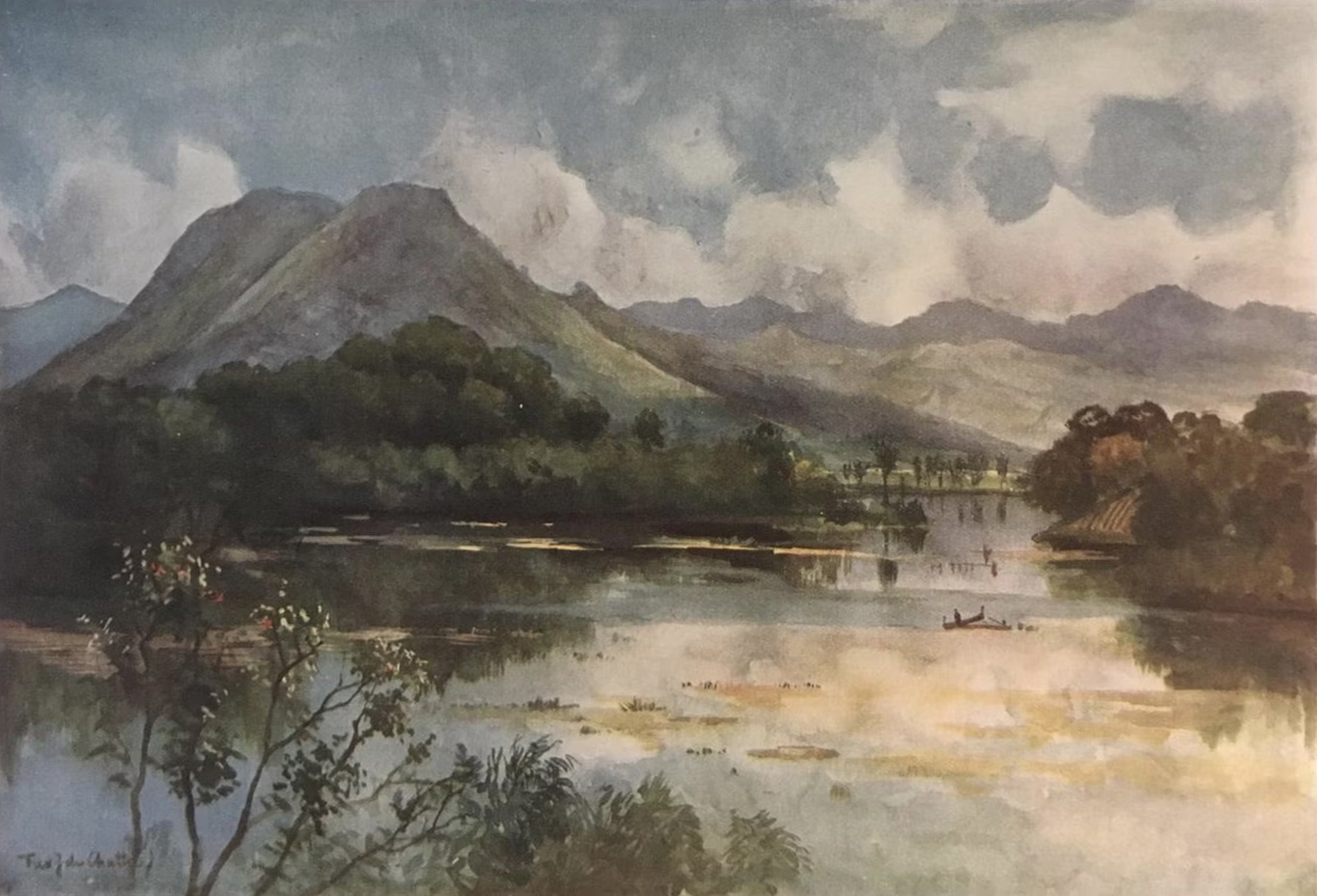
Indonesian Landscape (Fredericus van Rossum du Chattel, undated), from the book Mooi Indië (1913)

In the early 20th century, technological developments and a growing European population resulted in greater interest in the visual arts. The Netherlands Indies Art Society was established in 1902, and in 1914 it opened its own building. At the same time, formal art education was sparse, and those who had received an education in the field had generally apprenticed to established artists. Exhibitions were at first limited entirely to artists of European descent, with works by indigenous painters only included in exhibitions in the 1930s. Such exhibitions were commonly held in hotel lobbies, shops, and Freemason lodges.

Market forces, driven in part by an Orientalist fascination with the Indies, resulted in landscapes and depictions of indigenous peoples becoming lucrative. Such works could be sold as souvenirs or kept by returning European officials as mementos of their time in the Indies. Such landscapes, according to the American art historian Claire Holt, served as "catalysts for their nostalgia". The market was thus driven by civil servants, merchants, tourists, and traders, as well as by the educated indigenous upper class. The term Mooi Indië ('Beautiful Indies') was used to describe the collective body of works produced in the Indies as early as 1913, when watercolours by Fredericus van Rossum du Chattel were compiled and published as Mooi Indië – Afbeeldingen in Kleuren van Twaalf Aquarellen (Beautiful Indies – Illustrations of Twelve Watercolours).

Against this background, almost all artists active in the region presented the Indies through a Romantic lens. (Note: As exceptions, Brakel (2009, p. 53) identifies Piet Ouborg, Dolf Breetvelt, and Anita Rambonnet-Daponte.) The Dutch art critic Koos van Brakel divides the European artists into two groups: those who "repeated the same themes endlessly" and those who depicted the beauty of the Indies using techniques drawn from contemporary European art trends; in the latter category, he includes artists such as Wim Dooijewaard as well as transients such as Isaac Israëls. Many European artists, including W. O. J. Nieuwenkamp, Dooijewaard, and Roland Strasser, focused on Bali, which was presented as a "paradise island not yet affected by modern civilisation".

Several contemporary indigenous artists also painted in the Romantic style, most prominently Abdullah Suriosubroto, Pirngadi, and Wakidi. Such artists were generally descended from the nobility, who were better able to send their children to European-style schools. Only Abdullah Suriosubroto received formal training in the Netherlands; Pirngadi and Wakidi apprenticed under European artists in the Indies. Abdullah, Pirngadi, and Wakidi all took students, with Abdullah's—including his son Basuki—continuing to employ the style of their teacher.

== Art ==
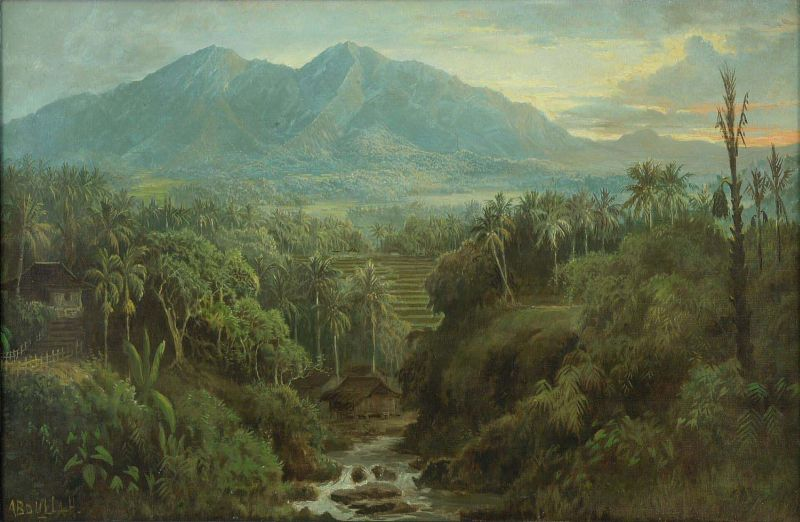
Priangan (Abdullah Suriosubroto, undated)

Works identified with the Mooi Indië movement are predominantly landscape paintings, though portraits of beautiful women and depictions of traditional rituals were also noted. In landscapes, verisimilitude was secondary to aesthetics; trees, shrubs, and other features could be moved or removed when artists deemed it necessary. The painter Gerard Pieter Adolfs described himself and his contemporaries as having "in them the ability to portray what is beautiful, good and healthy".

In technique, works identified with the Mooi Indië movement tend to follow the prescriptions of academic art as taught in the Netherlands. Perspective was determined carefully, and composition involved a clearly delineated foreground, middle ground, and background. Subjects were primarily rural landscapes, generally featuring mountains, rice paddies, palm trees, and/or beaches, with human figures including rural indigenous men and women.

Use of clean colours and bright lighting was emphasized, as was careful application that avoided blending on the canvas. Regarding his use of colour, Pirngadi is quoted:

When you depict a cloud, use white, ochre and mix in a little vermillion. Then the shadows are those colours with blue added. To show the water of a rice field, use these colours with a little more ochre and blue. Ochre is the key colour. Avoid using black and white.

In responding to modern art, artists identified with the Mooi Indië movement were negative. The painter Henry van Velthuysen dismissed modern art, describing works by Jan Frank as "arous[ing] the impression of being infantile construction-kit shapes". Similarly, Adolfs wrote in response to a 1937 exhibition of paintings by Marc Chagall, Paul Gauguin, and Pablo Picasso that "our Indies are too beautiful, too sunny, too happy, and too contented to accept such a degenerate influence as a positive thing".

== Criticism and legacy ==
Rice Field in Java (Ernest Dezentjé, 1925)

Some works in the Mooi Indië style were criticized as highly formulaic. Brakel describes certain landscapes as being painted in endless repetition, often by different painters. Describing the work of Ernest Dezentjé, the Dutch critic Johannes Tielrooy wrote, "the water glistens like silver, the little dykes are green ... a mountain in the background, and this mountain—you can count on that—is dark blue. The mandatory palm tree is in the picture too, and in the heavens in the distance yearning yellows melt into poetic red." In subsequent years, discussion of Dutch art has generally dismissed works produced in the Indies, with most references disparaging in nature.

Similarly, the artist S. Sudjojono decried the Mooi Indië style. He wrote, "Everything is very beautiful and romantic, paradisical, everything is very pleasing, calm, and peaceful. Such paintings carry only one meaning: the beautiful Indies ... for ... foreigners and tourists." He wrote that European artists were in the Indies too briefly to be more than tourists, and that indigenous painters had prioritized their commercial interests and lacked the force of will to create original art. As a result, he wrote, painting was centred around a "holy trinity" of mountains, coconut palms, and rice fields, and any works that deviated from this formula would be rejected by art dealers. He urged artists to break away from this style and develop a style that better reflected the reality lived by Indonesians.

During the 1930s, a new generation of indigenous painters emerged. Coming mostly from the emerging middle class, these painters disassociated from the Mooi Indië movement. In Bandung, a group of five artists including Affandi and Hendra Gunawan gained prominence. Meanwhile, in the colonial capital of Batavia (now Jakarta), Sudjojono partnered with Agus Djaya to establish the Indonesian Painters Association (Persatuan Ahli Gambar Indonesia, PERSAGI) in 1938. The latter group and its ideology is commonly used in histories of Indonesian painting to understand the artists active in the area from the 1930s through the 1940s, and is described by the Indonesian art critic Sanento Yuliman as initiating the second generation of modern art in Indonesia.

In discussions of Indonesian art history, the term Mooi Indië has retained pejorative connotations. At the same time, the art critic Redza Piyadasa notes that, with attacks on the painters in the movement, the works were also given "a historical context and also, a specifically Indonesian frame of reference". As such, the Mooi Indië movement remains integral to narrating the development of modern Indonesian art.

== Works cited ==
- Brakel, Koos van (2009). "Beautiful Indies Paintings: A Colonial Medium?". In Knol, Meta; Raben, Remco; Zijlmans, Kitty (eds.). Beyond the Dutch: Indonesia, the Netherlands, and the Visual Arts, from 1900 until Now. Leiden: KIT Publishers. pp. 50–59. ISBN 978-94-6022-059-3.
- Holt, Claire (1967). Art in Indonesia: Continuities and Change. Ithaca, New York: Cornell University Press. ISBN 978-0-8014-0188-6.
- Piyadasa, Redza (4 May 1996). "Role of 'Mooi Indie' Artists". Business Times. Kuala Lumpur. p. 20 – via ProQuest.
- Purnomo, Setianingsih (2014). "Seni Rupa Masa Kolonial: Mooi Indie vs. PERSAGI" [Visual Arts in the Colonial Era: Mooi Indie vs. PERSAGI]. Ultimart: Jurnal Komunikasi Visual. 5 (1): 7–17. doi:10.31937/ultimart.v7i2.391.
- Raben, Remco (2009). "In Search of Freedom". In Knol, Meta; Raben, Remco; Zijlmans, Kitty (eds.). Beyond the Dutch: Indonesia, the Netherlands, and the Visual Arts, from 1900 until Now. Leiden: KIT Publishers. pp. 83–92. ISBN 978-94-6022-059-3.
- Sambrani, Chaitanya (2016). "PERSAGI (Persatuan Ahli-Ahli Gambar Indonesia)". Routledge Encyclopedia of Modernism. doi:10.4324/9781135000356-REM895-1. ISBN 978-1-135-00035-6.
- Wirajati, Yohanes De Britto (2023). "Kemolekan yang Ambivalen: Membaca Lukisan Mooi Indie dengan Perspektif Pascakolonialisme" [An Ambivalent Beauty: Reading Mooi Indie Paintings through a Postcolonial Perspective]. Dekonstruksi (in Indonesian). 9 (3): 69–76. doi:10.54154/dekonstruksi.v9i03.169. Archived from the original on 4 June 2026.
- Yuliman, Sanento (2023). "New Indonesian Painting". In Kent, Elly; Hooker, Virginia; Turner, Caroline (eds.). Living Art: Indonesian Artists Engage Politics, Society and History. Asian Studies. Vol. 17. Translated by Kent, Elly. Canberra: ANU Press. pp. 109–144. ISBN 978-1-76046-493-6.
