= Dezentjé =

Dezentjé is a Dutch-language surname, adapted from the French-language "De Sentier" via "Tessenier". It emerged in the Dutch East Indies (now Indonesia).

Notable people with this surname include:

- Ernest Dezentjé (1885–1972), Dutch-Indonesian painter
- Ineke Dezentjé Hamming-Bluemink (b. 1954), Dutch politician
- Tanja Dezentjé (1918–1982), Dutch-Indonesian diplomat
