= Pirngadi =

Indonesian painter (1875–1936)

Raden Mas Pirngadi
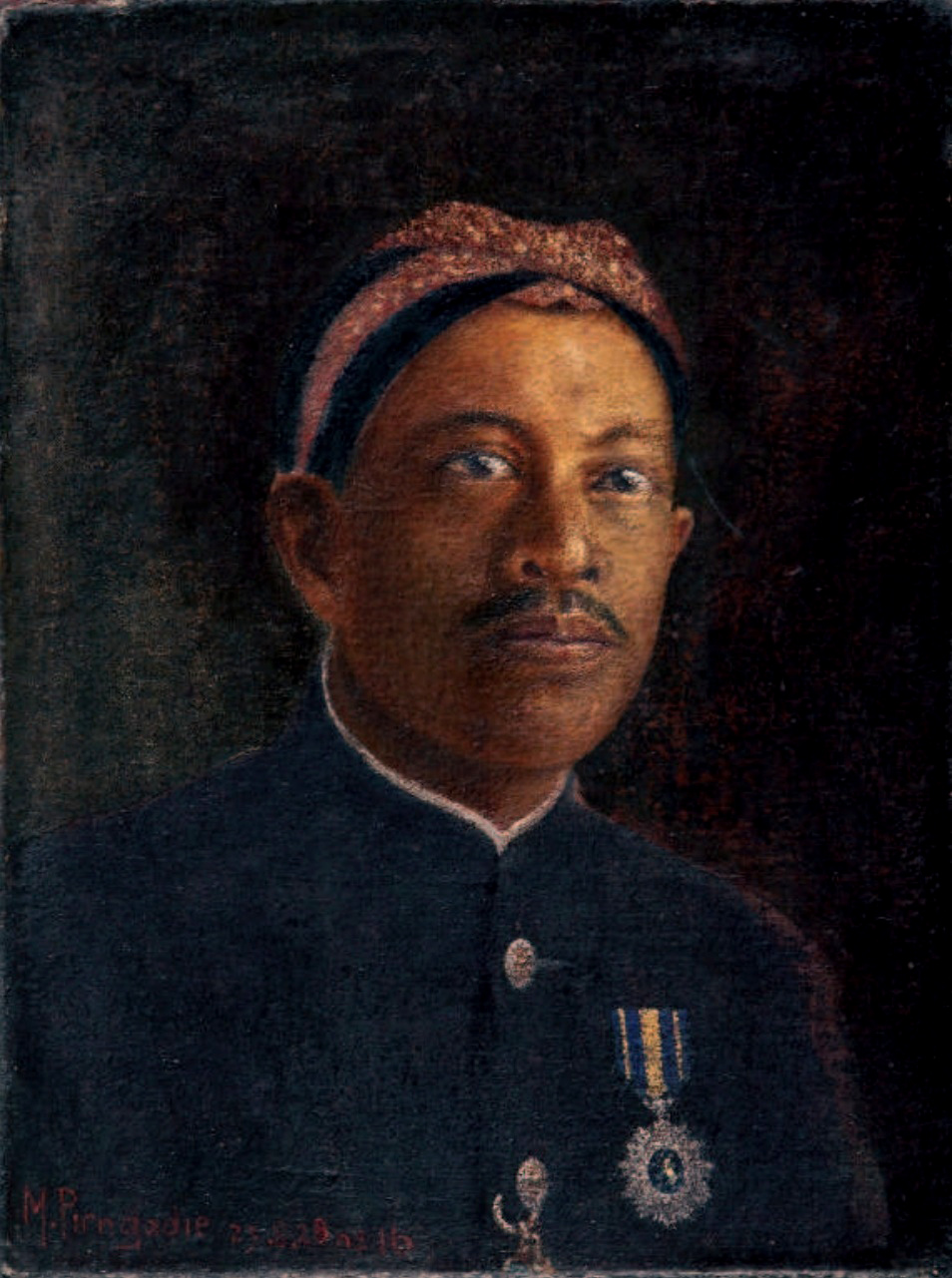
- Self-Portrait, 1930
- Born: c. 1875; Banyumas, Banyumas Residency, Dutch East Indies
- Died: 1936 (aged 60–61)
- Style: Realism, Mooi Indië

Raden Mas Pirngadi (also Pirngadie, c. 1875 – 1936) was a painter and drafter active in the Dutch East Indies (now Indonesia). Born to an aristocratic family in Banyumas, central Java, he began working for the Dutch colonial office in his youth. Through his work as a drafter, as well as training by artists such as Fredericus van Rossum du Chattel, Pirngadi learned European approaches to art and developed a realist style that was recognized for its finesse and precision. He won prizes at several exhibitions in the early 20th century, and collaborated with the Dutch researcher Johan Ernst Jasper on a five-volume record of traditional arts and crafts in the Malay Archipelago. After his death, his student S. Sudjojono criticized Pirngadi's style, giving it the label Mooi Indië (Beautiful Indies).

== Biography ==
Pirngadi was born to an aristocratic family in Banyumas, central Java, c. 1875. (Note: Some sources, such as Niessen (2013, p. 8) and Dirgantoro (2017, p. 44), give 1865.) Benefitting from his noble heritage, he interacted frequently with the Dutch ruling class. At the age of eleven, he began working at the land registry's office as a mapmaker. Through these networks, he began training under artists such as Fredericus van Rossum du Chattel, under whom he apprenticed beginning in 1889. He later worked as a draftsman with the Royal Batavian Society of Arts and Sciences, where he was noted for skill and accuracy, and collaborated with the Architectural Service of the Netherlands Indies.

Having learned European approaches to art, Pirngadi developed a realist style. In this, he was similar to several of his contemporaries, including Abdullah Suriosubroto and Wakidi, whose approach to landscapes was later emulated by artists such as Basuki Abdullah. As with his contemporaries, Pirngadi enjoyed the peace that came with travelling to rural areas such as Mount Tangkuban Perahu and Pelabuhan Ratu. Pirngadi displayed his works at numerous exhibitions in the Dutch East Indies, winning awards for his watercolours in exhibitions in Surabaya in 1905, 1907, and 1912, as well as in Semarang in 1919. In 1912, 28 of his watercolours were exhibited in The Hague; 30 were exhibited in Bandung in 1913.

Between 1906 and 1912, Pirngadi worked with the Dutch researcher Johan Ernst Jasper to record crafts in the archipelago. For this, the men drew in part from information from travelling craftsmen and in part from their travels together, including around Java and to southern Sulawesi and western and northern Sumatra. Five volumes of this work, titled De Inlandsche Kunst Nijverheid in Nederlandsch Indie (Indigenous Arts and Crafts in the Dutch East Indies), were produced, dealing respectively with basketry (1912), weaving (1912), batik (1916), gold and silver (1927), and other metals (1930); a sixth volume, on leatherwork, house construction, and earthware, was written but never published. Pirngadi provided the illustrations, which included reconstructions of ruined monuments. The set has remained an important source on Indonesian crafts into the 21st century.

Before the 1931 Paris Colonial Exposition, Pirngadi took a commission from the Royal Batavian Society to paint a map of the archipelago with seventy-eight figures, each a stereotyped representative of one of its ethnic groups. This map was exhibited at the Dutch Pavilion, where it was destroyed by fire. During his later years, Pirngadi took students such as S. Sudjojono, whom he was teaching by 1928, and Suromo Darpo Sawego, who began his studies in 1935. Pirngadi died in 1936, with his death announced in April of that year.

== Art and legacy ==
Pirngadi developed a reputation as a realist and naturalist painter. However, his landscape paintings were not entirely true-to-life, with modifications made to "improve nature", as argued by the Indonesian art critic Sanento Yuliman. Pirngadi's art frequently displayed natural landscapes as sites of peace and harmony. Reviewing a 1913 exhibition for De Expres, the art critic J. H. Francois praised Pirngadi's work, writing that, despite technical deficiencies in some works, the artist had overcome his lack of formal education to present "an artist's soul seeking expression". (Note: Original: "... een kunstenaarsziel, die naar uiting zoekt.") The American art historian Claire Holt writes that Pirngadi's works are "meticulously precise" and marked by "great finesse in form and feeling".

Pirngadi was noted for his careful use of colours, which highlighted the natural beauty of the Dutch East Indies. Such colours were carefully used to create specific impressions. He is written to have scolded his student Sudjojono for his colour choice, urging:

When you depict a cloud, use white, ochre and mix in a little vermillion. Then the shadows are those colours with blue added. To show the water of a rice field, use these colours with a little more ochre and blue. Ochre is the key colour. Avoid using black and white.

In the late 1930s, Sudjojono wrote critically about the style of Pirngadi and his contemporaries. He argued that their style, which he denounced as Mooi Indië (lit. 'Beautiful Indies'), was based around a "holy trinity" of mountains, coconut palms, and rice fields. He called for artists to depict everyday life, "transmuted by the artist himself who is immersed in it", rather than the "mental world of the tourist". Sudjojono and his contemporary Agus Djaya co-established the Indonesian Painters Association (Persatuan Ahli Gambar Indonesia; PERSAGI). This organization eventually encompassed some 30 painters, including fellow Pirngadi apprentice Suromo.

== Selected works ==
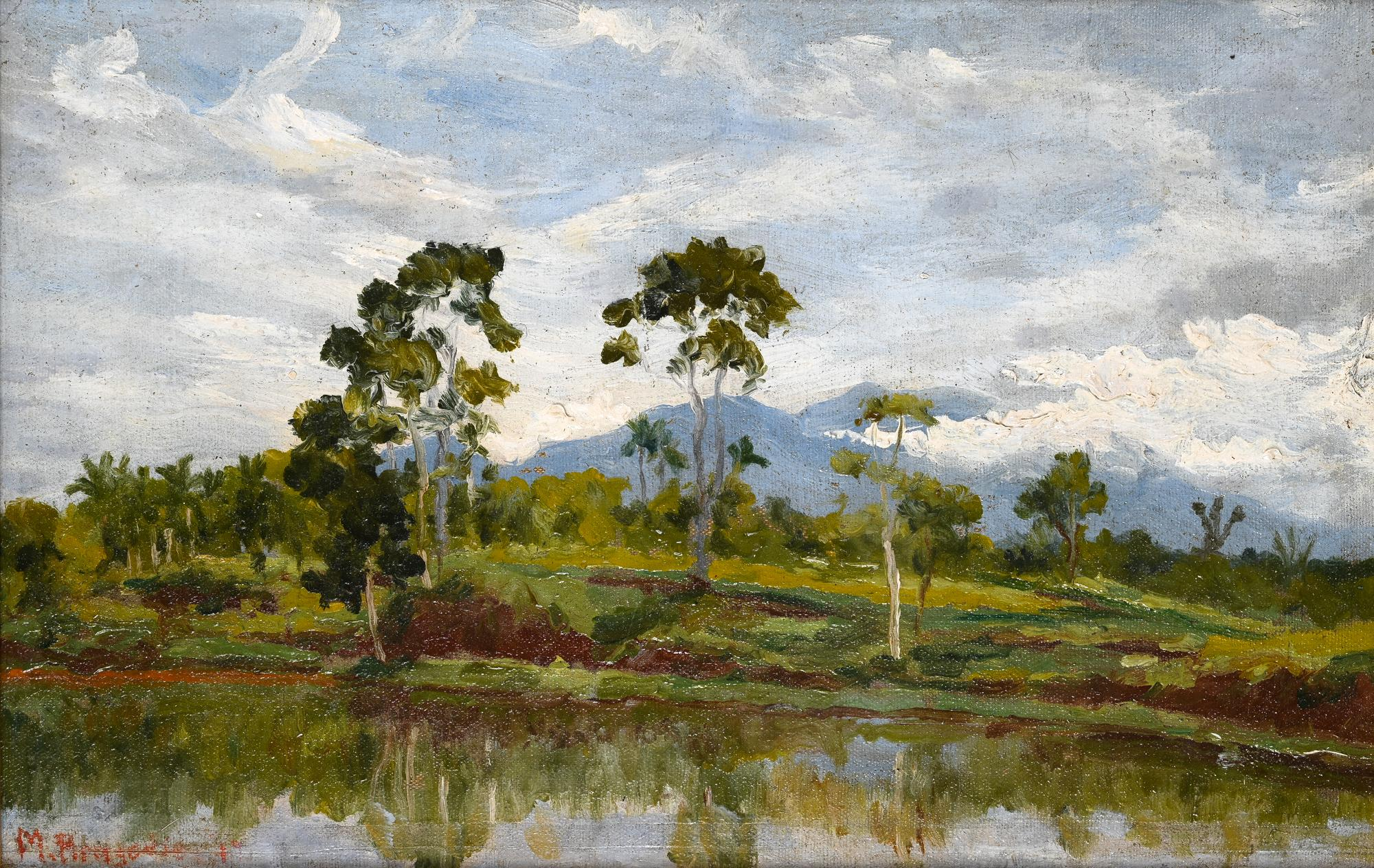
Indonesian Landscape (undated)

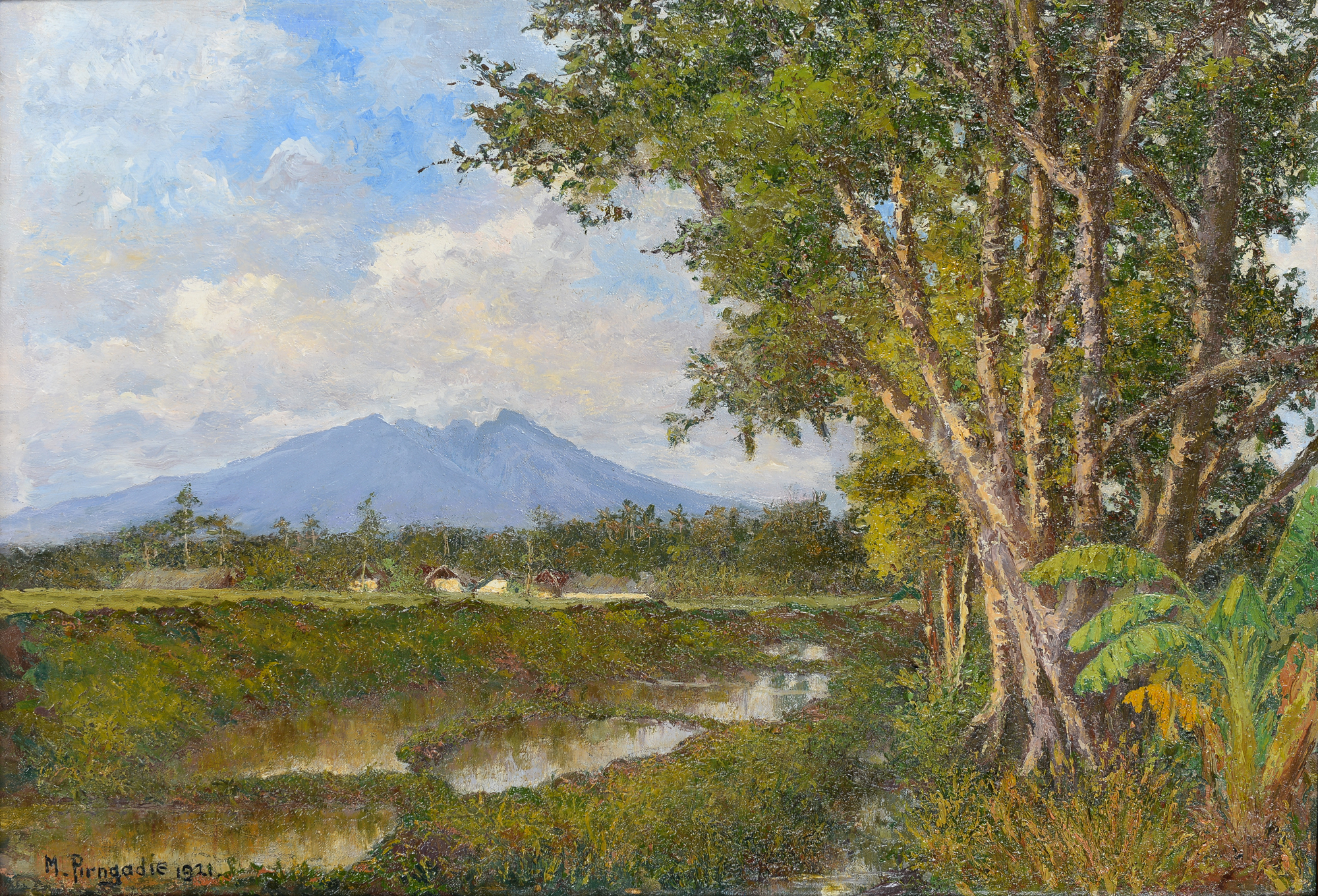
Indonesian Landscape (1921)

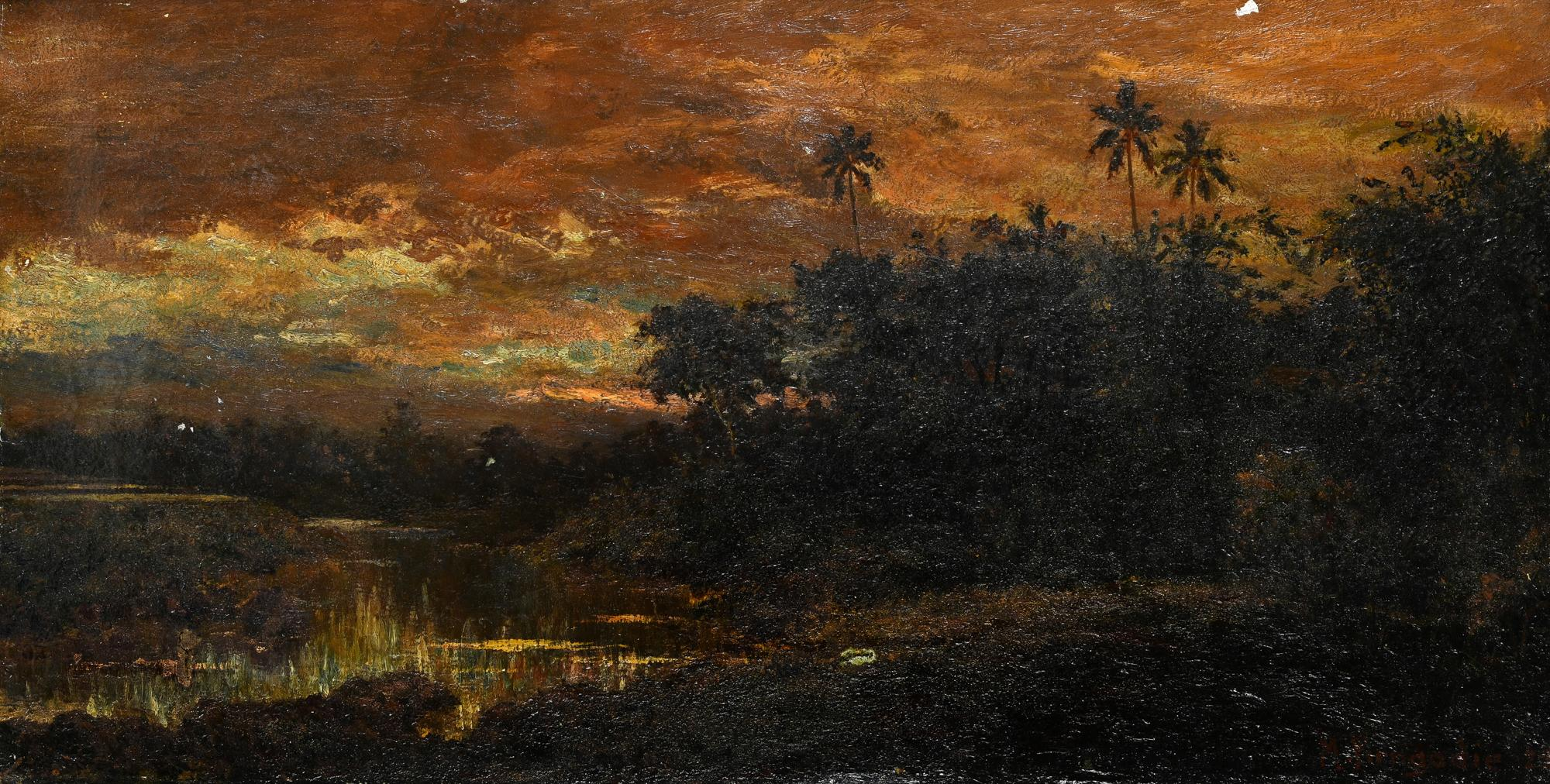
Indonesian Landscape (1925)

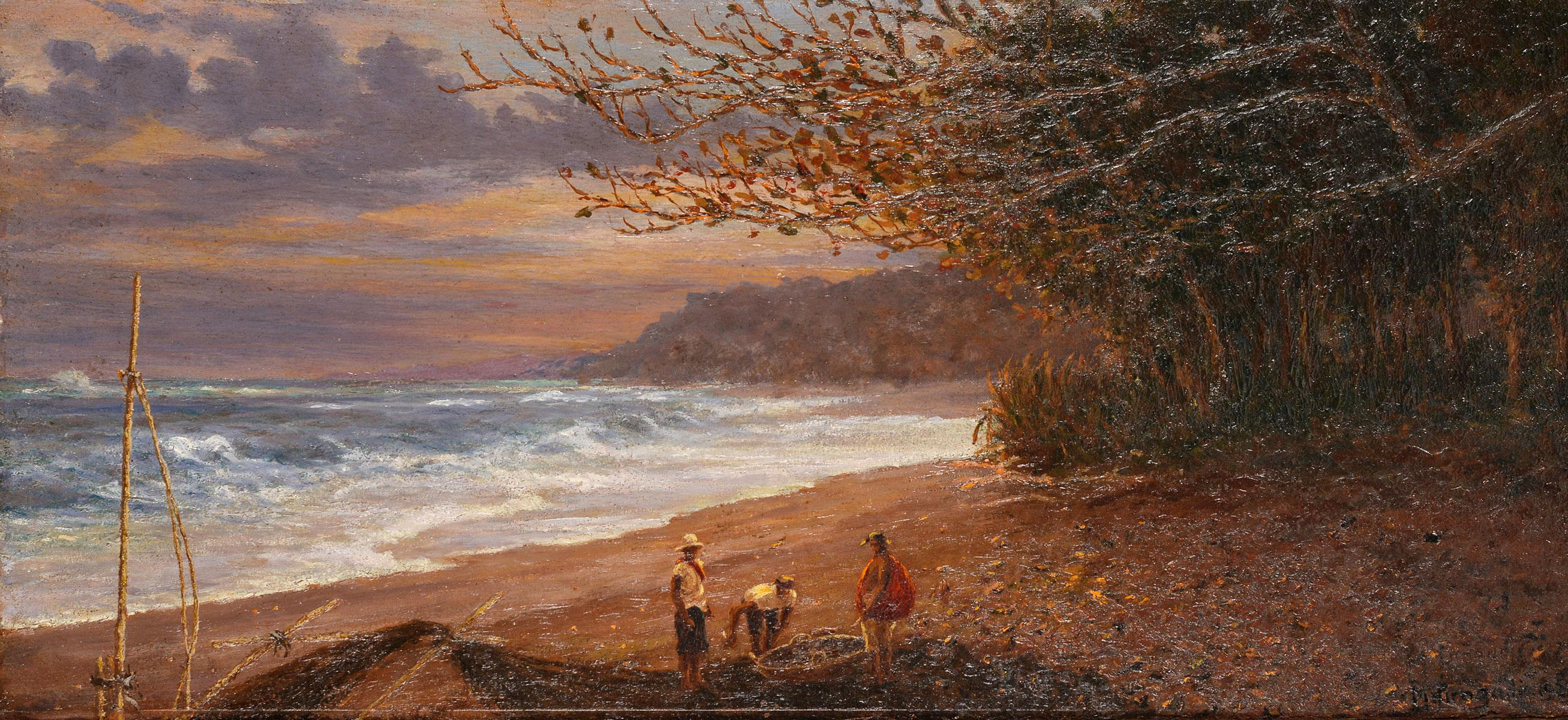
Fishermen at the Beach (1928)

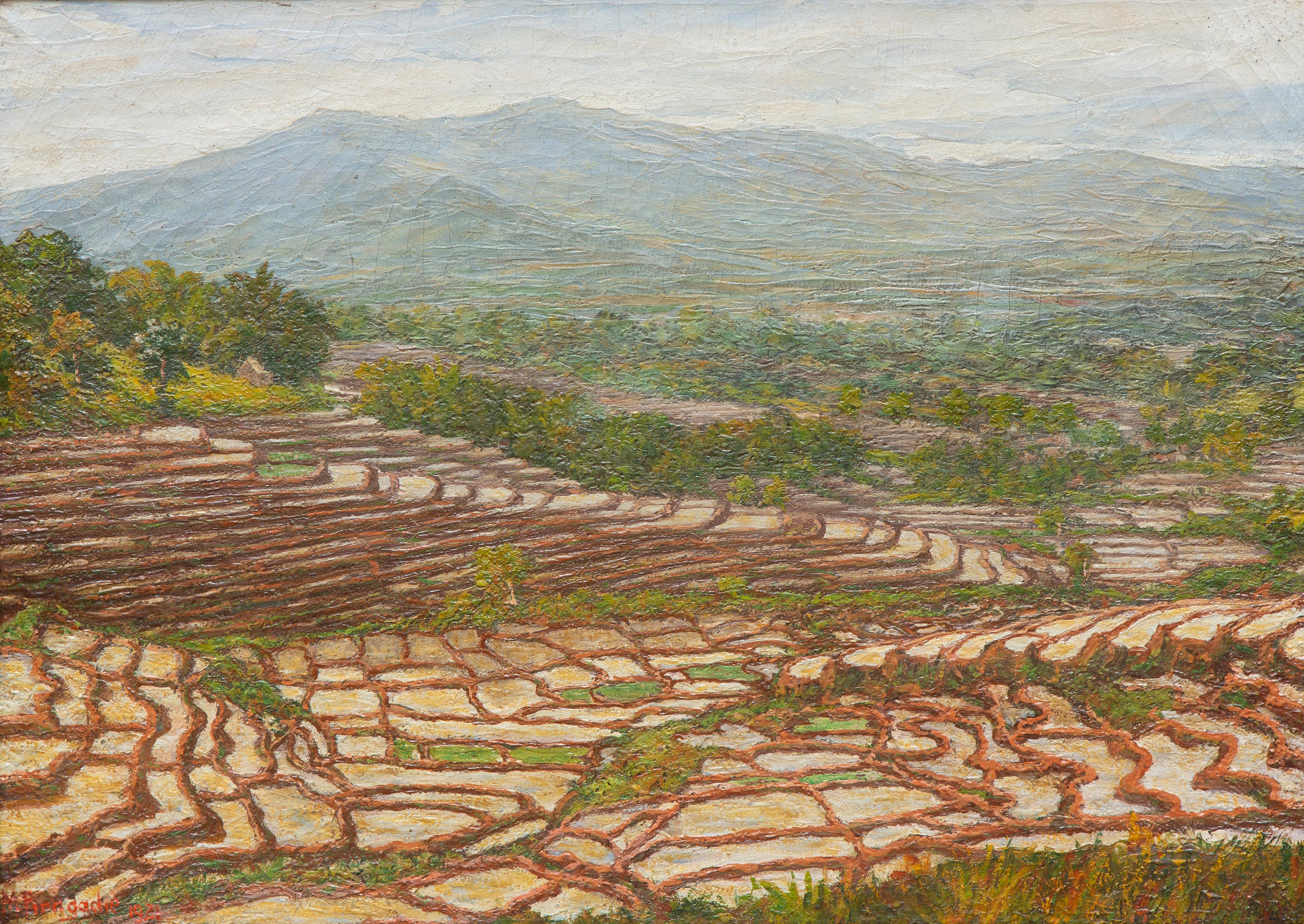
A Landscape with Terraced Paddy Fields (1931)

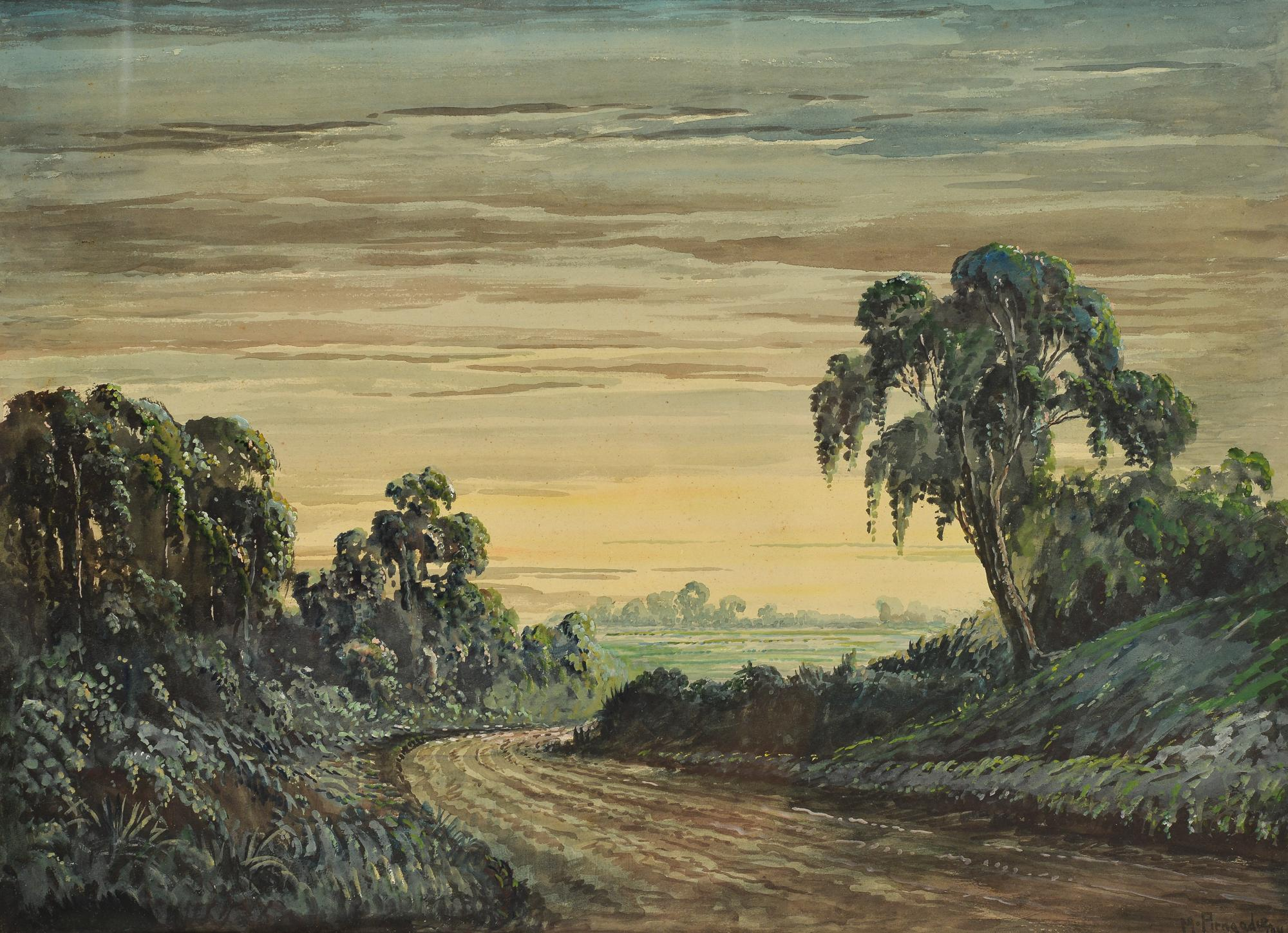
Country Road (1931)

== Works cited ==
- Boonstra, Sadiah (3 May 2021). "Exhibited as Losers". Inside Indonesia. Archived from the original on 1 June 2026.
- Dirgantoro, Wulan (2017). Feminisms and Contemporary Art in Indonesia: Defining Experiences. Amsterdam: Amsterdam University Press. pp. 77–118. doi:10.1017/9789048526994. ISBN 978-90-485-2699-4.
- Francois, J. H. (5 March 1913). "Indische Kunst in Holland" [Indies Art in Holland]. De Expres (in Dutch). Bandung. p. 1.
- Holt, Claire (1967). Art in Indonesia: Continuities and Change. Ithaca, New York: Cornell University Press. ISBN 978-0-8014-0188-6.
- "Mas Pirngadie". Encyclopedia of Jakarta (in Indonesian). Government of Jakarta. Archived from the original on 13 December 2013.
- "Mas Pirngadi". Bataviaasch Nieuwsblad (in Dutch). Batavia. 4 April 1936. p. 1.
- Niessen, Sandra (2013). Re-tracing Jasper and Pirngadie's Footsteps. Jakarta: Textile Museum of Jakarta. ISBN 978-602-1354-00-1.
- "Oost-Indië: Een Javaansche Schilder" [East Indies: A Javanese Painter]. Provinciale Geldersche en Nijmeegsche Courant (in Dutch). Nijmegen. 30 April 1912. p. 6.
- "R. M. Pirngadi" (in Indonesian). Taman Ismail Marzuki. Archived from the original on 2 April 2015.
- Yuliman, Sanento (2023). "New Indonesian Painting". In Kent, Elly; Hooker, Virginia; Turner, Caroline (eds.). Living Art: Indonesian Artists Engage Politics, Society and History. Asian Studies. Vol. 17. Translated by Kent, Elly. Canberra: ANU Press. pp. 109–144. ISBN 978-1-76046-493-6.
