= Velthuysen =

Velthuysen, also spelled Velthuizen, is a surname. Notable people with this name include:

- Henry van Velthuysen (1881–1954), Dutch painter
- Lambert van Velthuysen (1622–1685), Dutch philosopher
- Piet Velthuizen (b. 1986), Dutch footballer and Olympian
- Rick van Velthuysen (b. 1961), Dutch radio DJ
