= Henry van Velthuysen =

Dutch painter (1881–1954)

- Born: 10 February 1881; Tanjung, Dutch East Indies
- Died: 4 December 1954 (aged 73); The Hague, Netherlands
- Movement: Mooi Indië

Henry van Velthuysen (also Henri, 17 April 1881 – 4 December 1954) was a Dutch painter associated with the Mooi Indië movement. Born in the Dutch East Indies, he was educated at the University of California, Berkeley, before returning to the Indies and working as a civil servant. He developed a reputation as a painter through the 1920s, holding several exhibitions and writing extensively on art in newspapers and magazines. While continuing to exhibit through the 1940s, he worked with younger painters to develop their skills. During the Indonesian National Revolution, he evacuated to The Hague, where he spent his remaining years. Velthuysen was a critic of modern art, holding that painters "are and will remain imitators of nature, nothing more, nothing less". Contemporary reviewers highlighted his simple approach to art.

== Biography ==
Velthuysen was born in Tanjung, Dutch East Indies (now Indonesia), on 17 April 1881. He travelled to the United States as a student, receiving formal training in the arts at the University of California, Berkeley. He returned to the Indies in 1905, after spending some time in South Africa. Velthuysen married Clara Adeleida Boers. They were divorced on 24 September 1912. At the time, he was working as a civil servant in Batavia (now Jakarta).

In the 1920s, Velthuysen began to develop a reputation as a painter. His portrait of Hans van de Wall adorned the cover of the June 1924 edition of d'Orient magazine. In 1926, he held his first solo exhibition in Bandung. In September 1928, he participated in an art exhibition at the Gambir Fair, contributing both portraits and cityscapes. The reviewer for the Bataviaasch Nieuwsblad highlighted his portraits, which were described as being "of striking accuracy in the rendering of type and posture" (Note: Original: "van een treffende juistheid in weergave van type en houding".) of their subjects, while also deeming the paintings of Batavia to be quite satisfactory. Velthuysen was one of only two painters from the Indies to have their work exhibited at the Netherlands Pavilion of the Paris Colonial Exposition in 1931, the other being Piet Ouborg. During this period, Velthuysen also wrote reviews in several newspapers and magazines, including d'Orient, and became a member of the Kunstkring (Art Circle).

By the 1930s, Velthuysen led the Talens Studio in Batavia. He sponsored an exhibition for himself in 1935, with another for his pupils to follow. Two years later, he was commissioned by Aneta to complete a posthumous portrait of the news agency's founder, Dominique Willem Berretty. The portrait was hung in Aneta's headquarters. Later in 1937, he held a joint exhibition with Jo König at the Hotel des Indes, which the Nieuws van den Dag voor Nederlandsch-Indië reported to be well attended. Velthuysen held a solo exhibition at the same venue the following year.

In 1938, De Indische Courant described Velthuysen as the Nestor of the Indies, a wise guide for younger generations. In 1939, he exhibited fifty paintings at the Hotel des Indes. Subjects ranged from the vistas of Parahyangan to the Chinese houses of Batavia, and also included portraits of men, women, and children. The Nieuws van den dag voor Nederlandsch-Indië gave special praise to the portraits, writing "Velthuysen has shown that he knows how to penetrate deeper than the mask of the face. He has not only captured the right expression but, with that indefinable brushstroke, revealed a part of the personality." (Note: Original: "Van Velthuysen heeft in zijn portretten getoond, dat hij dieper weet door te dringen dan het masker van het gelaat. Hij heeft niet alleen de juiste expressie getroffen, maar met dat ondefinieerbare penseeistreekje een deel vart de persoonlijkheid geopenbaard..") In 1941, he held several further exhibitions in Batavia.

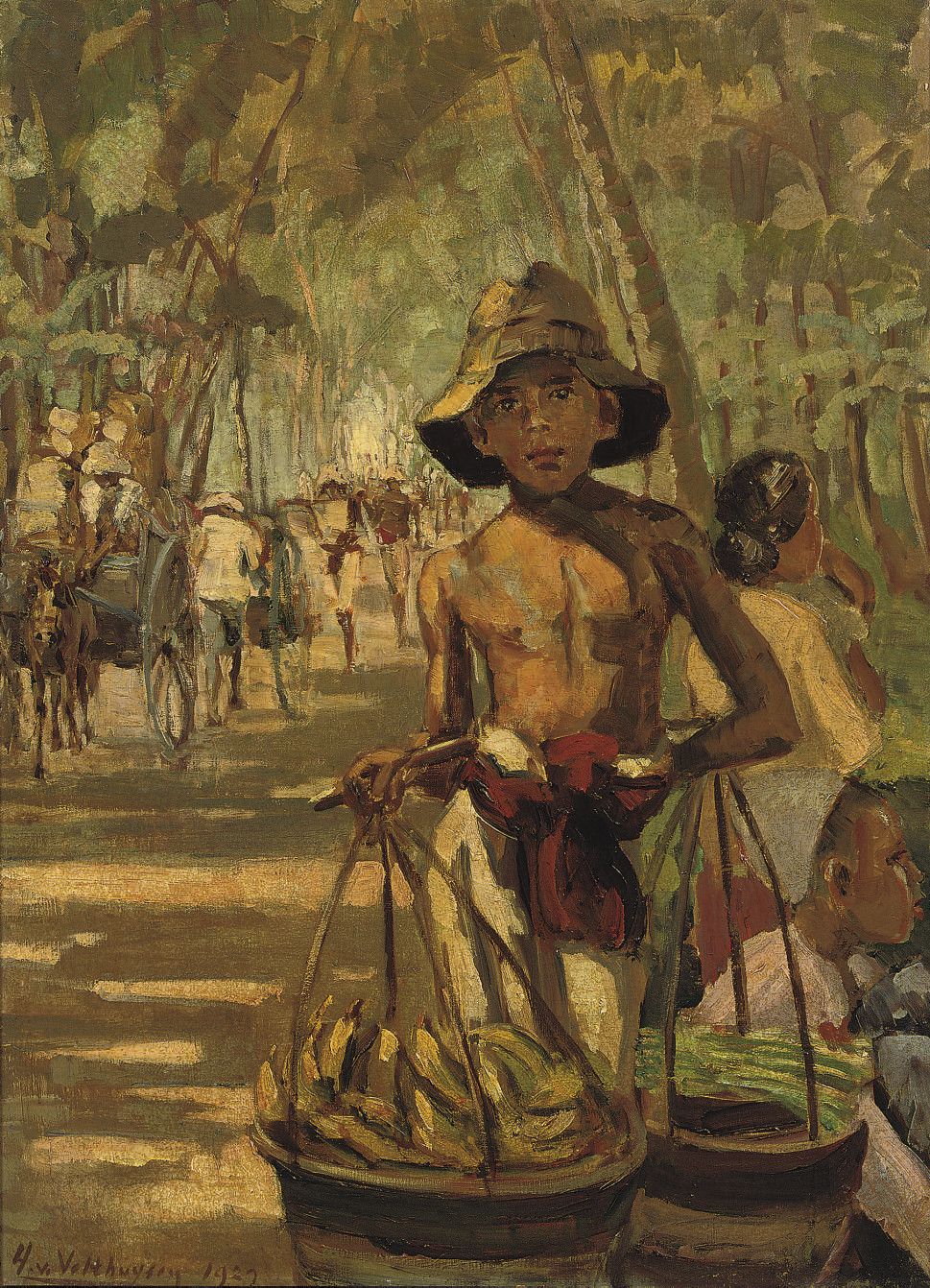
Indonesian Street Vendor Selling Bananas (1929)

Velthuysen fled the Indies during the Indonesian National Revolution of 1945–1949. He settled in The Hague, where he held an exhibition in 1947, presenting landscapes completed in the Netherlands based on sketches he had produced previously. Velthuysen died in The Hague on 4 December 1954. It was announced that he would be buried at the Oud Eik en Duinen cemetery.

== Art ==
Velthuysen was known for his portraits and landscapes, which included several works depicting the archipelago's indigenous peoples and landscapes. De Indische Courant wrote that his style relied on flat colours for his portraits, which offered a calming effect, though his landscapes tended to interplay light and colour more dynamically. In his history of early 20th century Indonesian painting, M. Agus Burhan wrote that Velthuysen continuously used the same colour patterns for his skies.

Contemporary reviewers in the Indies praised Velthuysen's approach. The reviewer for De Koerier described Velthuysen's work as "fresh and simple, without any ostentation, excessive splendor or pomp, or false artistry". (Note: Original: "Het werk van Henry van Velthuysen is frisch en eenvoudig, zonder eenig vertoon; van overdadige pracht of praal of van valsche artisticiteit.") Reviewing Velthuysen's 1939 exhibition, the Het Nieuws van den dag voor Nederlandsch-Indië similarly emphasized Velthuysen's simple approach, writing that it endeared him to audiences and communicated his status as "a painter of bold and powerful skill, honest yet sensitive in his sentiment". (Note: Original: "... een schilder van forsch en krachtig kunnen, eerlijk en toch gevoelig in zijn sentiment".)

Velthuysen showed disdain for modern art. Modernist techniques likewise did not influence his paintings, though the Soerabaijasch Handelsblad described him as doing more than thoughtlessly imitating impressionism. Reviewing a 1938 exhibition by Jan Frank Niemantsverdriet, Velthuysen dismissed the artist's works as "infantile construction-kit shapes". Similarly, the Bataviaasch Nieuwsblad interpreted one of his 1941 paintings as mocking the modern sculpture of Jacob Epstein. According to Velthuysen, "Through the ages painting has been, and will always remain, imitation of nature. We artists are and will remain imitators of nature, nothing more, nothing less, even if some painters ... think that they are more than that." Velthuysen is associated with the Mooi Indië ('Beautiful Indies') movement of romantic landscape painting.

== Works cited ==
- "Advertentie" [Advertorials]. Het Nieuws van den dag voor Nederlandsch-Indië (in Dutch). Batavia. 24 September 1912. p. 10.
- Brakel, Koos van (2009). "Beautiful Indies Paintings: A Colonial Medium?". In Knol, Meta; Raben, Remco; Zijlmans, Kitty (eds.). Beyond the Dutch: Indonesia, the Netherlands, and the Visual Arts, from 1900 until Now. Leiden: KIT Publishers. pp. 50–59. ISBN 978-94-6022-059-3.
- Burhan, M. Agus (2008). Perkembangan Seni Lukis Mooi Indië sampai Persagi di Batavia, 1900–1942 [The Development of Painting, Mooi Indië to Persagi in Batavia, 1900–1942] (in Indonesian). Jakarta: National Gallery of Indonesia. ISBN 978-979-17479-5-0.
- "Expositie Henry van Velthuysen" [Henry van Velthuysen Exhibition]. De Koerier (in Dutch). Bandung. 5 November 1938. p. 2.
- "Familiebericht" [Family News]. Het Vaderland (in Dutch). The Hague. 7 December 1954. p. 10.
- "Henry van Velthuysen". RKD Research. Netherlands Institute for Art History. Archived from the original on 17 August 2026.
- "Kunst: Henri van Velthuysen" [Kunst: Henri van Velthuysen]. Soerabaijasch Handelsblad (in Dutch). Surabaya. 10 September 1938. p. 6.
- "Kunst: Henry van Velthuysen" [Arts: Henry van Velthuysen]. Bataviaasch Nieuwsblad (in Dutch). Batavia. 18 February 1941. p. 3.
- "Kunst: Henry van Velthuysen, Schilderijen-tentoonstelling te Batavia" [Arts: Henry van Velthuysen, Painting Exhibition in Batavia]. De Indische Courant (in Dutch). Surabaya. 7 November 1938. p. 16.
- "Kunst: Parijsche Tentoonstelling" [Arts: Paris Exhibition]. De Indische Courant (in Dutch). Surabaya. 22 June 1931. p. 9.
- "Kunst: Van Velthuysen's Werk" [Arts: Van Velthuysen's Work]. Het Nieuws van den dag voor Nederlandsch-Indië (in Dutch). Batavia. 2 May 1939. p. 6.
- "Kunst en Letteren: Henry van Velthuysen Exposeert" [Arts and Letters: Exposition by Henry van Velthuysen]. Het Dagblad: Uitgave van de Nederlandsche Dagbladpers te Batavia (in Dutch). Jakarta. 6 January 1947. p. 3.
- "Kunst en Letteren: Schilderijen: De Pasar Gambir-Tenloonstelling" [Arts and Letters: Painters: The Pasar Gambir Exhibition]. Bataviaasch Nieuwsblad (in Dutch). Batavia. 3 September 1928. p. 7.
- "Persbureau ANETA: Portret van Wijlen D.W. Berretty" [ANETA Press Bureau: Portrait of the Late D.W. Berretty]. De Indische Courant (in Dutch). Surabaya. 14 September 1937. p. 1.
- "Schilderijen-Expositie: Henry van Velthuysen" [Painting Exposition: Henry van Velthuysen]. Het Nieuws van den dag voor Nederlandsch-Indië (in Dutch). Batavia. 13 December 1935. p. 7.
- "Schilderijen-Tentoonstelling in 'Des Indes'" [Painting Exhibition at 'Des Indes']. Het Nieuws van den dag voor Nederlandsch-Indië (in Dutch). Batavia. 11 October 1937. p. 7.
- "Tijdschrift" [Magazines]. Bataviaasch Nieuwsblad (in Dutch). Batavia. 18 June 1924. p. 6.
