= Basoeki Abdullah Museum =

Coordinates: 6.2897°S 106.7934°E

- Museum Basoeki Abdullah
- Established: 25 September 2001
- Location: Jalan Keuangan Raya 19, Cilandak Barat, South Jakarta, Indonesia
- Type: Art museum
- Owner: Ministry of Culture (Indonesian Heritage Agency)
- Public transit access: Fatmawati Indomaret
- Website: www.museumbasoekiabdullah.or.id/index.php/web/lang/en

Basoeki Abdullah Museum (Indonesian: Museum Basoeki Abdullah) is an art museum located in South Jakarta, Indonesia. It contains paintings and the personal collection of Basoeki Abdullah, including statues, masks, puppets, and weapons. The museum is managed by the Ministry of Education and Culture. Besides being used for exhibitions, the museum is also used to hold workshops.

== History ==
Basoeki Abdullah Museum was established on 25 September 2001 and inaugurated by the Minister of Culture and Tourism I Gede Ardika. The museum was founded as provided for in the will of Basuki Abdullah, who died on 5 November 1993. Basoeki Abdullah bequeathed his paintings and personal collection together with his house to the Government of The Republic of Indonesia. In 1998 the house, at Keuangan Raya street in South Jakarta, was handed to the Directorate General of Culture as the relevant part of the Indonesian Government. The building was then renovated in order to be used as a museum.

== See also ==
- List of museums and cultural institutions in Indonesia
- List of single-artist museums
