= Fredericus van Rossum du Chattel =

Dutch painter (1856–1917)

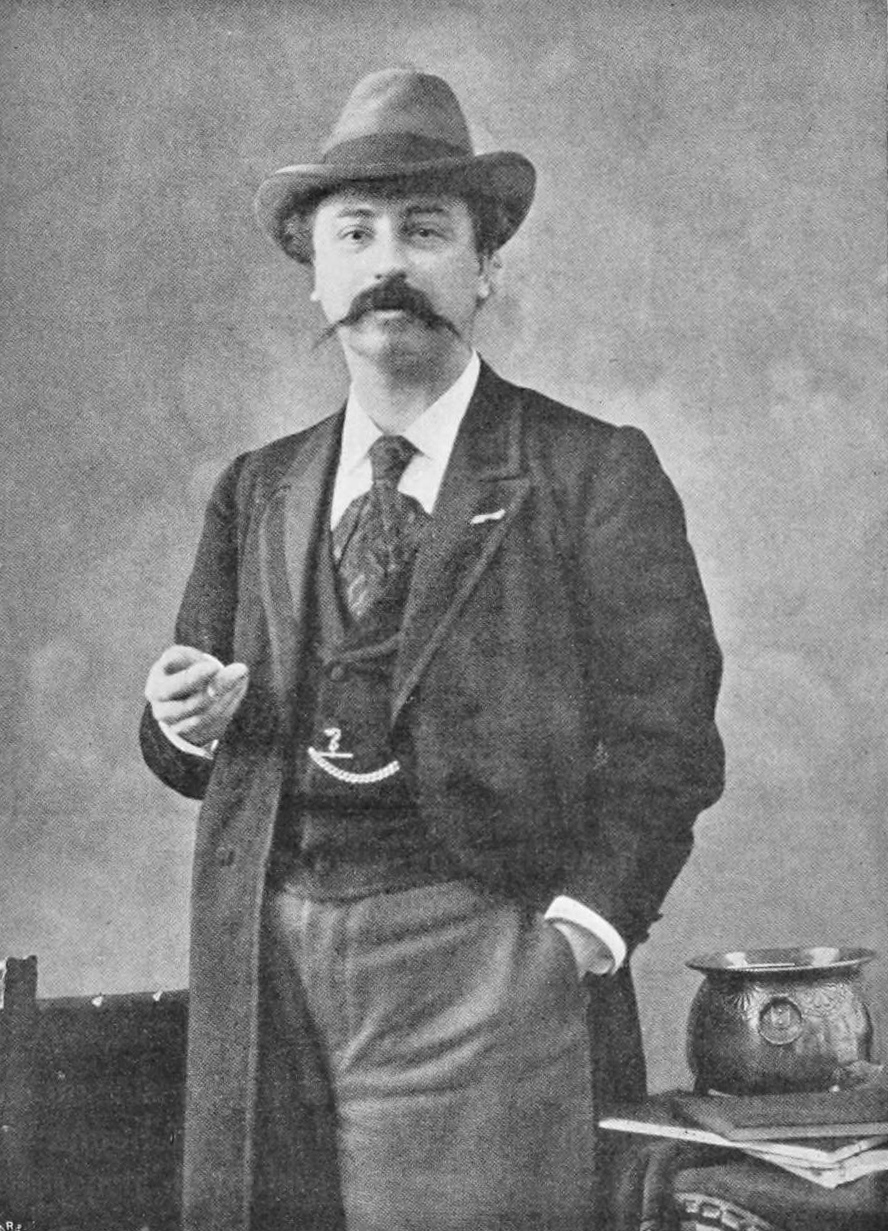
- du Chattel, c. 1898
- Born: 10 February 1856; Leiden, the Netherlands
- Died: 5 March 1917 (aged 61); Yokohama, Japan
- Style: Impressionism, Mooi Indië

Fredericus Jacobus van Rossum du Chattel (10 February 1856 – 5 March 1917) was a Dutch landscape painter who worked primarily with watercolours. The son of an amateur artist, du Chattel took up painting in his youth and received a royal scholarship to study in The Hague in 1873. Apprenticing to Willem Maris, he exhibited his first work two years later, which was positively received. Winning several prizes at exhibitions throughout Europe, in the 1880s du Chattel developed a reputation as a painter of the Vecht River. In 1908, he travelled to the Dutch East Indies (now Indonesia), where he captured the landscapes of Java and Sumatra and held several exhibitions. At the time of his death, works by du Chattel were held in several museums.

== Biography ==
=== Early life and career ===
Fredericus du Chattel was born in Leiden, the Netherlands, on 10 February 1856. The son of an amateur painter-cum-restorationist, he took to the arts from a young age, learning from his father and enrolling in classes with the Mathesis Scientiarum Genitrix. In 1873, at the age of seventeen, he travelled to The Hague to seek further instruction, having received a scholarship through King William III. He worked with several young artists, obtaining new ideas through their communal discussions, before ultimately apprenticing to Willem Maris.

In 1875, du Chattel participated in his first public exhibition, presenting his painting Bij Oestgeest ('At Oestgeest') at the triennial exhibition in The Hague. Following favourable critical reception, du Chattel continued to paint. He participated in the 1881 salon in The Hague, where the Dagblad van Zuidholland en 's Gravenhage highlighted his contributions as "true jewels of the Salon". (Note: Original: "... werkelijk sieraden van den Salon.".) The reviewer compared du Chattel's river scene to the works of Johannes Vermeer in its "power, freshness, and clarity of water and sky". (Note: Original: "... kracht; frischheid en helderheid in water ea lucht...".) Du Chattel participated in the Colonial World Exhibition in Amsterdam in 1883, winning a silver medal.

On 21 September 1882, du Chattel married Emma Wilhelmina Koolemans Beunen in Voorburg. The family moved to Vreeland on the Vecht River in 1883. There, du Chattel worked extensively on landscape paintings of the area during this period, which increased his popularity in the Dutch market. The couple had their first daughter in September 1883. They left Vreeland in 1886, returning to The Hague. They had a son in August 1887. At the 1889 World's Fair in Paris, du Chattel earned a silver medal. In 1891, du Chattel received the Knight's Cross of Saint Michael in Bavaria, Germany. He was a member of the Order of Leopold (Belgium).

=== Travels in the Indies ===
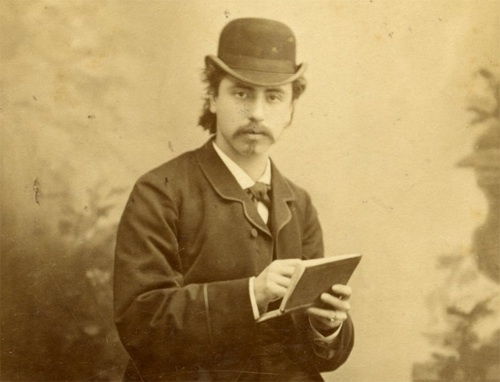
Du Chattel with his sketchbook, c. 1890

In 1908, du Chattel travelled to the Dutch East Indies (now Indonesia), where his son owned a plantation. There, he continued to paint, and took several students, including Pirngadi. He held several exhibitions. In Yogyakarta, du Chattel displayed approximately fifty watercolours. The reviewer for the Soerabaijasch Handelsblad wrote that du Chattel had "completely fallen under the influence of the overwhelming beauty ... of Indies nature", (Note: Original: "... de heer Du Chattel zeil volkomen ouder den invloed is gekomen vaa het overweldigend mooie in de natuur; in du Indische natuur".) and praised the artist's ability to capture the colour and light of the archipelago while still retaining a Dutch character. Reviewing a 1909 exhibition of sixty works in Batavia (now Jakarta), the Nieuws van den Dag voor Nederlandsch-Indië was more critical, holding that du Chattel had yet to reach beyond the natural, and thus failed to evoke emotions in his audience. De Sumatra Post, meanwhile, considered his earliest renditions of the Indies to be too entrenched in Dutch landscapes. In 1913, du Chattel published a collection of twelve watercolours titled Mooi Indië. (Note: Brakel (2009, p. 54) writes that this was probably the first use of the term to refer to landscape paintings in the Indies.)

After returning to the Netherlands, du Chattel exhibited watercolours from the Indies, and the family settled in Scheveningen. In August 1915, he travelled again to the Indies, departing aboard the S.S. Prins der Nederlanden for Belawan in Medan, Sumatra, with Emma. In March 1916, he held a solo exhibition at the Hotel de Boer in Medan. The reviewer for De Sumatra Post wrote that the painter had "elevated himself to the true Indies watercolourist" (Note: Original: "Ditmaal echter heeft Du Chattel zich naar onza meening verheven tot den werkelgkea ladischen aquarellist.".) with his Sumatran works.

In September 1916, du Chattel travelled to Surabaya, hoping to capture more of the Javan landscape. His wife Emma died on 12 January, after which du Chattel's existing heart problems were exacerbated and he became sickly. Despite a successful solo exhibition, he desired to return to the Netherlands, and departed on return journey aboard the Kawi via Japan and San Francisco. However, the trip was not completed. Du Chattel died in Yokohama on 5 March 1917. He was buried in Nagasaki after a procession led by Reverend Volten and attended by the Consul General from Belgium.

== Art ==
Du Chattel was an impressionist who worked extensively with landscapes, which in the late 19th century included the area around the Vecht as well as the Broeksloot in The Hague and the canals of Leidschendam and Loosduinen. Writing in 1898, the painter Johan Gram described him as using watercolours to attain "the power and intensity of oil paint", (Note: Original: "In de waterverf kunst heeft Du Chattel het zoo ver gebracht, dat zijne teekeningen herhaaldelijk de kracht en intensiteit van olieverf bereiken.") with space and depth expressed through clouds, framing, and reflections. At the time of his death, works by du Chattel were held in several museums, including the Mesdag Collection, the Gemeentemuseum (now Kunstmuseum Den Haag), the Rijksmuseum, and the Stedelijk Museum.

== Selected works ==
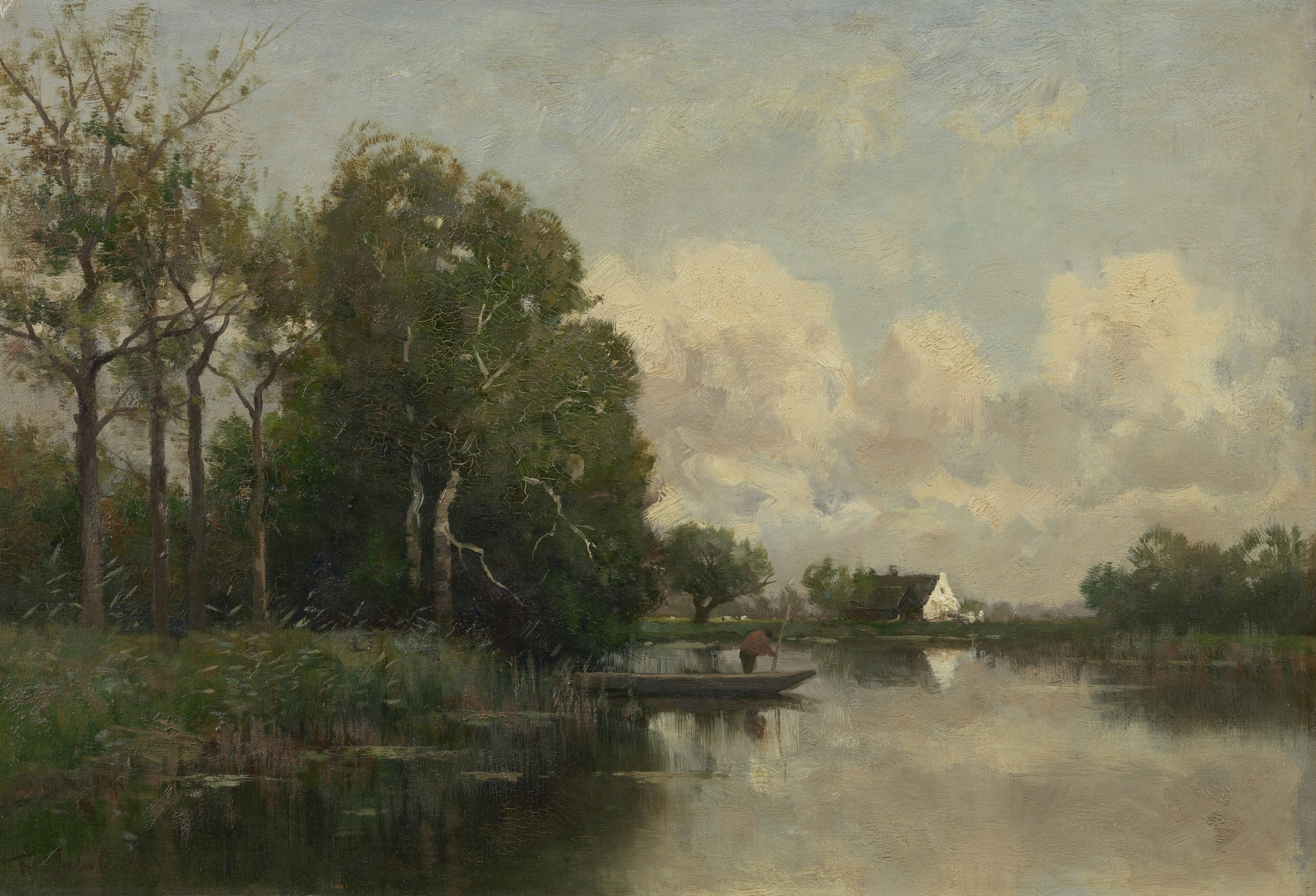
Landscape in Vreeland (undated)

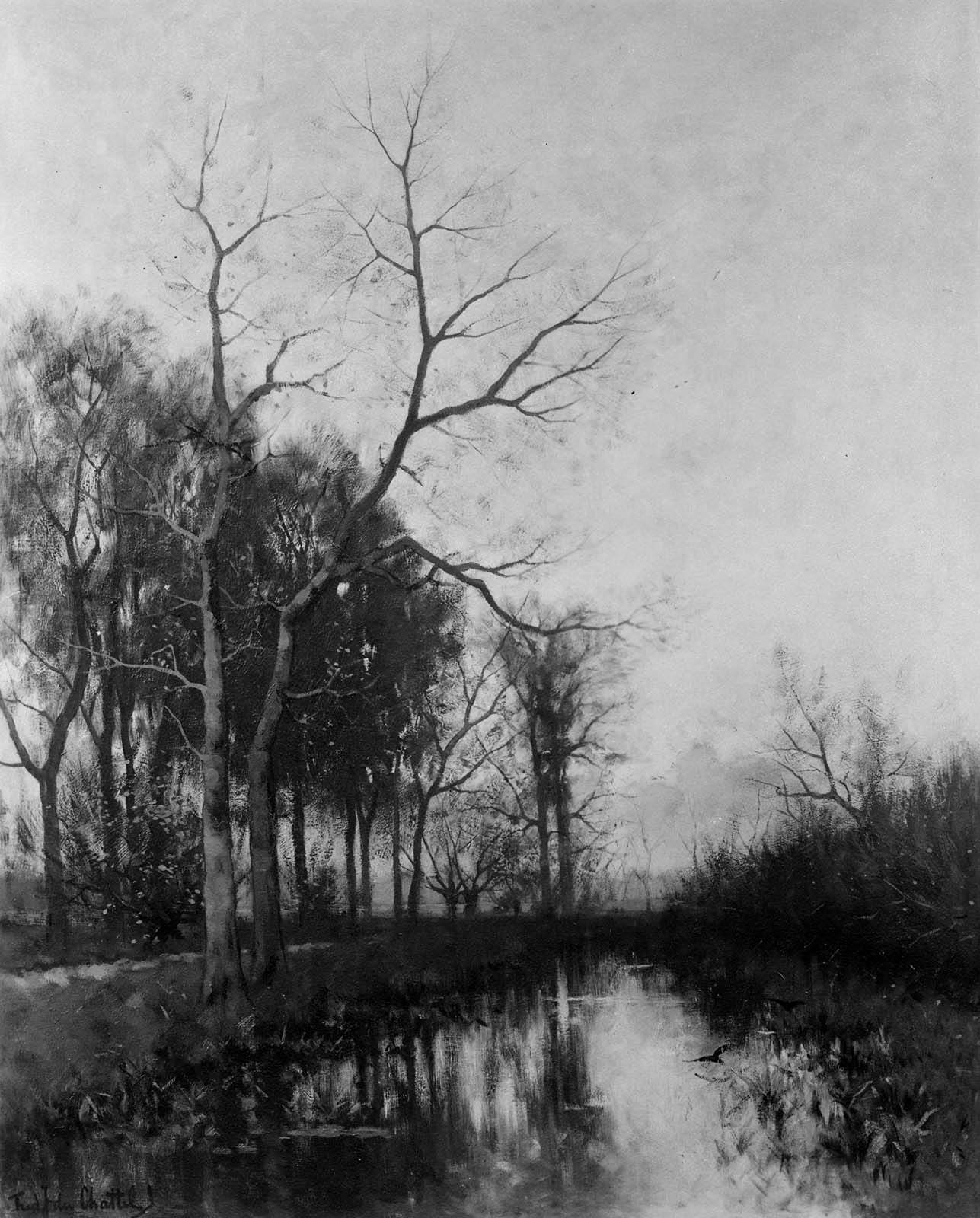
Canal in Autumn (undated)

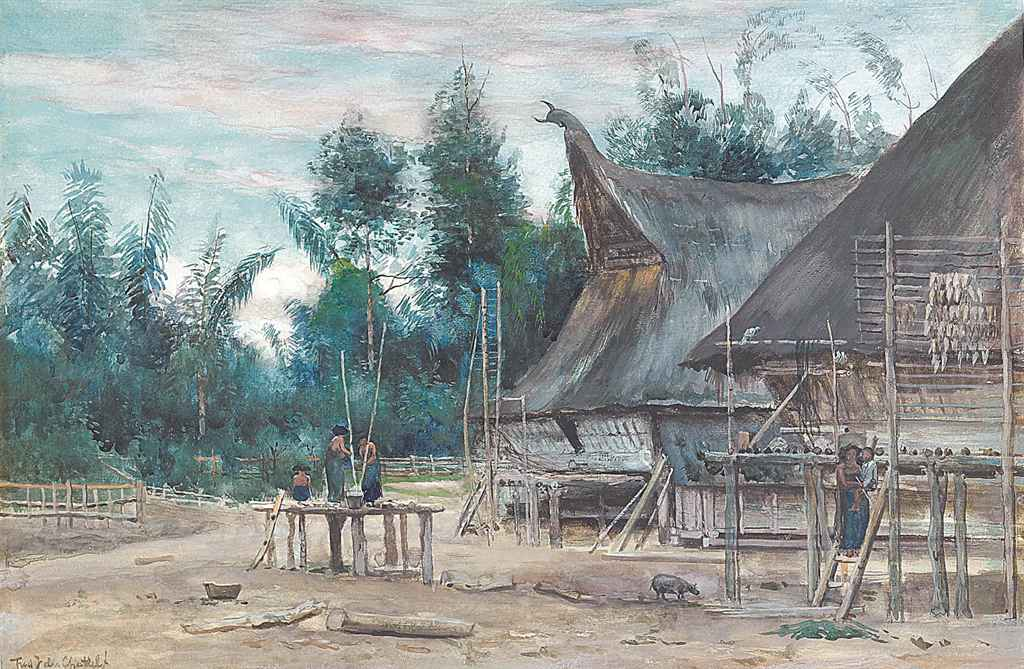
Kampong Houses of the Pendoeloe (undated)

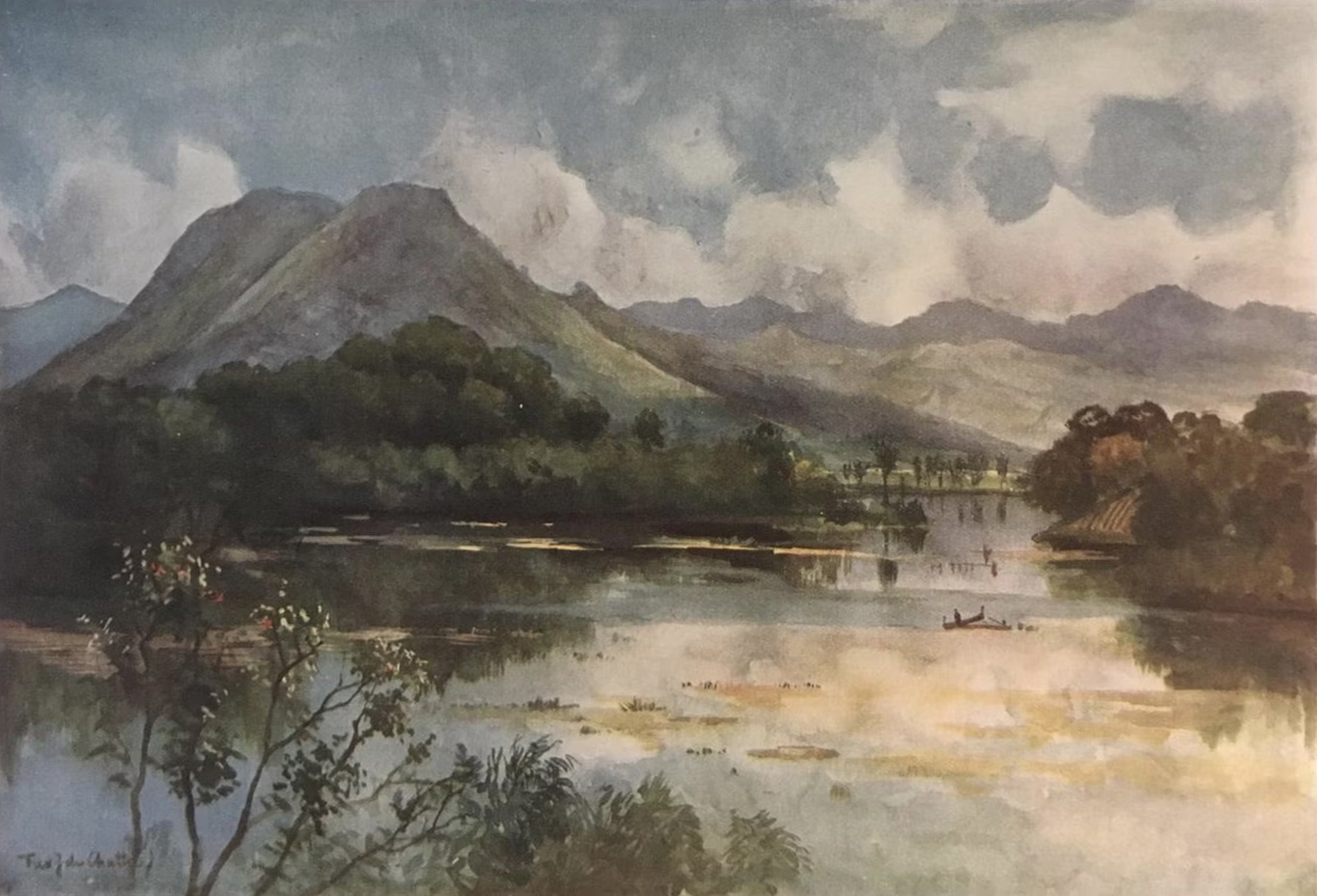
Indies Landscape (published 1913)

== Works cited ==
- Brakel, Koos van (2009). "Beautiful Indies Paintings: A Colonial Medium?". In Knol, MetaHE; Raben, Remco; Zijlmans, Kitty (eds.). Beyond the Dutch: Indonesia, the Netherlands, and the Visual Arts, from 1900 until Now. Leiden: KIT Publishers. pp. 50–59. ISBN 978-94-6022-059-3.
- "De Haagsche Salon van 1881" [The Hague Salon of 1881]. Dagblad van Zuidholland en 's Gravenhage (in Dutch). The Hague. 24 May 1881. p. 5.
- "Du Chattel†". Algemeen Handelsblad (in Dutch). Amsterdam. 13 March 1917. p. 6.
- "Du Chattel's Aquarellen" [Du Chattel's Watercolours]. De Sumatra Post (in Dutch). Medan. 10 March 1916. p. 10.
- "Een en Ander uit Midden-Java Jogja, 19 Dec. '08" [Some News from Central Java, Jogja, 19 Dec. '08]. Soerabaijasch Handelsblad (in Dutch). Surabaya. 22 December 1908. p. 5.
- "Familiebericht" [Family News]. Het Vaderland (in Dutch). The Hague. 22 September 1882. p. 4.
- "Familiebericht" [Family News]. Het Vaderland (in Dutch). The Hague. 17 September 1883. p. 8.
- "Familiebericht" [Family News]. Het Vaderland (in Dutch). The Hague. 31 August 1887. p. 4.
- "Fred. J. du Chattel". De Tijd (in Dutch). 's-Hertogenbosch. 24 April 1911. p. 3.
- "Fred. J. du Chattel". De Sumatra Post (in Dutch). Medan. 7 September 1916. p. 1.
- "Fred. van Rossum du Chattel". De Sumatra Post (in Dutch). Medan. 17 April 1917. p. 10.
- "Fredericus van Rossum du Chattel". Deli Courant (in Dutch). Medan. 30 March 1917. p. 3.
- Gram, Johan (1898). "Fredericus van Rossum du Chattel". In Rooses, Max (ed.). Het Schildersboek: Nederlandsche Schilders der Negentiende eeuw in Monographieën door Tijdgenooten [The Painters' Book: Dutch Painters of the 19th Century in Monographs by their Contemporaries]. Antwerp: De Nederlandsche Boekhandel. pp. 157–180.
- "In Memoriam: Fred. J. Du Chattel". De Sumatra Post (in Dutch). Medan. 21 March 1917. p. 1.
- "J. van Rossum du Chattel". De Preanger-bode (in Dutch). Bandung. 9 March 1917. p. 2.
- "Kunstniuews" [Art News]. Rotterdamsch Nieuwsblad (in Dutch). Rotterdam. 17 August 1915. p. 5.
- "Mas Pirngadie". Encyclopedia of Jakarta (in Indonesian). Government of Jakarta. Archived from the original on 13 December 2013.
