= Abdullah Suriosubroto =

Indonesian painter (1878–1941)

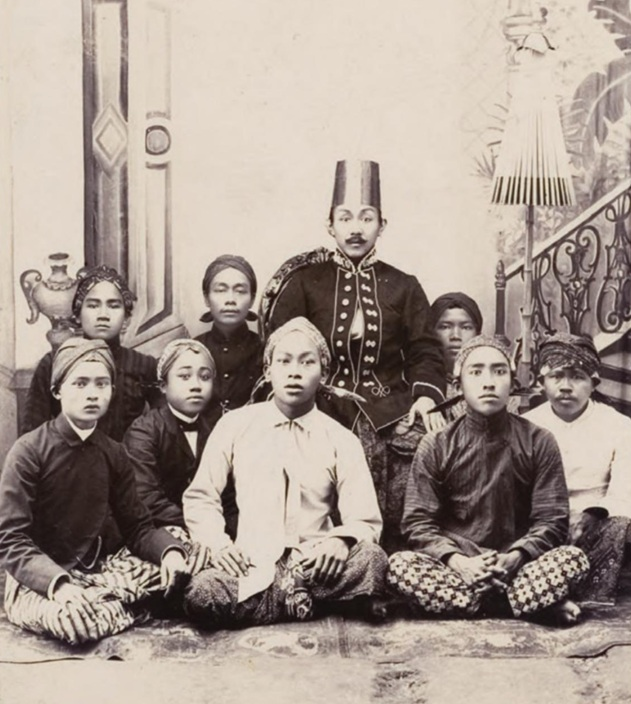
Abdullah (seated on chair) and retinue

Abdullah Suriosubroto (also Surjosubroto, 1878–c. 1941), also known as Abdullah the Elder, was an Indonesian landscape painter. The adopted son of Wahidin Soedirohoesodo, Abdullah was trained in medicine but took to art during his studies in the Netherlands. Upon returning to the Dutch East Indies (now Indonesia), he settled near Bandung and gained a reputation with the colony's Dutch population. His works have been identified as part of the Mooi Indië genre and generally dismissed in the history of Indonesian painting. Abdullah was the father of Basuki, Trijoto, and Sudjono, all of whom entered the arts.

== Biography ==
Abdullah was born in 1878 in Semarang or Surakarta on the island of Java in the Dutch East Indies (now Indonesia). He was adopted by the medical doctor Wahidin Soedirohoesodo, a nationalist who had co-founded Boedi Oetomo and was later given the title National Hero of Indonesia. In his youth, Abdullah attended medical school in Batavia (now Jakarta). To continue his studies, Abdullah was sent to the Netherlands.

However, rather than pursue a career in medicine, he decided to attend the Royal Academy of Art in The Hague, where he learned the tenets and techniques of Western painting. Upon returning to the Indies, Abdullah settled near Bandung, where he developed a reputation as a landscape painter. He later travelled to Surakarta and Yogyakarta, areas he deemed to have extraordinary natural beauty. His works were popular among the Dutch populace in the colony. He married Raden Ayu Ngadisah, with whom he had five children.

Abdullah took several students. These included painters from outside his family, such as Wahdi Sumanta, as well as his son Basuki. Abdullah's daughter Trijoto became a sculptor, while his son Sudjono was also a painter. Abdullah died in Yogyakarta in 1941 or 1942.

== Art ==
Abdullah was heavily influenced by academic art as taught in the Netherlands. He was predominantly a landscape painter, and surviving works including the areas around Priangan and Mount Merapi. The Indonesian art scholar Mikke Susanto describes Abdullah's landscapes as carefully composed, with the horizon near the centre of the canvas and a clear division between elements. Human figures are uncommon in Abdullah's works, but the impact of humanity—such as rice fields and bamboo huts—can be seen.

Writing in the newspaper Kompas, Verelladevanka Adryamarthanino and Widya Lestari Ningsih describe Abdullah as the first Indonesian painter of the twentieth century. Although the Javanese painter Raden Saleh had taken up painting and received formal training in the 19th century, no indigenous artists had followed in his footsteps. As such, Abdullah and his contemporaries Pirngadi and Wakidi were the first Indonesians to take up western art since Saleh. Of these, only Abdullah received academy training; Pirngadi and Wakidi apprenticed under European artists in the Indies.

Abdullah's works have been classified as part of the Mooi Indië genre, a style that drew from Romanticism to depict an idealized Indies. The style was heavily criticized by the painter S. Sudjojono in the 1930s, as he considered it formulaic and commercial. Since then, it has been treated dismissively in the history of Indonesian painting, and understood as a colonial art genre. Nonetheless, Abdullah's style continued to be used by his students Wahdi Sumanta and Basuki Abdullah. Works by Abdullah were held by President Sukarno.

== Selected works ==
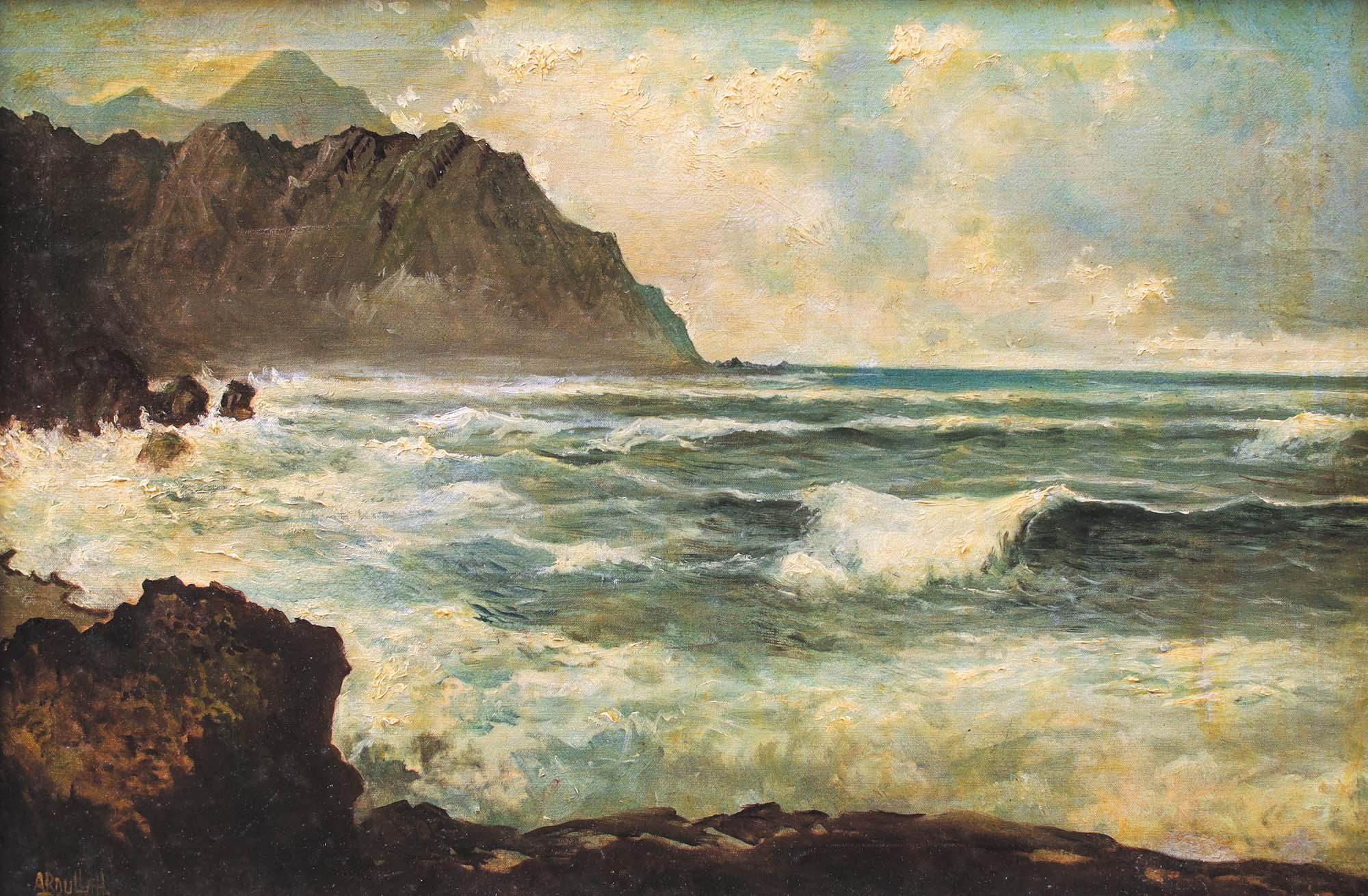
Beach (undated)

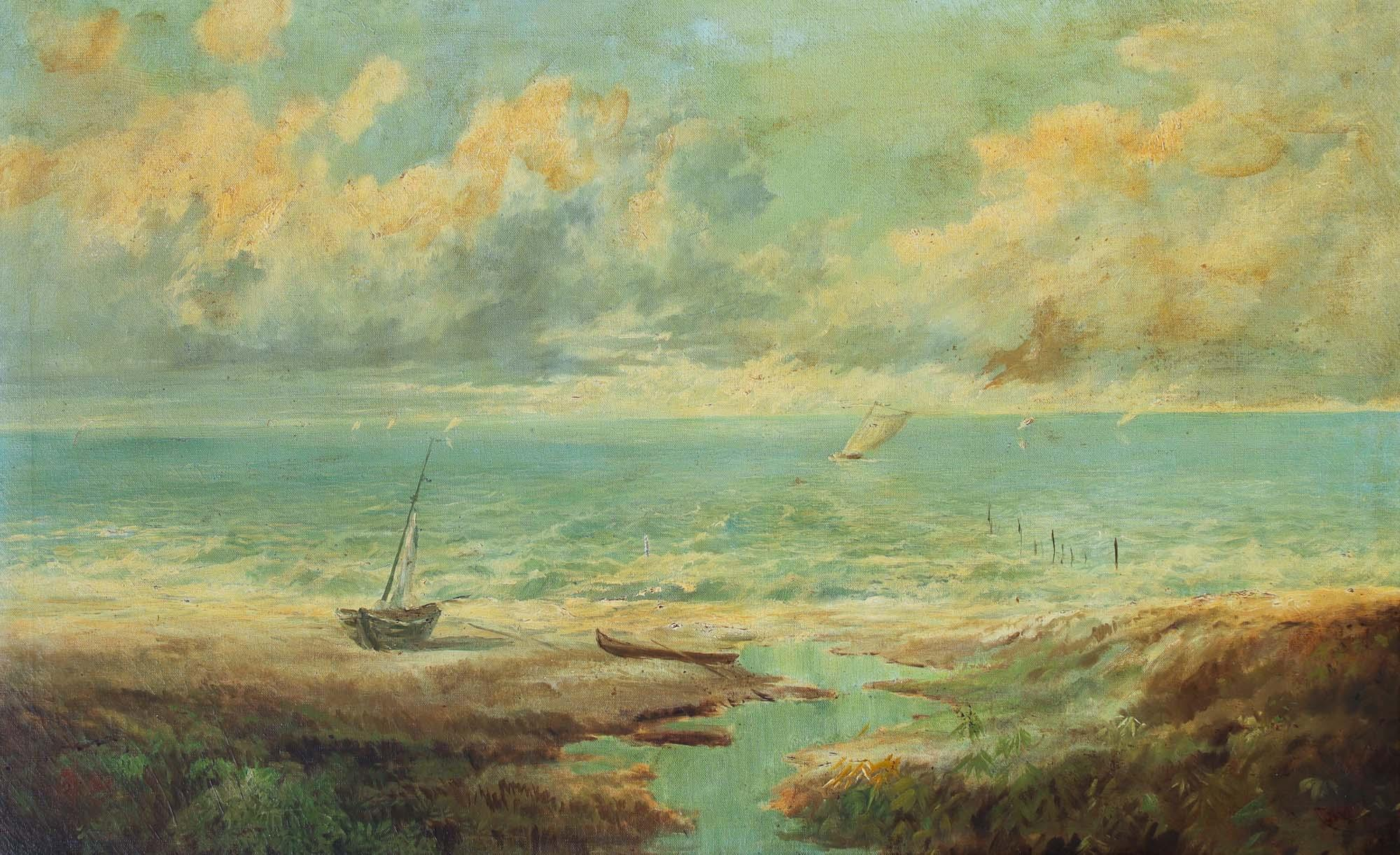
Beach (undated)

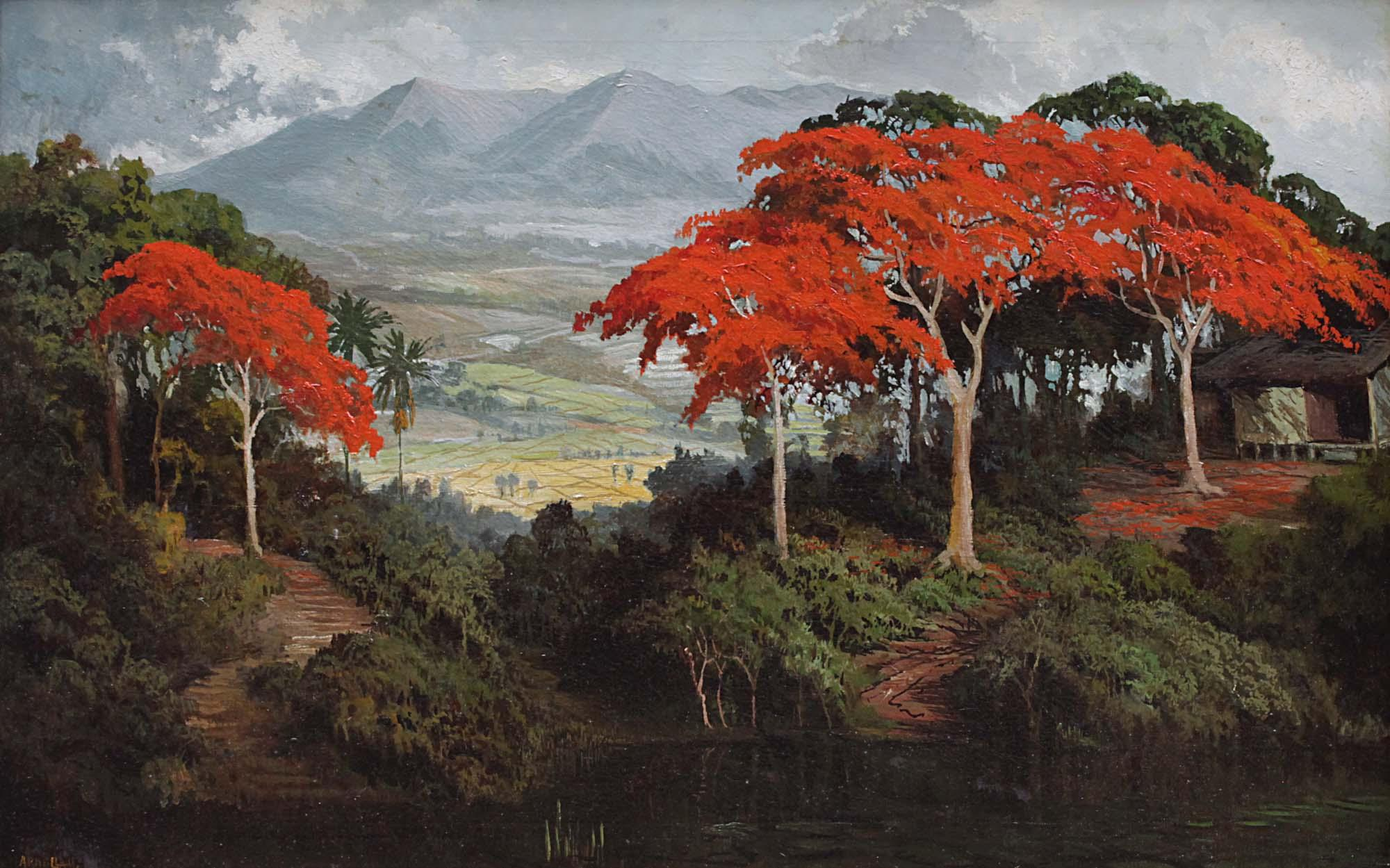
Landscape (undated)

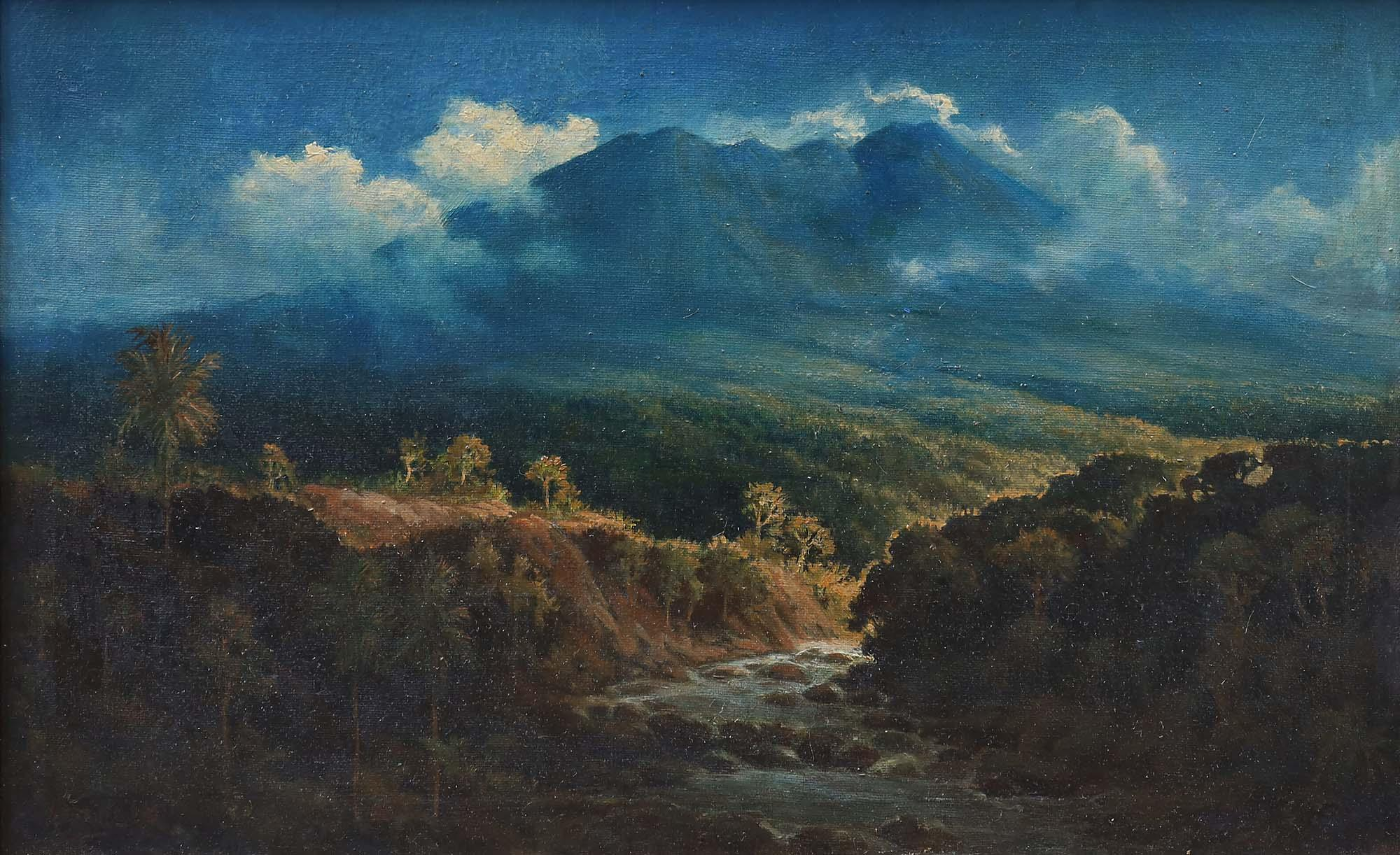
Landscape (undated)

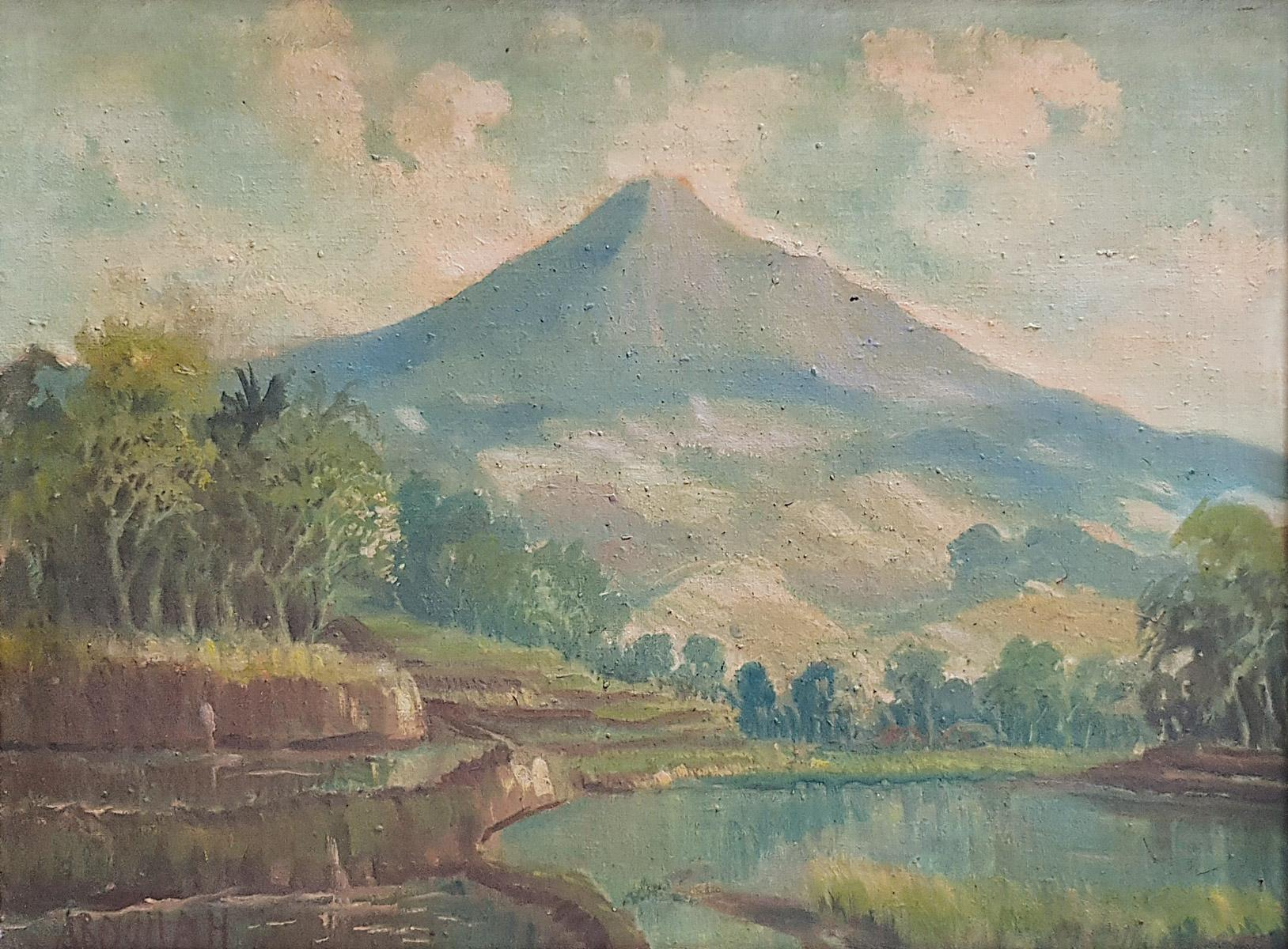
Serenity (undated)

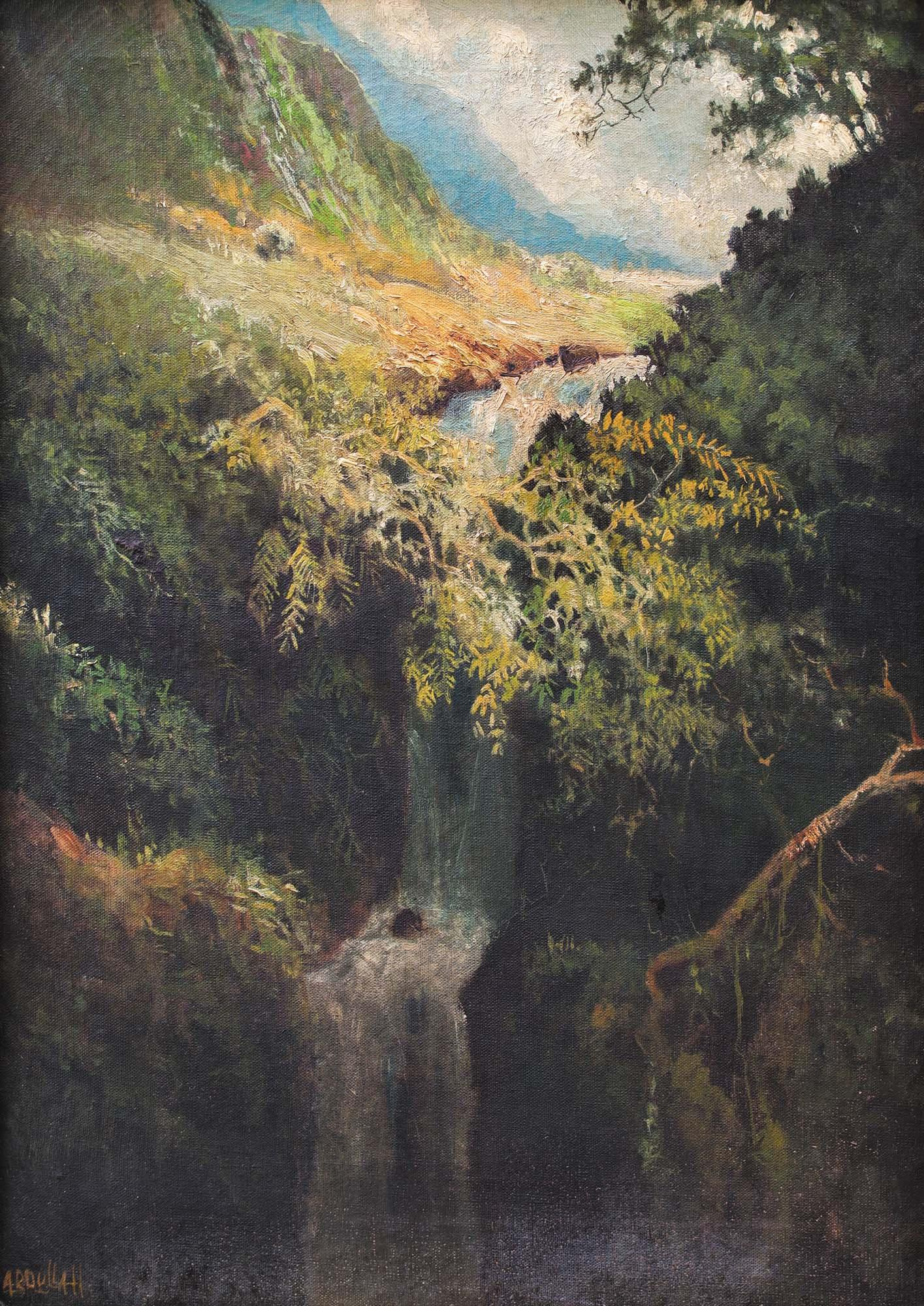
Waterfall (undated)

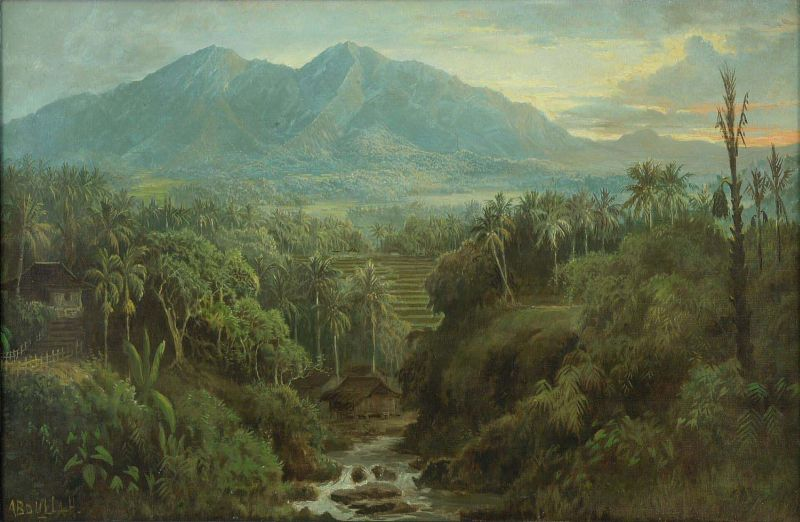
View of Priangan (c. 1935)

== Works cited ==
- Adryamarthanino, Verelladevanka; Ningsih, Widya Lestari (2 March 2022). "Abdullah Suriosubroto, Pelukis Pertama Indonesia Abad ke-20" [Abdullah Suriosubroto, the First Indonesian Painter of the 20th Century]. Kompas (in Indonesian). Archived from the original on 19 June 2024.
- Brakel, Koos van (2009). "Beautiful Indies Paintings: A Colonial Medium?". In Knol, Meta; Raben, Remco; Zijlmans, Kitty (eds.). Beyond the Dutch: Indonesia, the Netherlands, and the Visual Arts, from 1900 until Now. Leiden: KIT Publishers. pp. 50–59. ISBN 978-94-6022-059-3.
- Fischer, Joseph (1990). Modern Indonesian Art: Three Generations of Tradition and Change, 1945–1990. Jakarta and New York: Panitia Pameran KIAS and Festival of Indonesia. ISBN 978-0-295-97141-4.
- Holt, Claire (1967). Art in Indonesia: Continuities and Change. Ithaca, New York: Cornell University Press. ISBN 978-0-8014-0188-6.
- Mukhaer, Afkar Aristoteles; Thamrin, Mahandis Yoanata (18 May 2022). "Abdullah Suriosubroto, Pelopor Lukisan Mooi Indie di Hindia Belanda" [Abdullah Suriosubroto, Pioneer of Mooi Indie Paintings in the Dutch Indies]. National Geographic Indonesia. Archived from the original on 9 June 2026.
- Lusandiana, Lisistrata; Amalia, Rifda (2021). Tridjoto Abdullah: Nasionalisme Benteng Ketaton [Tridjoto Abdullah: Nationalism of the Ketaton Bull] (in Indonesian). Yogyakarta: Pusaka Seni Rupa Indonesia.
- Piyadasa, Redza (4 May 1996). "Role of 'Mooi Indie' Artists". Business Times. Kuala Lumpur. p. 20. ProQuest 266782797 – via ProQuest.
- Protschky, Susie (2017). "Landscape Painting in Indonesia: Continuity and Change in President Sukarno's Collection". In Low, Sze Wee; Flores, Patrick D. (eds.). Charting Thoughts: Essays on Art in Southeast Asia. Singapore: National Gallery Singapore. pp. 164–173. doi:10.2307/j.ctv13xpr6k.16. ISBN 978-981-11-2865-3. JSTOR j.ctv13xpr6k.16.
- Said, Julinar; Wulandari, Triana (1995). Ensiklopedi Pahlawan Nasional [Encyclopedia of National Heroes] (in Indonesian). Jakarta: Directorate General of Culture, Republic of Indonesia.
- Sanjaya, Gie (2025). "Trijoto Abdullah". Archives of Women Artists, Research, and Exhibitions. Centre Pompidou. Archived from the original on 9 June 2026.
- Wirajati, Yohanes De Britto (2023). "Kemolekan yang Ambivalen: Membaca Lukisan Mooi Indie dengan Perspektif Pascakolonialisme" [An Ambivalent Beauty: Reading Mooi Indie Paintings through a Postcolonial Perspective]. Dekonstruksi (in Indonesian). 9 (3): 69–76. doi:10.54154/dekonstruksi.v9i03.169. Archived from the original on 4 June 2026.
- Wright, Astri (1993). "Artist Roles and Meaning in Modern Indonesian Painting". In Clark, John (ed.). Modernity in Asian Art. University of Sydney East Asian Series. Vol. 7. Sydney: Wild Peony. pp. 182–199. ISBN 978-0-646-14773-4.
