= Wakidi =

Indonesian painter (c. 1890–1979)

Wakidi (c. 1890 – 26 December 1979) was an Indonesian painter associated with the Mooi Indië movement. Born to Javanese farmers in Palembang, he travelled to Bukittinggi in West Sumatra to study at its school for teachers. Wakidi spent time in Semarang, where he apprenticed to a Dutch artist, before returning to Bukittinggi. Working simultaneously as a teacher and artist, Wakidi completed approximately a thousand landscape paintings and took numerous apprentices. He sold works to several prominent political leaders, including President Sukarno, though he refused to become the official painter at the presidential palace.

== Biography ==
Wakidi was born c. 1890 in Palembang, South Sumatra, Dutch East Indies, (Note: Holt (1967, p. 330) gives "1889?". The 2003 exhibition gave Wakidi's year of birth as 1890 (Yurnaldi 2004).) to migrant farmers of Javanese heritage. He began painting at the age of ten, and in 1903 he travelled to Bukittinggi to study at a school for prospective teachers. Recognized for his artistic talents, he was sent to Semarang, Central Java, where he apprenticed with the Dutch artist van Dijk; he was also exposed to the works of Raden Saleh, whose landscapes interested him.

By 1911, Wakidi had returned to Sumatra, teaching at Bukittinggi. He married and had eleven children with his first wife. After her death in 1952, he remarried, fathering two more children. After Indonesia's independence, Wakidi was offered a position as the official painter at the presidential palace. He refused. However, his works were acquired for the palace collection, with his painting of the Sianok Canyon being acquired by President Sukarno; Wakidi was reported to have refused monetary payment, instead receiving a ticket valid for a lifetime of free travel by bus, airplane, or train. Works also entered the personal collections of government leaders such as Mohammad Hatta and Adam Malik.

Wakidi remained in Bukittinggi through the 1960s, living "away from the mainstreams of life" according to the American art historian Claire Holt. Until the 1970s, Wakidi requested that commissions be paid with gold ringgits rather than the Indonesian rupiah. Wakidi worked as a teacher until 1974, though he continued to paint in his spare time. As a teacher, his students included Mohammad Hatta as well as the novelist Motinggo Busye. As an artist, Wakidi took several students, with the Gruppo Quattro ('Group of Four') consisting of his apprentices Ar Nizar, Firman Ismail, Idran Wakidi, and Yose Rizal. Although these painters followed Wakidi's naturalist stylings, most of his other apprentices sought different approaches.

In 1979, Wakidi received an award from the Ministry of Education and Culture for his contributions to Indonesian art. Wakidi died at Dr. M. Djamil Central Hospital in Padang, West Sumatra, on 26 December 1979, three weeks after being hospitalized. It was announced that he would be buried at the Mandi Angin Cemetery in Bukittinggi.

== Legacy ==
Wakidi was reported to have completed approximately a thousand landscape paintings. Dominant colours in his works included ochre, green, and violet. Wakidi's preference for landscape paintings influenced his students, and the genre has remained prevalent among West Sumatran painters. In histories of art in West Sumatra, he is described as the first modern artist active in the region; his contemporaries Pirngadi and Abdullah Suriosubroto were active in Java.

A solo exhibition dedicated to Wakidi was held in at the Bumiminang Hotel in Padang from December 2003 until January 2004. It included eleven paintings by the artist, including depictions of the Sianok Canyon and Payakumbuh. An exhibition of works by the Gruppo Quattro was held concurrently. Works by Wakidi were displayed alongside his students' in a 2005 exhibition at the Inna Muara Hotel. A 2016 exhibition at the Gajah Gallery in Singapore, titled "The Light Before Dusk", was dedicated to the works of Wakidi. The gallery also included works by Wakidi in its 2023 exhibition "Beyond Borders: Minangkabau Art and the Fluidity of Cultural Dynamics".

The style embraced by Wakidi and his contemporaries was decried by the painter S. Sudjojono in the 1930s. He denounced these artists as the "Beautiful Indies" (Mooi Indië) school, arguing that their art was based around a "holy trinity" of mountains, coconut palms, and rice fields. To promote a less idealized art, Sudjojono and his contemporary Agus Djaya co-established the Indonesian Painters Association (Persatuan Ahli Gambar Indonesia; PERSAGI).

== Works cited ==
- "Beyond Borders". Gajah Gallery. 2023. Archived from the original on 25 July 2026.
- Bruhn, Katherine L. (2018). "Community and the Rantau: West Sumatran Artists in Indonesia's Art World". Southeast of Now: Directions in Contemporary and Modern Art in Asia. 2 (2): 119–142. doi:10.1353/sen.2018.0004.
- "Masih Ada Corak 'Mooi Indie'" [Still a Trace of the 'Beautiful Indies']. Kompas (in Indonesian). 24 December 2005. Archived from the original on 29 September 2007.
- "Meninggal Dunia" [Died]. Tempo (in Indonesian). Vol. 9, no. 45. 5 January 1980. p. 20.
- Holt, Claire (1967). Art in Indonesia: Continuities and Change. Ithaca, New York: Cornell University Press. ISBN 978-0-8014-0188-6.
- "Wakidi: The Light Before Dusk". Gajah Gallery. 2016. Archived from the original on 25 July 2026.
- Yurnaldi (11 January 2004). "Mata Batin Wakidi" [The Mind's Eye of Wakidi]. Kompas (in Indonesian). Archived from the original on 15 January 2004.
