= Ernest Dezentjé =

Dutch painter (1885–1972)

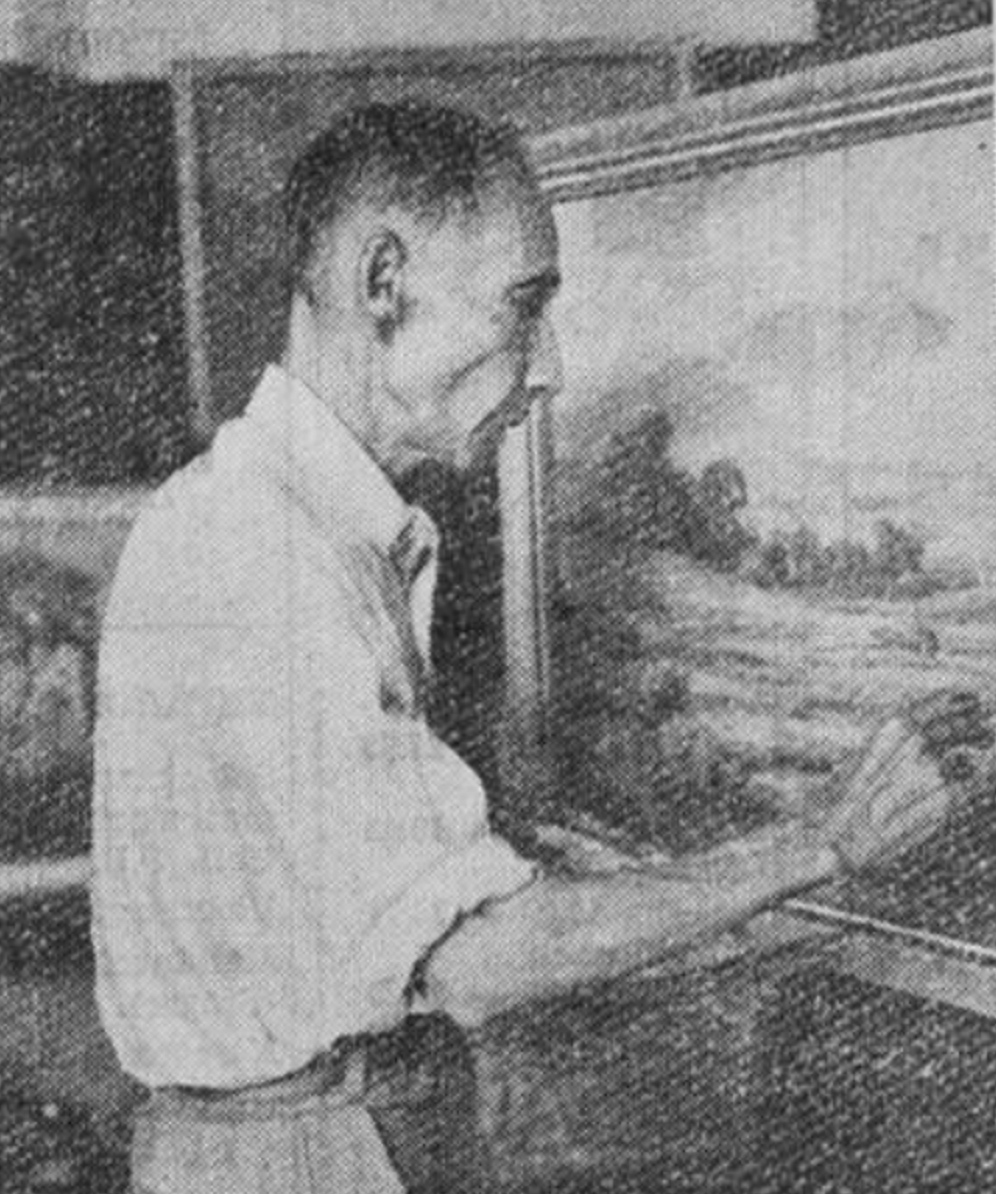
- Dezentjé, 1956
- Born: Ernest Regnard Leonce Dezentjé; 17 August 1885 (Note: Some sources, such as NRC Handelsblad (1972, p. 6) and Protschky (2011, p. 83), give 1884.); Meester Cornelis, Batavia, Dutch East Indies
- Died: 12 January 1972 (aged 86); Bogor, West Java, Indonesia
- Movement: Mooi Indië

Ernest Regnard Leonce Dezentjé (17 August 1885 – 12 January 1972) was a Dutch-Indonesian painter. Dezentjé worked for the office of the auditor general until the 1910s, when he took up painting and began learning from established artists such as Leo Eland and Gerard Pieter Adolfs. Dezentjé joined the Kuntskring ('Batavia Art Circle') and was exhibiting by the 1920s, gaining popularity for his depiction of Mount Gede. By 1940 he had held several solo exhibitions and was acknowledged as one of the most important artists of the Dutch East Indies. He remained active through the 1970s, establishing a close friendship with President Sukarno and taking several apprentices.

Dezentjé was best known for his landscape paintings, which emphasized natural beauty and lighting, and is considered part of the Mooi Indië (lit. 'Beautiful Indies') movement. Reception of his works was initially positive, though later critics questioned his formulaic presentation and use of perspective. Paintings by Dezentjé are exhibited at the Merdeka and Bogor Palaces and held by several museums.

== Biography ==
Ernest Dezentjé was born in Meester Cornelis, Batavia, Dutch East Indies (now Jatinegara, Jakarta, Indonesia) on 17 August 1885. He was the third of eight children born to Leon Caspar Dezentjé and his wife Wilhelmina (née Reijnhart). He was descended from a prominent Indo family, with French, Dutch, and Javanese heritage. Dezentjé was educated in Batavia, where he completed his secondary studies. Initially, Dezentjé worked for the office of the auditor general, following a career path determined by his father.

However, at the age of 30, Dezentjé chose to take up painting against his parents' wishes. He received instruction from contemporaries, learning from the landscape painter Leo Eland as well as other artists such as Gerard Pieter Adolfs. He also spent time at an art academy in Europe. He later joined the Kuntskring ('Batavia Art Circle'), and participated in a joint exhibition at the Trade Fair in Bandung in 1920. In 1922, he received a commission from the Koninklijke Paketvaart-Maatschappij shipping line to complete a 1.8-by-2.5-metre (5 ft 11 in × 8 ft 2 in) view of Mount Gede.

His painting of Mount Gede was well-received, and Dezentjé began to gain a following. Upon the betrothal of Princess Juliana of the Netherlands to Prince Bernhard in 1936, one of Dezentjé's paintings was presented to the couple as a gift from the people of Batavia. Between 1936 and 1939 Dezentjé held several solo exhibitions in Batavia. Governor General Bonifacius Cornelis de Jonge attended his 1936 exhibition at the Kolff Bookstore. The 1938 exhibition at Kolff, meanwhile, consisted of some fifty paintings. In 1940, Dezentjé held an exhibition at the Kunstzaal-Kollf in Batavia. He exhibited another forty works at the Kolff Gallery the following year.

Dezentjé married Siti Rasmani, with whom he lived in the Bondongan district of Bogor. After Indonesia's independence, he took Indonesian citizenship. When he and Siti were unable to conceive, they adopted her nephew Satria Djupriyani, who later became an artist.

Dezentjé was reported to be a close friend of President Sukarno, having established their relationship before Indonesia's independence. According to the curator Dullah, Sukarno regularly visited Dezentjé at his home, and entrusted his eldest son Guntur to the artist after the Dutch began their Police Actions during the Indonesian National Revolution. The president also asked Dezentjé to curate his art collection, and would regularly commission new works for display. In his Catatan Pinggir 9 ('Notes from the Margins 9'), the Indonesian poet Goenawan Mohammad described Sukarno as "enjoying Dezentjé's works as he enjoyed the sculptures of women with harmonious bodies". (Note: Original: "Sukarno menggemari karya Dezentje sebagaimana ia menggemari patung perempuan yang bertubuh harmonis.")

Dezentjé died on 12 January 1972. He was buried next to his wife in Muara Kidul, West Bogor. Prior to his death, he had been working in Jakarta with his adopted son.

== Art ==
Rice Field in Java (1925)

Dezentjé is best known for his landscape paintings, though by the 1940s he had also begun painting figures. In a 1956 interview, he recalled that he had produced hundreds of works. His paintings were completed in an impressionist style, with little influence from modernism; when pressured to adopt the tenets of modern art, Dezentjé refused. In a 1938 article, the Bataviaasch Nieuwsblad described his creative process:

When [Dezentjé] sees a panorama that pleases him, he sets to work diligently. The smaller details—a small bridge, a kampong road, a cottage hidden in the trees—he will not skip on his journey through the landscape. However, his true painter's art emerges only from the great, wide vistas, in which he can work with the various planes of foreground and background, central lighting, and the shadows of the clouds on the hillsides. Then he directs the interplay of light and skies, for with Dezentjé, the panorama is always nature's stage. (Note: Original: "Als 'Nes' een panorama ziet dat hem bevalt, begint hij eerst goed te werken. De kleinere stukjes, een bruggetje, een kampongweg, een huisje in de boomen verscholen, hij zal ze niet overslaan op zijn tocht door het landschap, maar de echte schilderskocrts komt toch eerst bij de groote wijde vergezichten, waarin hij kan werken met de verschillende plans van voor- en achtergrond, centrale belichting en schaduw van de bewolking op de heuvelflanken. Dan voert hij de regie over het spel vpn licht en luchten, want bij Dezentjé is het panorama ook steeds een soort schouwtooneel der natuur.")

Common subjects of Dezentjé's works included rice fields, mountains, rivers, and indigenous villages. His works emphasized the natural beauty of the archipelago, and thus he is considered part of the Mooi Indië (lit. 'Beautiful Indies') movement. He was recognized for his use of light, with De Indische Courant highlighting his depiction of light reflecting off rice paddies in a 1938 review.

Dezentjé was considered one of the most important artists of the Dutch East Indies, and his name was synonymous with the Mooi Indië movement. He took several apprentices, including the Dutch painter William Halewijn and the Indonesian academic Koentjaraningrat. Works by Dezentjé are held by the Indonesian government at the Merdeka Palace and Bogor Palace. Dezentjé's paintings are in the collection of the Wereldmuseum Amsterdam in the Netherlands and the Adam Malik Museum in Jakarta. At the time of his death, works were also held in the United States and the Soviet Union.

In 1938, the Bataviaasch Nieuwsblad described Dezentjé as creating a "spectacle for the eye" that "captivates the eye and the heart", (Note: Original: "... lustspel voor het oog... het oog en het hart bekoort") putting greater emphasis on natural beauty than the psychological experience of human actions. De Indische Courant, reviewing his 1938 exhibition, wrote that Dezentjé "is a good painter in the best sense of the word", having an expressiveness best demonstrated by his large canvases. (Note: Original: "Dezentjé is een goed schilder 'in den besten zin des woords; hij schijnt ons in zijn werk sterker van expressiviteit geworden, wat zijn groote doeken wel 't beste bewijzen.") Reviewing Dezentjé's 1939 exhibition, the Bataviaasch Nieuwsblad was more critical, writing that, while the artist was at his best with carefree depictions of sunny rivers and kampong roads, his works lacked the strength of perspective and form expected of naturalism. Meanwhile, the Dutch art critic Johannes Tielrooy criticized Dezentjé's work as formulaic, writing "the water glistens like silver, the little dykes are green ... a mountain in the background, and this mountain—you can count on that—is dark blue. The mandatory palm tree is in the picture too, and in the heavens in the distance yearning yellows melt into poetic red." At the same time, he considered Dezentjé to have put much thought into "creating a soft, tender mood".

== Works cited ==
- Andersen, H. W. (18 April 1956). "Ernest Dezentje, Autodidaktisch Schilder" [Ernest Dezentje, Self-Taught Painter]. De Nieuwsgier (in Dutch). Jakarta. p. 3.
- Brakel, Koos van (2009). "Beautiful Indies Paintings: A Colonial Medium?". In Knol, Meta; Raben, Remco; Zijlmans, Kitty (eds.). Beyond the Dutch: Indonesia, the Netherlands, and the Visual Arts, from 1900 until Now. Leiden: KIT Publishers. pp. 50–59. ISBN 978-94-6022-059-3.
- "Dankbetuiging Prinses Juliana" [Gratitude from Princess Juliana]. Het Nieuws van den dag voor Nederlandsch-Indië (in Dutch). 3 December 1936. p. 6.
- "Ernes Dezentjé [sic]". Algemeen Handelsblad voor Nederlandsch-Indië (in Dutch). Semarang. 28 May 1936. p. 7.
- "Ernest Dezentjé". Bataviaasch Nieuwsblad (in Dutch). Batavia. 8 March 1922. p. 2.
- "Ernest Dezentjé Overleden" [Ernest Dezentjé Dies]. NRC Handelsblad (in Dutch). Rotterdam. 26 January 1972. p. 6.
- "Kunst E. Dezentjé in de Kunstzaal G. Kolff & Co" [Art by E. Dezentjé at the G. Kolff and Co. Art Exhibition]. Bataviaasch Nieuwsblad (in Dutch). Batavia. 20 May 1938. p. 4.
- "Kunst en Letteren: Schilderkunst Jaarbeurstentoonstelling" [Arts and Literature: Paintings at the Trade Fair]. De Locomotief (in Dutch). Semarang. 18 May 1920. p. 2.
- "Kunst: Ernest Dezentjé" [Art: Ernest Dezentjé]. Bataviaasch Nieuwsblad (in Dutch). Batavia. 17 May 1941. p. 3.
- Kurnia, Amalia Nurhidayah (18 September 2025). "Ernest Dezentjé, Pelukis Bogor yang Jadi Sahabat Dekat Bung Karno" [Ernest Dezentjé, the Bogor Painter who Was a Close Friend of Bung Karno]. Viva News (in Indonesian). Archived from the original on 26 July 2026.
- Protschky, Susie (2011). Images of the Tropics: Environment and Visual Culture in Colonial Indonesia. Verhandelingen van het Koninklijk Instituut voor Taal-, Land- en Volkenkunde. Vol. 270. Leiden: Brill. ISBN 978-90-67-18368-0.
- Riyanto, Hevi (11 November 2023). "Ernest Dezentje, Pelukis Mooi Indie dan Kawan Karib Sukarno" [Ernest Dezentje, Mooi Indie Painter and Close Friend of Sukarno]. Tirto.id (in Indonesian). Archived from the original on 26 July 2026.
- "Schilderijen-Expositie: Ernest Dezentjé" [Painting Exposition: Ernest Dezentjé]. De Indische Courant (in Dutch). Batavia. 28 May 1938. p. 13.
- "Schilderijen-Tentoonstelling: Ernest Dezentjé" [Painting Exhibition: Ernest Dezentjé]. Bataviaasch Nieuwsblad (in Dutch). Batavia. 20 December 1939. p. 2.
- "Schilderijen-Tentoonstelling: Ernest Dezentjé" [Painting Exhibition: Ernest Dezentjé]. De Indische Courant (in Dutch). Batavia. 22 November 1940. p. 2.
- The Journey of Indonesian Painting: The Bentara Budaya Collection. Jakarta: Kepustakaan Populer Gramedia. 2008. ISBN 978-979-9101-20-4.
- Yuliastuti, Dian (25 June 2023). "Koentjaraningrat Sebagai Seniman" [Koentjaraningrat as an Artist]. Tempo (in Indonesian). Archived from the original on 26 July 2026.
