= Tanja Dezentjé =

Tanja Dezentjé (Tatiana Eleonora Catharina Charlotte Dezentjé, July 8, 1918 – 1982) was a Dutch woman who fought for the Indonesian National Revolution against the Netherlands. Her mother Eleonara Kinzler was from Belarus and her father Henri Charles Dezentjé son of rich sugar plantation owners in the Dutch East Indies. After the Indonesian Independence she became a diplomat for the Republic of Indonesia. She is featured in the exhibition "Revolusi" at the Dutch Rijksmuseum.

== Youth ==
Tanya was born on July 8, 1918, in The Hague, although there seems to be some confusion in the sources. When her father died when she was still very young, her mother moved in with her brother in Argentina. When subsequently her mother died she moved to live with her grandmother in Belgium and later The Hague. At that point she already spoke Russian, Malay, French and Dutch. She ended up traveling a lot. She had married three times by the time the Japanese invaded Indonesia. First when she was 16 with a prins from Java, later with an indo-Chinese man and finally with William MacGillavry who was killed during the Japanese occupation. She had a child with each husband.

== During the War ==
The Dutch intelligence bureau NEFIS portrayed her as a spy and traitor who supported the Japanese. The Occupying Japanese forces however arrested her and her husband as spies and killed her husband. She took Indonesian citizenship (warga-negara) shortly after the war.

== After the war and independence ==
When Sukarno declared independence in 1945, Dezentjé worked for the radio station Voice of Free Indonesia in Yogyakarta, which she did in Dutch and French. Because she also spoke Russian, Italian, Spanish and English, she was soon after this also sent out as a diplomat to plead for the Indonesian independence. She was part of the Indonesian delegation for the Asian Relations Conference in 1947. She leads an active but unhappy life traveling and holding speeches defending the role of women in the republic. In 1948 she marries the Indian diplomat Mohammed Abdul, but the marriage only lasts a few years. When Tanya Dezentjé returns to the republic many things have changed and few of her friends are still in power. She does get supported by her old friends Hatta, Roem en Rubiono. She died at the age of 66 in 1982.
