= Wim Dooijewaard =

Dutch painter

- Born: 7 October 1892; Amsterdam, Netherlands
- Died: 17 July 1980 (aged 87); Blaricum, Netherlands
- Occupation: Painter

Wim Dooijewaard (7 October 1892 – 17 July 1980) was a Dutch painter. His work was part of the painting event in the art competition at the 1936 Summer Olympics.
