= Piet Ouborg =

Dutch artist

Piet or Pieter Ouborg (10 March 1893, in Dordrecht – 3 June 1956, in The Hague) was a Dutch artist. He started out in life as a teacher; this profession was threatened with interruption by the outbreak of World War I when Ouborg was liable to enlistment. He managed to evade military service by taking up a teaching position in the Dutch East Indies. While there, Ouborg took up drawing and painting. Returning to the Netherlands after the war, Ouborg found himself drawn to the work of Vincent van Gogh. In 1923 he began to experiment with painting in the Cubist style. In 1931, Ouborg visited Brussels and found himself drawn towards surrealism. During World War II and its immediate aftermath, Ouborg was drawn increasingly into the circle of the COBRA (avant-garde movement) and its members such as Karel Appel and Corneille.

== Early life ==
Ouborg was born into an environment as far removed from art as possible. His father ran a storekeeper and bookkeeper. Ouborg's life was hard due to the fact that his family was a large one. He was one of ten children and his parents could not provided amply for all of them. His family was a strict Protestant.
