= Basuki Abdullah =

Indonesian painter

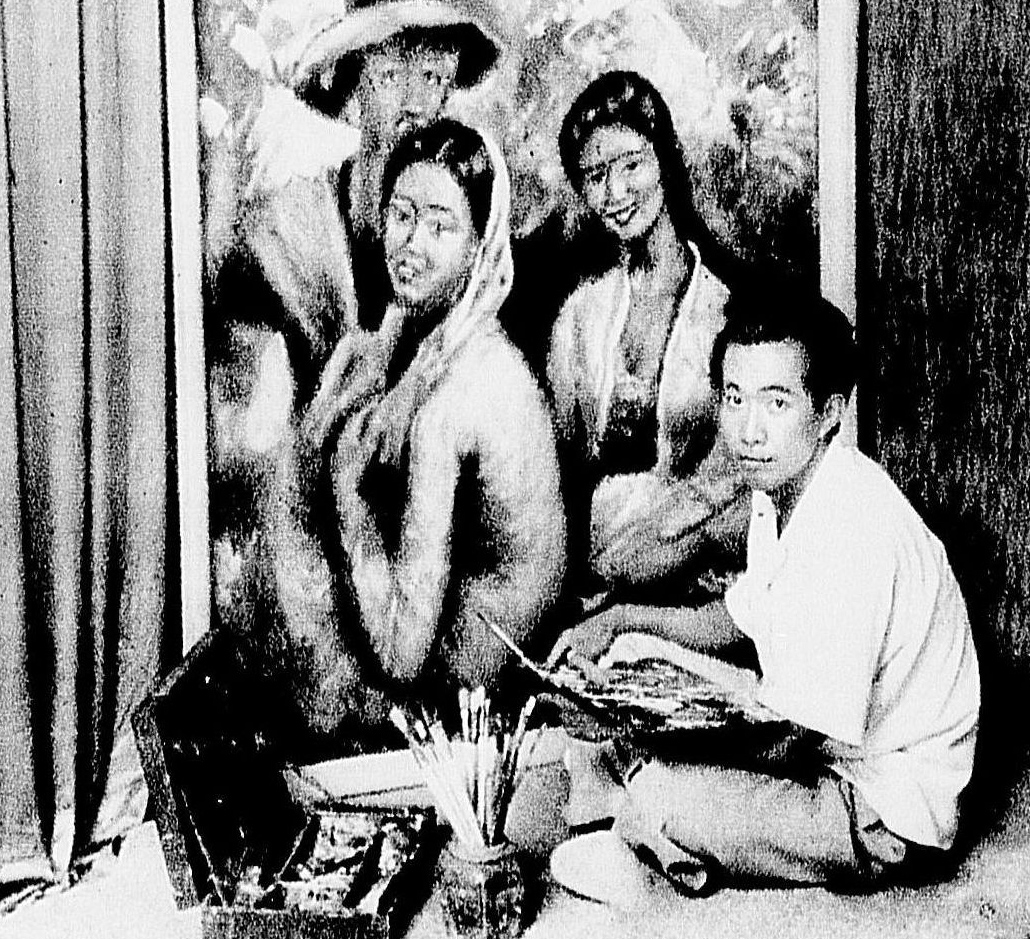
- Basuki Abdullah in 1943
- Born: Muhammad Basuki Abdullah; 25 January 1915; Surakarta, Dutch East Indies
- Died: 5 November 1993 (aged 78); Jakarta, Indonesia
- Education: Hollandsch-Inlandsche School; Meer Uitgebreid Lager Onderwijs; Royal Academy of Art, The Hague, Royal International Certificate of Art (RIA), 1933
- Occupation: Painter
- Movement: Realism
- Spouses: Josephine; Maria Michel; Nataya Nareerat
- Children: Saraswati; Cecillia Sidhawati
- Parent: Abdullah Suriosubroto

Fransiskus Xaverius Basuki Abdullah (born Muhammad Basuki Abdullah, 25 January 1915 – 5 November 1993) was an Indonesian painter and a convert to Roman Catholicism from Islam. His work is characterized as realism and has been exhibited in the Indonesian National Gallery. He received formal training in The Hague. During the Japanese occupation of the Dutch East Indies he was an art teacher. After the war he became known internationally, winning an art contest on the occasion of the accession in the Netherlands of Queen Juliana. His status in Indonesia provided an opportunity to paint the official portrait of President Suharto. Abdullah was beaten to death by three assailants during a break-in at his Jakarta home.

== See also ==
- Basoeki Abdullah Museum
