= Bumi Tarung =

Indonesian artist collective

Bumi Tarung (lit. 'battleground' or 'arena') is an Indonesian sanggar (artist collective). Established in 1961 by a group of students at the Indonesian Academy of Arts in Yogyakarta, the group worked closely with the leftist Institute for People's Culture (Lekra), an affiliate of the Communist Party of Indonesia (PKI). It embraced a style of socialist realism that explicitly illustrated class antagonism, showing empathy for the proletariat and urging an uprising against the bourgeoisie. Members emphasized the belief that art had to serve the common people, and were critical of artists such as Paul Klee, Piet Mondrian, and Jackson Pollock.

After a failed coup attempt by the 30 September Movement in 1965, members of Bumi Tarung—including Amrus Natalsya, Djoko Pekik, and Misbach Tamrin—were arrested and held without trial during a multi-year communist purge. They continued to paint, however, and after the fall of the New Order regime in 1998 they reunited and planned new exhibitions. Since then, Bumi Tarung has hosted exhibitions in 2008, 2011, 2015, and 2024. As of 2024, only two of its members survive.

== History ==
=== Establishment and political activities ===
Bumi Tarung was established in Gamping, Yogyakarta, Indonesia, in mid-1961, at a time when political tensions in Indonesia were rising. The group was founded by Amrus Natalsya, who led it through 1963, in conjunction with Ngajarbana Sembiring, Misbach Tamrin, Kuslan Budiman, Isa Asanda, and Djoko Pekik; other members included Sutopo, Adrianus Gumelar, Sabri Djamal, Hardjija Pudjanadi, Harmani, and Haryatno. Another artist who joined later was Itji Tarmizi, formerly of Pelukis Rakjat (lit. 'People's Painters').

Most of Bumi Tarung's members were students of the Indonesian Academy of Arts (now the Indonesia Institute of the Arts Yogyakarta), and the collective opened their studio at a former lime kiln across from the academy's campus. The community held its debut exhibition at Balai Budaya Jakarta from 12 to 19 October 1962. The exhibition consisted of 35 works by fourteen members, and included 3 paintings by Natalsya that depicted farmers as victims of the feudal system. His Kawan-Kawanku ('My Friends', 1958) was acquired by President Sukarno and held in the presidential collection.

As in the larger collectives Seniman Indonesia Muda ('Young Artists of Indonesia', SIM) and Pelukis Rakjat, the artists associated with Bumi Tarung were predominantly leftists. All three groups operated under the philosophy of "art for the people". To better understand the lives of the common people, members of Bumi Tarung would spend time living among them. Natalsja and Pekik both spent several months in Lampung, Sumatra, living with transmigrants there. Pekik also lived among the people of Trisik Beach in southern Yogyakarta. From these experiences, Natalsja produced a sculpture that he sold to Duta Hotel in Jakarta.

Bumi Tarung, however, was more overtly political than its larger contemporaries. It embraced a doctrine of sustained struggle against the forces of imperialism and capitalism. In this, its members worked closely with the leftist Institute for People's Culture (Lekra), an affiliate of the Communist Party of Indonesia (PKI). When the sculptor Gregorius Sidharta signed the Cultural Manifesto, which opposed the tenets of social realism in favour of a universal humanism, Bumi Tarung members accused him of being a bourgeoisie agent; continued pressure from Lekra-affiliated artists resulted in Sidharta leaving the Indonesian Academy of Arts and moving to Bandung.

=== Collapses and resurgence ===
After a failed coup attempt by the 30 September Movement in 1965, which was blamed on the PKI, the Indonesian government began a multi-year communist purge. Many of Bumi Tarung's members were arrested and detained between 1965 and 1968. (Note: Itji Tarmizi fled Java to live in Bukittinggi, West Sumatra (The Jakarta Post 2001, p. 1).) Those caught were held without trial as political prisoners in prisons and concentration camps. Meanwhile, works by the artists were hidden away, with Kawan-Kawanku only resurfacing in 2011. Recalling his imprisonment in Yogyakarta, Djoko Pekik wrote, "Detention and imprisonment, it was perhaps inevitable in that political climate. ... Thus, we accepted it, even as we tried to survive. We embraced the principle of accepting that which had come." (Note: Original: "Penangkapan dan pemenjaraan itu agaknya niscaya dalam dunia politik. Karena memang begitu situasinya. Oleh sebab itu kami hanya pasrah, sambil mencoba terus bertahan. Kami tak mendendam kepada keadaan, karena kami berprinsip sing wis yo wis. Yang sudah ya, sudahlah.)

Members of Bumi Tarung continued to paint. After release, some were used as cheap artistic labour, with Tamrin reduced to painting urban arches in Banjarmasin by 1991. Meanwhile, Djoko Pekik remained critical of Indonesia's ruling elite through the 1990s, with the political scientist Andre Vltchek considering Bumi Tarung to be the best Indonesian example of resistance through the visual arts. With the fall of the New Order regime in 1998, Natalsya and Tamrin sought to work together again; Tamrin recalled his colleague as saying, "If not, it'd be better to be a buffalo." (Note: Original: "Kalau tidak lebih baik jadi kerbau".) Although many communist-linked organizations had been forcibly dissolved and formally banned, Bumi Tarung had not. Consequently, members collaborated on a new exhibition in 2008, their first in 46 years.

Curated by Bambang Subarnas and held at the National Gallery of Indonesia, the exhibition consisted of ninety works from several Bumi Tarung painters. Themes varied, with works including a depiction of an extrajudicial killing by Sudiyono, Chinatowns by Natalsja, and critiques of Suharto by Djoko Pekik. Further exhibitions were held in 2011 and 2015; Djoko Pekik also held a solo exhibition in 2015. In June–July 2024, Sampai Batas Tarung ('Til the Ends of Battle'), an exhibition of works by and inspired by Bumi Tarung, was held at the National Gallery of Indonesia. By this point, only two members—Misbach Tamrin and Andrianus Gumelar—remained, and thus the exhibition was expected to be the collective's last.

== Art and philosophy ==
Bumi Tarung was best known for works of socialist realism that explicitly illustrated class antagonism, showing empathy for the proletariat and urging an uprising against the oppressive bourgeoisie. Works focused particularly on the issues affecting labourers and farmers. Titles included Pekerja yang Membangun Kota ('The Workers Building the City'), Petani yang Diusir dari Tanah Garapannya ('Farmer Run Off His Own Land', both Amrus Natalsja, 1961), and Matinya Seorang Tuan Tanah ('Death of a Landlord', Djoko Pekik, 1964).

Conceptually, Bumi Tarung promoted the "1-5-1" principle introduced by Nyoto and promoted by Lekra, whereby politics was understood as the singular force unifying the expansion/dissemination of creative works, ideology/art, good traditions/revolutionary modernity, individual creativity/mass wisdom, and social realism/revolutionary romanticism. Under this philosophy, all artists needed to turun ke bawah ('reach below'), i.e., draw their inspirations from the common people and use their art to advance public interests. Members criticized modern art as ineffectual in advancing the needs of the people, understood only by the intelligentsia and upper classes. In the newspaper Harian Rakjat, Misbach Tamrin criticized artists such as Paul Klee, Piet Mondrian, and Jackson Pollock as emphasizing form over content, thereby producing works little different than textile patterns.

== Notable members ==
- Amrus Natalsya
- Kuslan Budiman
- Misbach Tamrin
- Itji Tarmizi

== Works cited ==
- Astuti, Tia Agnes (23 June 2024). "Gak Lekang Waktu, Sanggar Bumi Tarung Eksis Lagi di Jakarta!" [Not Forgotten by Time, Bumi Tarung Returns to Jakarta!]. Detik.com (in Indonesian). Archived from the original on 20 November 2026.
- Astuti, Tia Agnes (24 June 2024). "Sejarah Kelam Sanggar Bumi Tarung" [The Dark History of Bumi Tarung]. Detik.com (in Indonesian). Archived from the original on 20 November 2026.
- Bujono, Bambang (30 June 2008). "Bumi Tarung, 46 Tahun Kemudian" [Bumi Tarung, 46 Years Later]. Tempo (in Indonesian). 37 (19): 81.
- Burhan, M. Agus (2013). Seni Lukis Indonesia Masa Jepang Sampai Lekra [Indonesian Painting from the Japanese Period through Lekra]. Surakarta: UNS Press. ISBN 978-979-498-834-3.
- Dermawan T, Agus (11 July 2024). "Nasib Murung Bumi Tarung" [The Sad Fate of Bumi Tarung] (in Indonesian). Borobudur Writers' Festival. Archived from the original on 20 November 2026.
- "Elusive Tarmizi Stages Solo Exhibition". The Jakarta Post. Jakarta. 29 November 2001. p. 1 – via ProQuest.
- Roosa, John (2006). Pretext for Mass Murder: The September 30th Movement and Suharto's Coup D'état in Indonesia. Madison: University of Wisconsin Press. ISBN 978-0-299-22030-3.
- "Sanggar Bumi Tarung, Studio that Fights against Oppression". Tempo. 2 October 2013. Archived from the original on 20 November 2026.
- Sim, Gerald (4 September 2020). "Itji Tarmizi: The Missing Link". National Gallery Singapore. Archived from the original on 21 September 2026.
- Vltchek, Andre (2012). Indonesia: Archipelago of Fear. London: Pluto Press. ISBN 978-1-84964-740-3.
