= Trubus Sudarsono =

Indonesian artist (1924–1966)

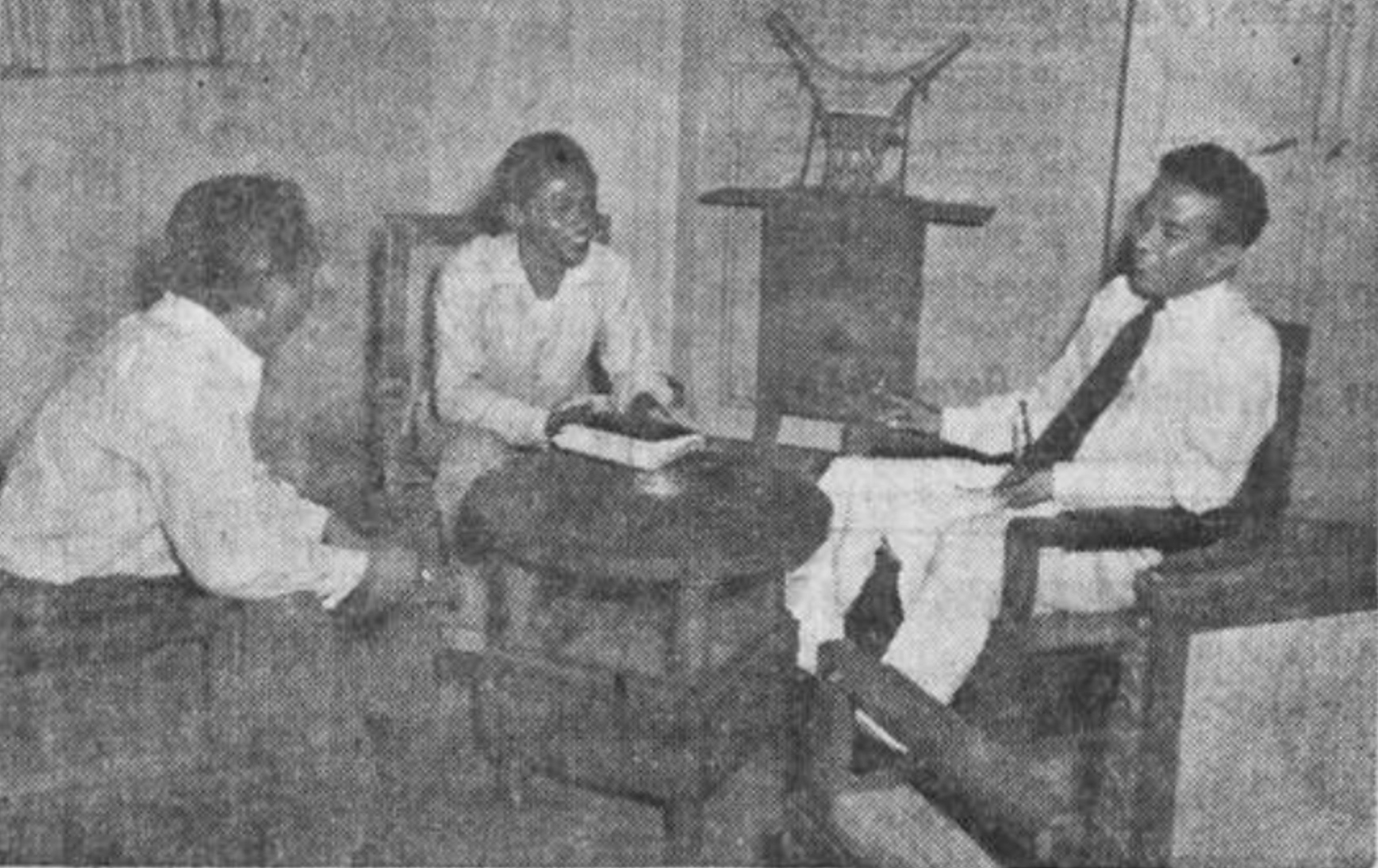
- Trubus (centre) speaking with Nasroen A.S. (right), 1954
- Born: 23 April 1926; Wates, Adikarta, Dutch East Indies
- Died: c. 1966
- Style: realist
- Movement: Pelukis Rakjat

Troeboes Soedarsono (Enhanced Spelling: Trubus Sudarsono, 23 April 1926 – c. 1966) was an Indonesian painter and sculptor. Born to a poor family in Wates, Trubus was interested in the arts from a young age. He learned painting while working as a domestic servant for the artist Sudarso in Batavia (now Jakarta), with further studies under Affandi and S. Sudjojono during the Japanese occupation. In 1947, Trubus joined Pelukis Rakjat, where he produced sculptures, paintings, and propaganda posters under Hendra Gunawan. When the Indonesian Art Academy (now the Indonesia Institute of the Arts Yogyakarta) was established in 1950, Trubus became one of its first teachers.

During the 1950s, Trubus completed several commissions for the Indonesian government, including work on the Selamat Datang Monument and the Bogor Palace. He became more involved in practical politics in the 1960s, joining the Communist Party of Indonesia-affiliated cultural group Lekra and representing the party in the Yogyakarta Provincial Parliament. Trubus was reported killed during the mass killings that followed the failed 30 September Movement in 1965. His work, described as realist and complimented for its figures, has been exhibited in Indonesia and the Netherlands.

== Biography ==
=== Early life and career ===
Trubus was born to a poor family in the town of Wates in Adikarta, Dutch East Indies (now Kulon Progo Regency, Yogyakarta, Indonesia), on 23 April 1926. (Note: Kalim, Yuliastuti & Suyono (2013, p. 60) give 24 April 1926.) Due to the family's poverty, he had limited access to formal education. As a child, he enjoyed wayang (shadow puppets), and would cut characters out of magazines. During special events, such as circumcision ceremonies, he would perform as a dalang (puppeteer). He also took up woodcarving, making masks for jatilan and reog performances.

After some time working in Surakarta colouring photographic enhancements, Trubus travelled to Batavia (now Jakarta) in the late 1930s. He began working for the painter Sudarso as a domestic servant, watching the artist work and studying painting in his free time. He continued his studies during the Japanese occupation of the Dutch East Indies (1942–1945), taking tutelage from the artists Affandi and S. Sudjojono. During the 1930s, these painters had been at the forefront of indigenous artists' efforts to establish an Indonesian painting tradition.

=== Indonesian national revolution ===
Following the outbreak of the Indonesian National Revolution in 1945, Trubus returned to Central Java. While feeding horses in Surakarta in 1946, he was approached by Daoed Joesoef, who had seen him observing painters at work. Joesoef asked Trubus if he was interested in painting, and when Trubus answered in the affirmative, he was invited to work with the Young Artists of Indonesia (Seniman Indonesia Muda, SIM). The group accepted him in a member after seeing his talents.

In 1947, Trubus left SIM to follow with Affandi and Hendra Gunawan when they established the Pelukis Rakjat (lit. 'Painters of the People') in 1947. With this group, Trubus studied sculpture and produced numerous posters critical of the returning Dutch colonial forces; he was arrested when hanging one such poster. He was one of three members who contributed sculptures to the group's inaugural exhibition at the Sonobudoyo Museum in 1947. President Sukarno commissioned a series of portraits of national heroes, with works by Trubus including a portrait of the women's emancipation figure Kartini. In 1948, when Trubus was attempting to leave Indonesia, he was arrested by the Dutch forces. In 1949, the Dutch recognized Indonesian independence, and Trubus settled in Pakem, where he had a view of Mount Merapi from his home.

=== Prominence in Yogyakarta ===
The following year, Trubus was hired by the Indonesian Art Academy (now the Indonesia Institute of the Arts Yogyakarta) in Yogyakarta as one of its first teachers. He remained with the academy through 1964, though not always as a regular lecturer. In a 2013 interview, the Indonesian painter Djoko Pekik described Trubus as a firm and disciplined teacher with nimble hands. At the same time, Trubus continued to work with Pelukis Rakjat, receiving guidance from Hendra. In 1950, he married Samsiah, with whom he had ten children.

Trubus maintained a close relationship with President Sukarno through the 1950s. He helped plan the Selamat Datang Monument in front of Hotel Indonesia in Jakarta, and completed several sculptures for the Presidential Palace in Bogor to replace works remaining from the colonial era. Trubus also completed several works for the Indonesian government, which included a statue of General Oerip Soemohardjo in Magelang and a sculpture of a nursing mother at the Yogyakarta Parliament building. He undertook a tour of Czechoslovakia and the Eastern Bloc in 1954, visiting museums and studios, though he was critical of the situation in articles he wrote upon his return to Indonesia. In 1956, he received a scholarship to study in the United States, though he was refused entry due to an early tour of communist countries.

In the late 1950s, Trubus began to work with a Jakarta-based studio operated by Tio Tek Djien. At the same time, he was courted by the Lembaga Kebudajaan Rakjat ('Institute of People's Culture', Lekra), a cultural body affiliated with the Communist Party of Indonesia (PKI). Offered access to more resources, Trubus joined Lekra and became increasingly involved in politics. In the 1960s, he represented the PKI in the Yogyakarta Provincial Parliament. During this period, he opened his home and studio in Pakem to the public, teaching painting and dance to interested visitors.

=== Death ===
In 1965, a failed coup attempt was undertaken by a group calling itself the 30 September Movement (Gerakan 30 September, or G30S). This attempt was blamed on the PKI, and suspected communists and communist sympathizers were hunted during a multi-year purge. Facing threats of physical violence, Trubus and his family evacuated their home and abandoned his works, then separated, with Samsiah taking the children. She was caught on 10 October 1965 and held without trial, giving birth to the couple's youngest child while interned. Trubus was not captured with Samsiah.

There are no records as to the date and place of Trubus's death, and multiple narratives exist as to his fate. According to Pekik, Trubus led a band of People's Youth and Indonesian Women's Movement members through the forests of Mount Merapi, before being captured by the military and executed in late 1965. Trubus's daughter Sudaryati, meanwhile, states that she met him in Pakem in December 1965, at which time he was in military custody and being sent to Yogyakarta. The sculptor Edhi Sunarso stated that he had sent care packages to Trubus at the Cebongan Prison in Sleman until he vanished. Meanwhile, the writer Nasjah Djamin believed in the 1970s that Trubus was still alive and painting under a pseudonym. Records of Trubus's life generally report him killed in 1966. As of 2013, the Indonesian government has made no official statement.

== Art ==
Stylistically, Trubus was identified as a realist and naturalist who favoured darker colours. He completed numerous landscape paintings, many taking Mount Merapi as their theme. The American art historian Claire Holt writes that some of his best works are his portraits of women. The art curators Mikke Susanto and Rizki Zaelani similarly highlight Trubus's skill in depicting human figures. In sculpture, Trubus worked primarily with stone and metals.

Several of Trubus's works were purchased by President Sukarno. His portrait of Kartini hangs in the Presidential Palace in Yogyakarta. Other works were purchased by government leaders such as Adam Malik and Daoed Joesoef. His Mbah Iro Sentono is held by the National Museum of Indonesia; in 1996, it was one of several paintings stolen from the museum and listed at Christie's before being returned to Indonesia. Trubus's portrait of his mother, completed in 1946, was exhibited at the Rijksmuseum in Amsterdam as part of the exhibition Revolusi! Indonesia Independent in 2022. A centennial exhibition dedicated to Trubus was held in Yogyakarta in 2026.

== Works cited ==
- "All Stolen Paintings Have Been Retrieved". The Jakarta Post. Jakarta. 30 November 1996.
- Diva, Nurul (20 July 2026). "Trubus Soedarsono, Seniman Tanpa Batu Nisan" [Trubus Soedarsono, The Artist Without a Gravestone]. Liputan6 (in Indonesian). Archived from the original on 21 August 2026.
- Holt, Claire (1967). Art in Indonesia: Continuities and Change. Ithaca, New York: Cornell University Press. ISBN 978-0-8014-0188-6.
- Kalim, Nurdin; Yuliastuti, Dian; Suyono, Seno Joko (22 September 2013). "Trubus, di Manakah Anda?" [Trubus, Where Are You?]. Tempo (in Indonesian). Vol. 42, no. 29. p. 60.
- Nugraha, Latief S. (2024). "Seniman Kesayangan Bung Karno yang Lenyap di Tepi Sejarah Kemelut Politik Berdarah 1965" [Bung Karno's Favoured Artist who Vanished Amidst the Bloody Politics of 1965]. In Hardini, Karen; Nugraha, Latief S. (eds.). KRTYA: Profil Pematung Yogyakarta [KRTYA: Profile of Yogyakarta Sculptors] (PDF) (in Indonesian). Yogyakarta: UPT Taman Budaya. pp. 50–63. ISBN 978-623-98370-3-7. Archived from the original (PDF) on 19 June 2026.
- Roosa, John (2006). Pretext for Mass Murder: The September 30th Movement and Suharto's Coup D'état in Indonesia. Madison: University of Wisconsin Press. ISBN 978-0-299-22030-3.
- Susanto, Mikke; Zaelani, Rizki Akhmad (2016). 17/71: Goresan Juang Kemerdekaan: Pameran Koleksi Seni Rupa Istana Kepresidenan Republik Indonesia [17/71: Battlelines of Freedom: An Exhibit of the Artwork of the Presidential Palace of Indonesia] (in Indonesian). Jakarta: Ministry of the Secretariat of the Republic of Indonesia.
- Siregar, Aminudin T.H.; Sidharta, Amir; Stevens, Harm (2022). "Comrades of the Revolution: Artists and the Revolution". Revolusi! : Indonesia independent. Amsterdam: Rijksmuseum. ISBN 978-90-450-4575-7.
