= Pelukis Rakjat =

Indonesian artist collective

Pelukis Rakjat (Enhanced Spelling: Pelukis Rakyat, lit. 'People's Painters') was an Indonesian artist collective (sanggar) active in Yogyakarta from 1947 to 1965. Established by Hendra Gunawan and Affandi after splitting from the Young Artists of Indonesia, the collective sought to promote "Art for the People" and embraced a philosophy of collectivism. Out of their compound, where they lived and worked at times as individuals and at times as groups, they produced numerous paintings and sculptures. Pelukis Rakjat held multiple exhibitions, beginning in 1948, which were the main sites of their art sales. They also received multiple commissions, including sculptures in Jakarta and Yogyakarta as well as the Tugu Muda in Semarang.

Most of Pelukis Rakyat's artists identified as communists, and several were associated with the Communist Party of Indonesia-affiliated Institute of People's Culture. Consequently, members faced death, imprisonment, and exile during the purge of communists that began in 1965.

== History ==
=== Establishment ===
Pelukis Rakjat emerged following a schism in the Young Artists of Indonesia (Seniman Indonesia Muda, SIM), a group established in 1946, over the allocation of government subsidies. SIM's founder, S. Sudjojono, implemented a model similar to that of the Soviet Union, whereby artists received shares determined by their achievements. Meanwhile, the member Hendra Gunawan desired a model that allocated subsidies based on artists' marital status, with married artists receiving a larger share. When this dispute proved irreconcilable, in 1947 Hendra left SIM and co-established the Pelukis Rakjat in Yogyakarta, Indonesia, with fellow artists Affandi and Sudarso, both of whom disagreed with Sudjojono's increasingly photorealistic approach to painting.

Hendra emerged as the group's leader, while Affandi—the more established of the two—focused on developing his individual style. Pelukis Rakjat members began producing works that documented the ongoing Indonesian National Revolution. Influenced in part by the difficulty of accessing supplies, such as zinc white, works tended to have darker colour palettes. Many of these paintings were destroyed by the end of the revolution. To seek popular support for the Indonesian forces, they also mass produced propaganda posters. Pelukis Rakjat held three exhibitions in Yogyakarta by the end of the decade. In 1950, several painters left the group to establish Pelukis Indonesia ('Indonesian Painters').

=== Prominence ===
By the early 1950s, many of Pelukis Rakjat's members were young artists without the means to enter the newly established Indonesian Academy of Art (now the Indonesia Institute of the Arts Yogyakarta). Members came from around the Malay Archipelago, including as far away as Aceh. Communication was primarily in Indonesian, though other languages were used; Affandi and Hendra, both of West Javan origin, spoke Sundanese amongst themselves, while all members picked up elements of the local Javanese language.

Pelukis Rakjat took as its slogan "Art for the People", and embraced a philosophy of communal cooperation. The group held classes for street children and children who had dropped out of school. Public workshops were also held throughout Yogyakarta, including at Sonobudoyo Museum, with the largest sessions having more than a hundred participants.

The communal philosophy was also evident in its living arrangements. Members lived in a communal dormitory (asrama) in Sentulrejo, on the outskirts of Yogyakarta. The Pelukis Rakjat complex consisted of a large main structure and several smaller ones. The front hall of the main building served as a meeting place, as well as a lounge and art gallery. It was lined with numerous paintings, and at times used for bicycle storage. Individual artists and their families had bedrooms, which could be used as studios. Artists could work communally or individually, with regular group trips for in situ painting.

Paintings completed by the Pelukis Rakjat were primarily sold at collective exhibitions. For example, in June 1952 the group held a joint exhibition with SIM and the Jakarta-based Gabungan Pelukis Indonesia ('Indonesian Painters Union') at Taman Siswa that featured 74 paintings. An October 1955 exhibition at Balai Budaya in Jakarta included 44 paintings by 21 members. Several works were acquired by President Sukarno, both in his official and personal capacities.

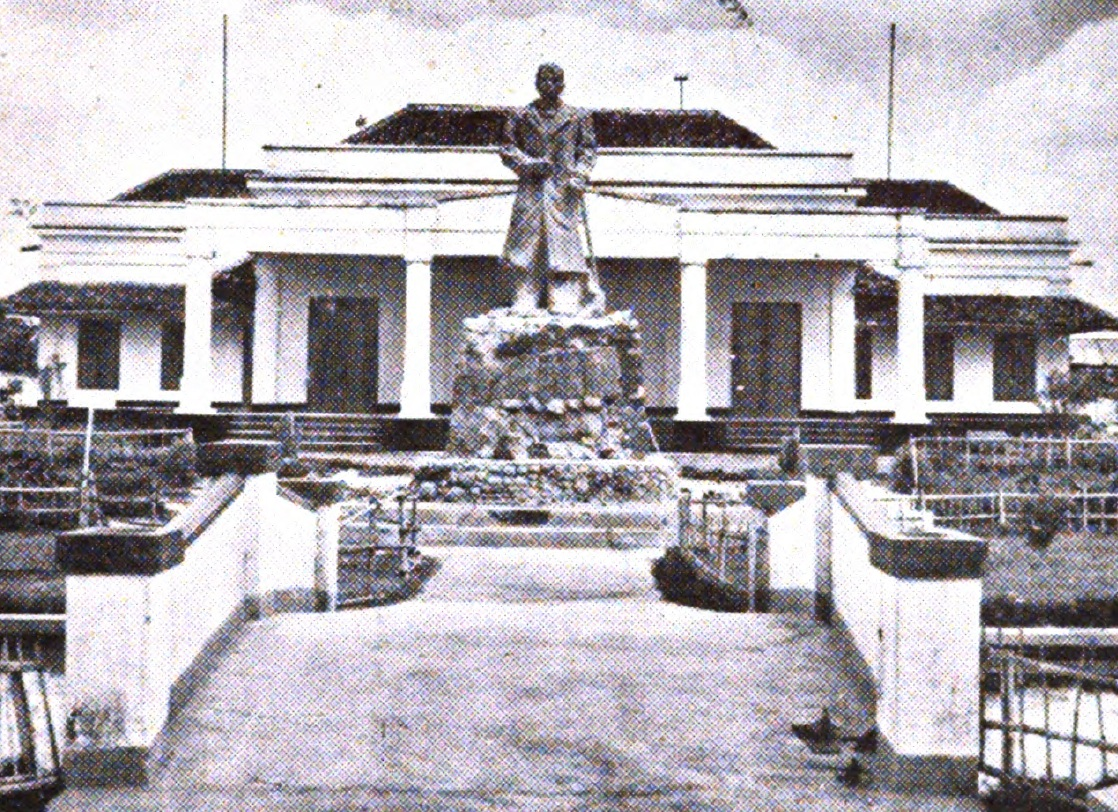
The sculpture of Sudirman by Hendra Gunawan

Sculpture was also part of Pelukis Rakjat's output, with Hendra exhibiting works in clay and stone as early as 1948. He and Affandi sought to teach sculpture to other members. With no professional sculptors available, they hired a stonecutter who made gravestones to teach them to handle chisels and mallets. In the early 1950s, sculptures by the community were completed at the Pelukis Rakjat compound, the yard of which was adorned with worked and unworked stones.

Commissions for sculptures were generally shared amongst the group. The Yogyakarta government commissioned two sculptures from Pelukis Rakjat in the early 1950s, with Hendra completing one of Sudirman and Trubus Sudarsono handling one of Oerip Soemohardjo. In 1954, the group was commissioned by the newly established Airlangga University to complete a 4-metre (13 ft) tall sculpture of its namesake, realized as a manifestation of Vishnu sitting atop Garuda. Commissions in Jakarta included decorations for the Military Police Museum and the headquarters of the Communist Party of Indonesia (PKI), while in Semarang they completed the Tugu Muda.

=== Later years ===
As development of Sentulrejo accelerated, Pelukis Rakjat moved to Mergangsan in 1955. Work on sculptures, meanwhile, was moved to Ngipiksari Hamlet in Sleman, where access to andesite was easier. In 1957, after Hendra was appointed to the Constitutional Assembly of Indonesia and moved to Bandung, he left the leadership position. Sources differ as to his successor; the American art historian Claire Holt writes that this was Sudarso, while Latief S. Nugraha of the Taman Budaya Cultural Centre writes that Abas Alibasyah assumed the leadership role with Sudarso in a supporting role.

Politically, members of Pelukis Rakjat leaned towards communism. Several members were sent to the Eastern Bloc or China to hone their skills, and some were associated with the PKI-affiliated cultural body Lembaga Kebudajaan Rakjat ('Institute of People's Culture', LEKRA). In February 1956, the community held an exhibition in Yogyakarta to raise funds for a PKI-backed housing association. Later, the LEKRA-affiliated Lembaga Seni Drama ('Dramatic Arts Institute') frequently booked the Pelukis Rakjat hall for their performances.

In 1962, the Pelukis Rakjat compound was closed by the government, which intended to use the site to rehabilitate disabled war veterans. Although the twenty members displaced continued to work, the collective did not last beyond 1965. In 1965, following a failed coup attempt by the 30 September Movement, which was blamed on the PKI, the Indonesian government began a multi-year communist purge. Trubus disappeared and is believed to have been killed by the Indonesian military; his remains were never recovered. Several members were taken as political prisoners and held without trial, including Hendra (1965–1978). Others managed to escape imprisonment, with Itji Tarmizi fleeing Java to live in Bukittinggi, West Sumatra.

== Art ==
In a 1954 interview, Hendra described Pelukis Rakjat's mission statement: "We are [the People's Painters]. That means that our art must be understandable to the people. There is no place among us for abstraction and deformation." During the group's 1955 exhibit, the reviewer for the newspaper De Nieuwsgier described Affandi's works as easily the best of the community's, with Hendra's the group's "second pillar". According to the reviewer, the other members had a tendency to care little for the backgrounds of their works.

A common motif in members' works is women travelling to markets, burdened by their loads. Holt describes the subject as providing a "ubiquitous symbol of poverty and degradation". Under Hendra's leadership, the community had a propensity for large works, including a 2.4-by-3.7-metre (8 ft × 12 ft) relief for a workers union building in Madiun and an 2.4-metre (8 ft) tall "portrait head" of Gadjah Mada at the Military Police Museum. According to Hendra, this emphasis on size was a protest against the smallness and "lack of boldness" in contemporary architecture.

== Notable members ==
- Affandi
- Batara Lubis
- Edhi Sunarso
- Gregorius Sidharta
- Hendra Gunawan
- Itji Tarmizi
- Kustiyah
- Trubus Sudarsono

== Works cited ==
- Bodden, Michael (2012). Heirs to World Culture. Leiden: Brill. pp. 453–484. JSTOR 10.1163/j.ctt1w8h2v2.22.
- Daerah Istimewa Jogjakarta [Jogjakarta Special Region] (in Indonesian). Jakarta: Ministry of Information. 1953.
- "Elusive Tarmizi Stages Solo Exhibition". The Jakarta Post. Jakarta. 29 November 2001. p. 1 – via ProQuest.
- Holt, Claire (1967). Art in Indonesia: Continuities and Change. Ithaca, New York: Cornell University Press. ISBN 978-0-8014-0188-6.
- Kalim, Nurdin; Yuliastuti, Dian; Suyono, Seno Joko (22 September 2013). "Trubus, di Manakah Anda?" [Trubus, Where Are You?]. Tempo (in Indonesian). Vol. 42, no. 29. p. 60.
- KP (31 October 1955). "Pelukis Rakjat Verschijnt in Kommune in Djakarta's Balai Budaja" [Pelukis Rakjat Exhibit Communally at Jakarta's Balai Budaja]. De Nieuwsgier. Jakarta. p. 2.
- "Kunst: 'Pelukis Rakjat'" [Arts: 'Pelukis Rakjat']. Java-Bode (in Dutch). Jakarta. 16 February 1957. p. 2.
- "Monument van Koning Erlangga" [Monument to King Erlangga]. Java-Bode (in Dutch). Jakarta. 14 October 1954. p. 2.
- Mooyman, Willem (9 September 1954). "De Volksschilders Wonen aan de Rand van Jogja en Affandi Is Nu bij Hen" [The People's Painters Live Outside Jogja and Affandi Is Now with Them]. De Nieuwsgier (in Dutch). Jakarta. p. 2.
- Nugraha, Latief S. (2024). "Hendra Gunawan: Serba yang Pertama" [Hendra Gunawan: The All-First]. In Hardini, Karen; Nugraha, Latief S. (eds.). KRTYA: Profil Pematung Yogyakarta [KRTYA: Profile of Yogyakarta Sculptors] (PDF) (in Indonesian). Yogyakarta: UPT Taman Budaya. pp. 20–33. ISBN 978-623-98370-3-7. Archived from the original (PDF) on 19 June 2026.
- Rizqita, Akmalia "Chita"; Samboh, Grace; Muffida, Ratna (2023). "Red Frangipani in Cold and Darkness". Hyphen. pp. 8–18.
- Roosa, John (2006). Pretext for Mass Murder: The September 30th Movement and Suharto's Coup D'état in Indonesia. Madison: University of Wisconsin Press. ISBN 978-0-299-22030-3.
- "Tentoonstelling van Taman Siswa School" [Exhibition at Taman Siswa School]. Java-Bode (in Dutch). Jakarta. 26 June 1952. p. 2.
- Vickers, Adrian (2025). "LEKRA, Aesthetics and the Politics of Indonesian Art". Southeast of Now: Directions in Contemporary and Modern Art in Asia. 9: 91–116. doi:10.56159/sen.2025.a960535.
