= Affandi (name) =

Affandi is both a given name and a surname. Notable people with the name include:

- Affandi (1907–1990), Indonesian artist
- Affandi Aboudou (born 2003), Seychellois footballer
- Ahmadullah Affandi (1922–2013), Indian scout
- Kartika Affandi (born 1934), Indonesian artist
- Raja Mohamed Affandi (born 1958), Malaysian military officer
- Yassin Affandi (1922–2012), Bruneian politician

== See also ==
- Affandi Museum, museum in Indonesia
