= Hendra Gunawan (painter) =

Indonesian artist (1918–1983)

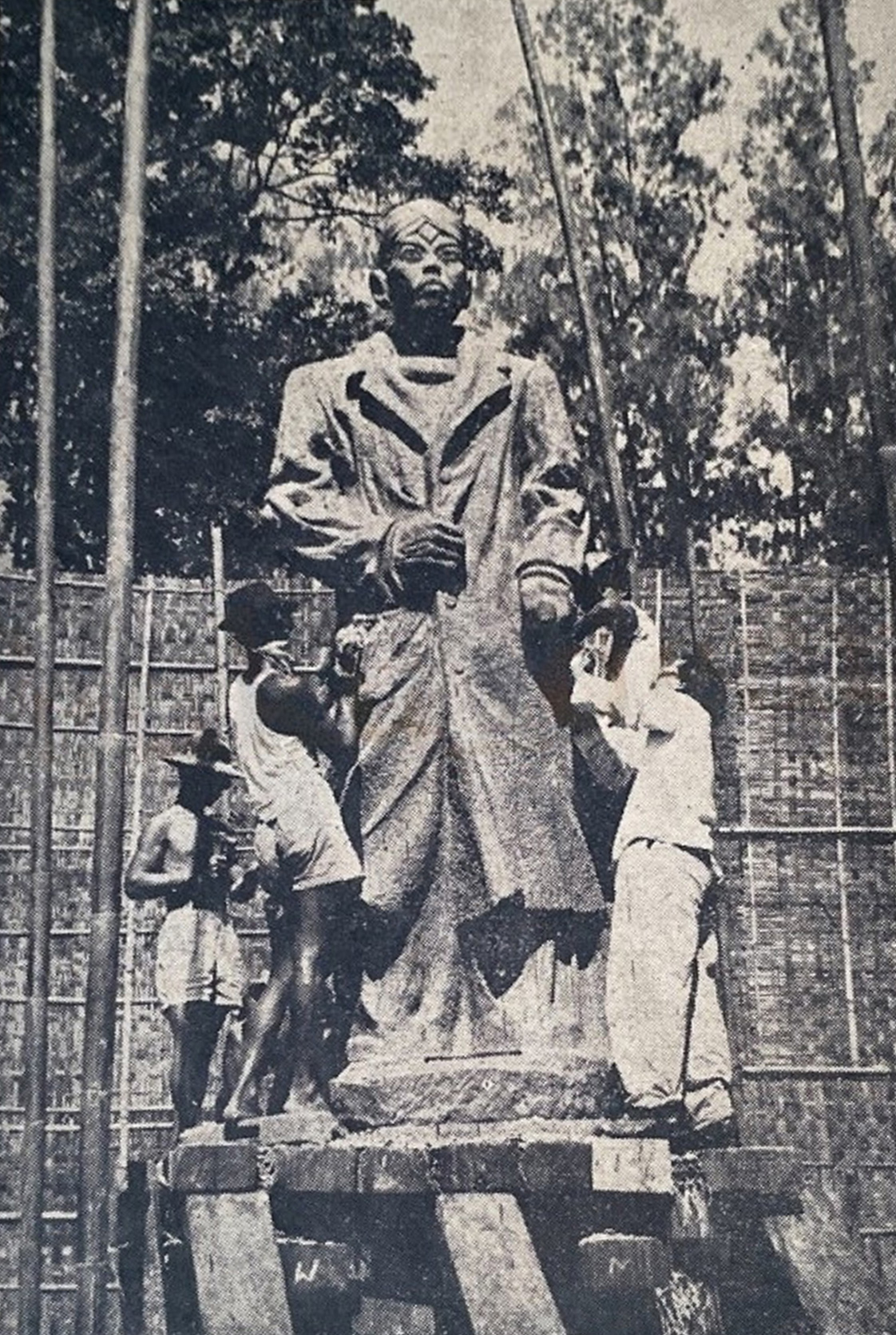
- Hendra (right) working on a sculpture of Sudirman, 1950
- Born: Raden Hendra Gunawan Prawiradilaga; 11 June 1918; Bandung, West Java, Dutch East Indies
- Died: 17 July 1983 (aged 65); Denpasar, Bali, Indonesia
- Style: Expressionism

Raden Hendra Gunawan Prawiradilaga (11 June 1918 – 17 July 1983), better known as Hendra Gunawan, was an Indonesian painter and sculptor. Born to a family of Sundanese gentry in Bandung, he ran away from home to become an artist. After time as a healer and freelance painter, he met Affandi and began to focus on painting. Learning from contemporaries, including Affandi, Wahdi Sumanta, and S. Sudjojono, Hendra honed his art under the Japanese occupation and gained prominence. During the Indonesian National Revolution, he worked with the Pelukis Front (lit. 'Painters of the Front') to capture the realities of the battlefield, which led President Sukarno to sponsor his first solo exhibition in 1946. After a brief membership in the Young Artists of Indonesia, Hendra co-established the Pelukis Rakjat ('Painters of the People') artist collective.

Based in Yogyakarta, Hendra became one of Indonesia's most prominent painters, helped establish the Indonesian Academy of the Arts (now the Indonesia Institute of the Arts Yogyakarta), and taught younger artists to "crystalize their own characters [and] have confidence in their own peculiarities." In 1955, the Communist Party of Indonesia recommended Hendra, a member of the Institute for People's Culture (LEKRA) council, for a non-party position in the Constitutional Assembly of Indonesia. After his appointment, Hendra returned to Bandung, where he remained even after the assembly was dissolved. Following the failed 30 September Movement, which was blamed on the Communist Party, suspected communists were arrested. Due to his affiliation with LEKRA, Hendra was arrested in December 1965, after which he was held for almost thirteen years without trial at the Kebon Waru Prison. Upon his release in 1978, he faced strong stigma and failing health. He moved to Bali, where he died in 1983.

Hendra is considered one of the founders of modern Indonesian art, alongside Affandi and Sudjojono. His style varied over time, initially stressing realism but becoming increasingly impressionist, with bright, unnatural colours, and an emphasis on curves noted in later works. Most of his paintings depict human figures, with women particularly prominent after the 1960s. Some have poems inscribed by the artist. On the art market, works by Hendra sell for a high price, such that forgeries have become common.

== Biography ==
=== Early life and career ===
Hendra was born in Bandung, West Java, Dutch East Indies (now Indonesia) on 11 June 1918, to Raden Prawiranegara and Raden Odah Tejaningsih, who were descended from the Sundanese gentry. After his parents' divorce, Hendra was raised by his father, a railroad employee with gambling and alcoholism issues. He completed studies at the Kadmirah Elementary School in Bandung and a Dutch-run school for indigenous Indonesians in Purwakarta, graduating in 1931. Hendra and his father were reported to have argued frequently over his interest in the performance and visual arts, as he was expected to follow his father's footsteps and work the railroads.

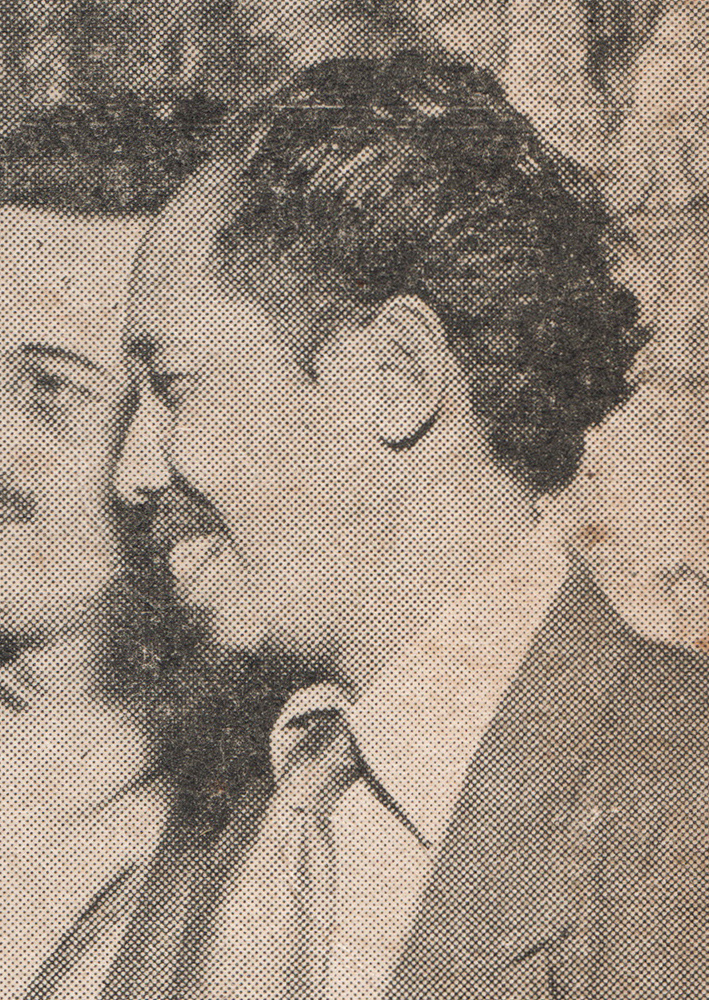
Affandi (pictured in 1953), who inspired Hendra to focus on art

After one such fight, Hendra ran away from home and began wandering West Java. At first gaining a reputation as a healer, in 1937 Hendra joined a theatrical company. For them, he began painting backdrops, also taking jobs painting posters announcing new film releases. During this period, Hendra studied modern art from a porcelain industrialist identified as Giorgi Giseken. In 1939, Hendra met Affandi, who inspired him to focus more on his art, and he began to experiment with painting and sketching. Initially, Hendra sought to hone his art by apprenticing to the naturalist painter Abdullah Suriosubroto. Ultimately, he decided to learn from his contemporaries, taking lessons in landscapes from Wahdi Sumanta and forms from Affandi and becoming part of their Group of Five. From the painter S. Sudjojono, he learned about the history of art. In 1940, Hendra married Karmini, with whom he had three children.

Over time, Hendra became more prominent in the Indonesian art world, in part through the backing of the scholar Sjafei Soemardja. He established friendships with several artists, including Popo Iskandar and Sudjana Kerton, and visited the workshop of Indonesian Painters Association. In 1940, he helped establish the art club Pusaka Sunda (lit. 'Sundanese Heirlooms') and organized a reog troupe. After the Japanese occupation of the Dutch East Indies in 1942, Hendra joined the Institute for People's Education and Cultural Guidance (Poesat Keboedajaan) that had been established by the occupation government. While living in Bandung, he travelled to Jakarta on several occasions to attend the head offices of the Institute. He participated in multiple exhibitions, receiving an award from the Institute after one such exhibition. Several of his paintings from this period bore Japanese influences. Hendra was also a member of Center of the People's Power, another organization established by the occupation regime.

After Indonesia proclaimed its independence and the national revolution began in 1945, Hendra took up arms while simultaneously painting. As part of the Pelukis Front ('Painters of the Front'), Hendra worked with artists such as Barli, Abedy, Sudjana Kerton, and Turkandi, to capture the physical conflict. Together, they held several exhibitions in Tasikmalaya and Yogyakarta. Hendra also produced posters that promoted Indonesian independence and revolution.

Around 1946, Hendra moved to Yogyakarta. He held his first solo exhibition in 1946 at the National Committee of Indonesia Building on Malioboro Street. This event was sponsored by President Sukarno, who also attended the exhibition, based on the revolutionary themes in Hendra's works. Despite existing protocols, it was also attended by numerous beggars. Speaking with a tearful Sukarno, Hendra was reported to have said, "Every person has the right to enjoy my paintings." (Note: Original: "Setiap orang berhak menikmati lukisan saya.")

=== Pelukis Rakjat and political activities ===
Hendra briefly joined the Young Artists of Indonesia (Seniman Indonesia Muda, SIM), but 1947 he split with the organization and established the Pelukis Rakjat ('Painters of the People') with Affandi and Sudarso. This split was in part due to a dispute between Hendra and SIM's founder, Sudjojono, over the allocation of government subsidies. Sudjojono promoted a model similar to that of the Soviet Union, with artists receiving shares determined by their achievements, while Hendra argued for a model wherein subsidies were allocated based on artists' marital status, with married artists receiving a larger share. At the same time, Hendra disagreed with Sudjojono's increasingly photorealistic approach to painting, which he was teaching his followers.

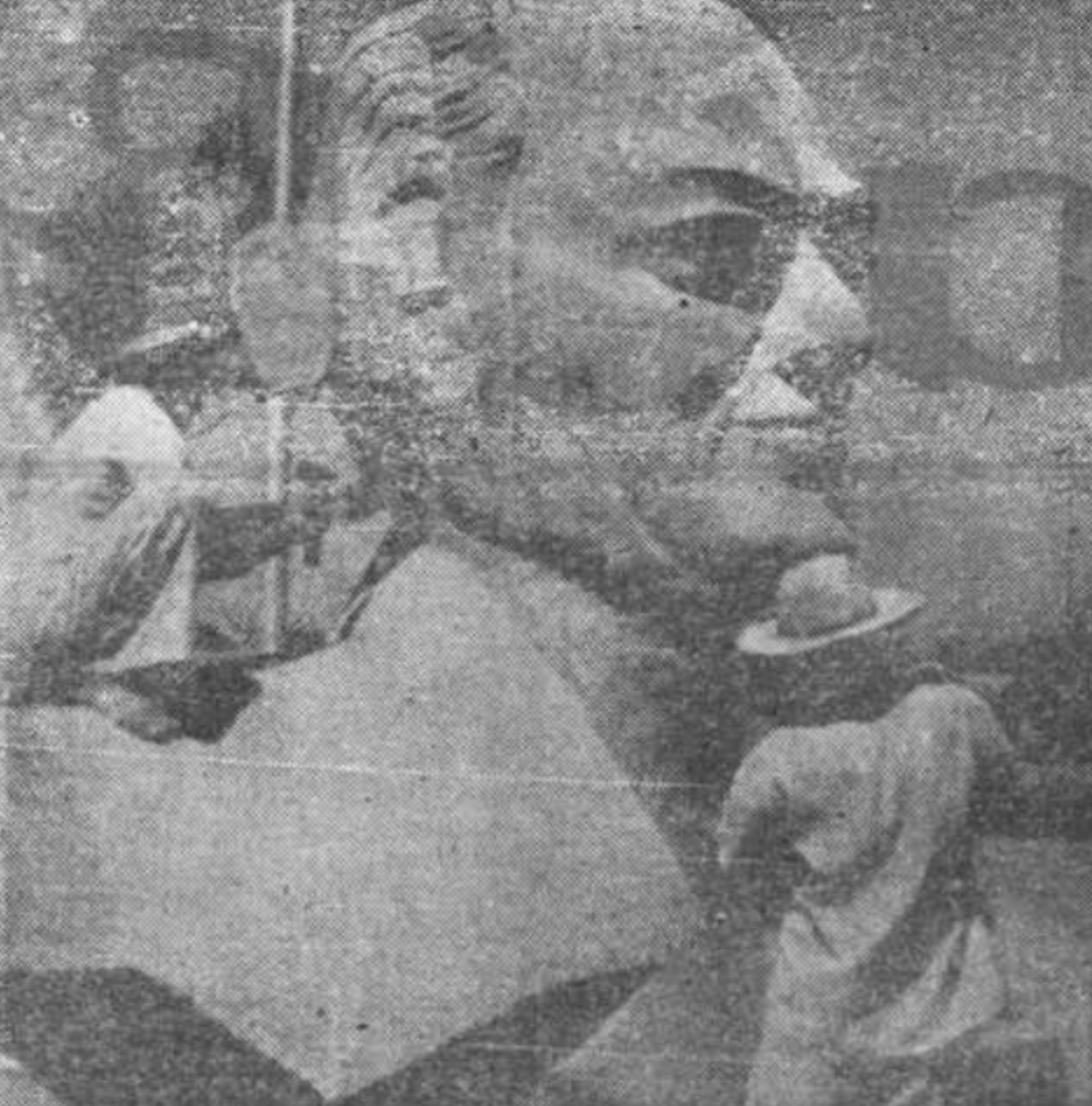
Hendra (lower right) working on a sculpture of Sam Ratulangi, 1957

As the leader of Pelukis Rakjat, Hendra and his family lived in a communal dormitory, with their bedroom also serving as his studio. Members of the artist community collaborated on sculptures, with Hendra seeking a gravecutter to teach them to use the chisel and mallet. Hendra received a commission in 1950 to install a 3-metre (9.8 ft) tall sculpture of General Sudirman. Completed in andesite, it was installed in front of the Yogyakarta Provincial Parliament. Hendra also completed the Tugu Muda in Semarang in conjunction with several of his students, including Edhi Sunarso.

Paintings, meanwhile, were generally handled by individuals, though Hendra taught more junior members of the community; in this, he stressed the importance of folk arts such as kuda kepang (a form of trance dance) and ketoprak (a stage performance) and urged members to "crystalize their own characters [and] have confidence in their own peculiarities." Works were exhibited in a shared gallery, as well as joint exhibitions, which also provided venues for the sale of paintings to collectors. Hendra reserved the right to block a sale, refusing to allow works by Itji Tarmizi and Trubus Sudarsono to be sold until the artists produced works that improved on them. By the mid-1950s, Hendra was one of Indonesia's most prominent artists.

Outside of Pelukis Rakjat, Hendra helped establish the Indonesian Academy of the Arts (now the Indonesia Institute of the Arts Yogyakarta), and he remained a visiting lecturer for several years. In 1951, Hendra was part of a delegation to the Youth Festival held in East Berlin, East Germany. During this trip, he made stops in Italy, Romania, the Soviet Union, and China. He was sent to the Soviet Union again in 1954 as part of an arts study program. During this period, Hendra established personal relationships with national leaders, including Sukarno and statesmen such as Adam Malik and Chaerul Saleh. Hendra joined the Lembaga Kebudajaan Rakjat ('Institute for People's Culture', LEKRA) in the early 1950s.

In 1955, Hendra—by then a member of LEKRA's central committee—was nominated by the Communist Party of Indonesia (PKI) for a non-party position in the Constitutional Assembly of Indonesia. After his appointment, in 1957 he moved to Bandung, where he built a house and raised chickens. His position as leader of the Pelukis Rakjat was assumed by Sudarso. At the same time, Hendra continued to produce art. He submitted two designs for the National Monument, though neither was chosen. He also helped LEKRA establish the University of People's Art in Bandung. For two years, between 1963 and 1965, Hendra lived in Cirebon, where he was married to a woman named Ijah and lived on the slopes of Mount Ciremai; from this vantage, he painted several seascapes.

=== Internment and later life ===
In September 1965, a coup was undertaken by a group identifying itself as the 30 September Movement (Gerakan 30 September, or G30S). In the aftermath, President Sukarno was replaced by General Suharto as President of Indonesia. Suharto blamed the coup on the PKI, and the years that followed were marked by a tumultuous transition in which hundreds of thousands were killed. As a LEKRA leader, and thus suspected communist, Hendra was arrested in December 1965 at Ciparay in Bandung. Hendra was held without trial for almost thirteen years, being detained at Kebon Waru Prison. During this period he continued to paint; according to his family, he had access to canvas through the stationery shop owner Rudi Hap Ciang and the prison psychiatrist Lukas Mangindaan. Hendra also took a second wife, marrying fellow LEKRA member Nuraeni; the two had met in 1963 at an organizational function.

Hendra was released on 15 May 1978. He initially stayed Jakarta, at times trading paintings for money and food, living in poverty and with failing health. He participated in a joint exhibition with Affandi and other artists from his West Javan period in 1978, which was part of a collective effort to restore his reputation. The following year, Hendra exhibited 21 works at Taman Ismail Marzuki, though potential buyers were limited due to the stigma of Hendra's detention. In 1980, he relocated to Bali, where he held an exhibition of 27 works in 1982. That year, he also donated two large works to the Balinese government, one depicting a conflict between Prince Kornel and Governor-General Herman Willem Daendels and the other inspired by the Buleleng War.

After experiencing a heart attack, as well as complications that included diarrhea and ulcers, Hendra was admitted to Sanglah Hospital in Denpasar in 1983. He died on 17 July, after which his body was transported to Bandung, where it was interred. Several of Indonesia's most prominent artists reminisced on him in newspaper Kompas, highlighting Hendra's dedication, teaching abilities, dedication to the nation, and "infatuation with the people". He was survived by his wives and four children: Karmini and their three children, as well as Nuraeni and their son.

== Art ==
Twelve Years Without a Bath (self-portrait, 1977, Ciputra Artpreneur); works by Hendra completed after his imprisonment are characterized by bright colours and strong curves, with distorted forms

In a 1955 interview with the American art historian Claire Holt, Hendra described himself as motivated by "compassion for the poor and downtrodden", inspired by the kindness he received as a homeless youth. The art historian Astri Wright writes that, as with his contemporary Sudjojono, Hendra emphasized that "the artist's main role [should] be the pursuit of the truth." In this, she describes him as "a man of strong feeling who tended to act out his emotions", who showed his greatest intensity in the works completed during his internment.

Hendra's works generally focused on compositions of figures, and included people "at work and play, in celebration, struggle, and death". Paintings depict burdened women travelling the roads of Central Java, subjects inspired by wayang (shadow puppetry), Balinese culture, and scenes from history. Women are common subjects in his works, particularly after his imprisonment. They are depicted in the midst of various activities, from grooming to guerrilla warfare. Many of his human subjects are depicted in profile or silhouette. Several paintings of groups include Hendra—often wearing sunglasses—as a subject, and a few self-portraits are attested. Landscapes are rare in Hendra's oeuvre.

Writing for the Fukuoka Asian Art Museum, the Japanese curator Kuroda Raiji described Hendra's style as "highly distinctive and instantly identifiable". Kuroda describes Hendra's brushwork as flowing and ferocious, "reminiscent of watercolor techniques", while Wright notes strong expressionist tendencies. Discussing one of Hendra's self-portraits, she identifies thin washes of red walls and grey floors paired with impasto on the human subject, which she considers illustrative of the artist's typical treatment of paint. In their composition, Hendra's paintings often consist of curves and "S"-shapes, repeated, interlocking, and contrasting.

Hendra's early works, completed in the 1940s, draw more heavily from realism, and the propaganda works of the 1940s have dark colours and titles like Attack, Hunger, and Bomb Crater. In the 1950s, Hendra put greater emphasis on his "stylistic individuality", which became less restrained over time. Generally, Hendra's works are marked by unnatural skin tones—greens, blues, and pinks—and colours as well as heavily distorted forms; works from the 1940s already included exaggerated facial features and arms that Wright links to traditional wayang puppets. During his internment in the 1960s, Hendra was inspired by Nuraeni's use of bright colours during her lessons and began using brighter colours himself.

Several of Hendra's works are inscribed with poems written by the artist. A work titled Pangeran Kornel, depicting a meeting between Kornel and Daendels amidst the corpses of people killed building the Great Post Road, bears an inscription translated as "beneath the raging whip/the planks of bridges are people/the leaves of trees human beings".

== Legacy ==
Hendra has been considered one of Indonesia's greatest artists, an assessment that Wright found shared by "people with a radical world-view" and "people comfortable with the status quo". In her exploration of Indonesian art, Holt described Hendra as "one of the best and most versatile painters of Indonesia", considered in conjunction with Affandi and Sudjojono to be the fathers of modern art in the country. The Indonesian art critic Agus Dermawan T. attributed Hendra's exemplariness to his "portraying Indonesian populist feelings in all aspects."

During his lifetime, Hendra received numerous commissions from the Indonesian government. Several of Hendra's paintings were purchased by President Sukarno. Private owners have included the businessmen Jusuf Wanandi and Ciputra. On the market, paintings by Hendra have sold for billions of rupiah, appreciating from an average of S$30–50,000 in 1996 to S$230,000 in 2002. At Sotheby's Hong Kong, one painting sold for HK$33.2 million (US$4.2 million) in 2016. Due to the demand and prices fetched by Hendra's paintings, forgery is rampant, and has been a problem since the 1980s.

Through the 1990s, writings on Hendra were limited due to the political sensitivity. In 2013, a book commemorating Hendra titled Hendra Gunawan: Sang Pelukis Rakyat (Hendra Gunawan: The People's Painter) was published by the art collector Agung Tobing. It included 239 reproductions of paintings identified as Hendra's, mostly completed in Kebon Waru, but faced criticism for potentially containing forgeries. In 2015, President Joko Widodo posthumously awarded Hendra a Bintang Budaya Parama Dharma for his contributions to Indonesian culture. Ciputra Artpreneur hosted an exhibition of more than 30 Hendra Works in 2018 to commemorate the artist's centennial. Titled "Hendra Gunawan: Prisoner of Hope", it ran alongside a companion exhibition containing works inspired by and responding to Hendra's art. The centennial was also commemorated with a book by Agus Dermanwan T., titled Surga Kemelut Pelukis Hendra: Dari Pengantin Revolusi Sampai Terali Besi (The Complicated Heaven of the Painter Hendra: From Revolutionary Wedding to Iron Bars) and published by Kepustakaan Populer Gramedia.

== Works cited ==
- Ciputra Artpreneur (2017). "Hendra Gunawan and Us Seeing Indonesia". Google Arts and Culture. Google. Archived from the original on 27 July 2026.
- Dermawan T., Agus (20 June 2018). "Hendra Gunawan's Centenary, a Painter's Great Fortitude". The Jakarta Post. Archived from the original on 27 July 2026.
- "Hendra, Dari Revolusi ke Bali" [Hendra, From Revolution to Bali]. Tempo (in Indonesian). Vol. 13. 23 July 1983. p. 18.
- Kuroda, Raiji. "Hendra Gunawan: Tropical Ferocity Born of Turbulent History". Asian Art Resource Room. Translated by Stephens, Christopher. Fukuoka Asian Art Museum. Archived from the original on 27 July 2026.
- Holt, Claire (1967). Art in Indonesia: Continuities and Change. Ithaca, New York: Cornell University Press. ISBN 978-0-8014-0188-6.
- Ngui, Clarence Y. K. (12 December 2002). "For Art's Sake". Malaysian Business. p. 30 – via ProQuest.
- Nugraha, Latief S. (2024). "Hendra Gunawan: Serba yang Pertama" [Hendra Gunawan: The All-First]. In Hardini, Karen; Nugraha, Latief S. (eds.). KRTYA: Profil Pematung Yogyakarta [KRTYA: Profile of Yogyakarta Sculptors] (PDF) (in Indonesian). Yogyakarta: UPT Taman Budaya. pp. 20–33. ISBN 978-623-98370-3-7. Archived from the original (PDF) on 19 June 2026.
- Roosa, John (2006). Pretext for Mass Murder: The September 30th Movement and Suharto's Coup D'état in Indonesia. Madison: University of Wisconsin Press. ISBN 978-0-299-22030-3.
- Ricklefs, M. C. (1993). A History of Modern Indonesia since c.1300 (2nd ed.). Hampshire: Macmillan. ISBN 978-0-333-57689-2.
- Suyono, Seno Joko; Yuliastuti, Dian; Siswadi, Anwar; Maharani, Shinta (4 August 2015). "Nuraeni and the Legacy of Hendra Gunawan". Tempo. Archived from the original on 27 July 2026.
- Wright, Astri (1994). Soul, Spirit, and Mountain: Preoccupations of Contemporary Indonesian Painters. Kuala Lumpur: Oxford University Press. ISBN 978-967-65-3042-4.
- Yuliastuti, Dian (20 July 2018). "Museum Ciputra Helat Pameran Seni Rupa Seabad Hendra Gunawan" [Ciputra Museum Holds Visual Arts Exhibition for Hendra Gunawan's Centennial]. Tempo (in Indonesian). Archived from the original on 27 July 2026.
