= List of Muslim painters =

This is a subarticle to Muslim, artists and Islamic art.

A Muslim painter is a Muslim that is or was engaged in painting or drawing. This is an incomplete list of notable Muslim painters.

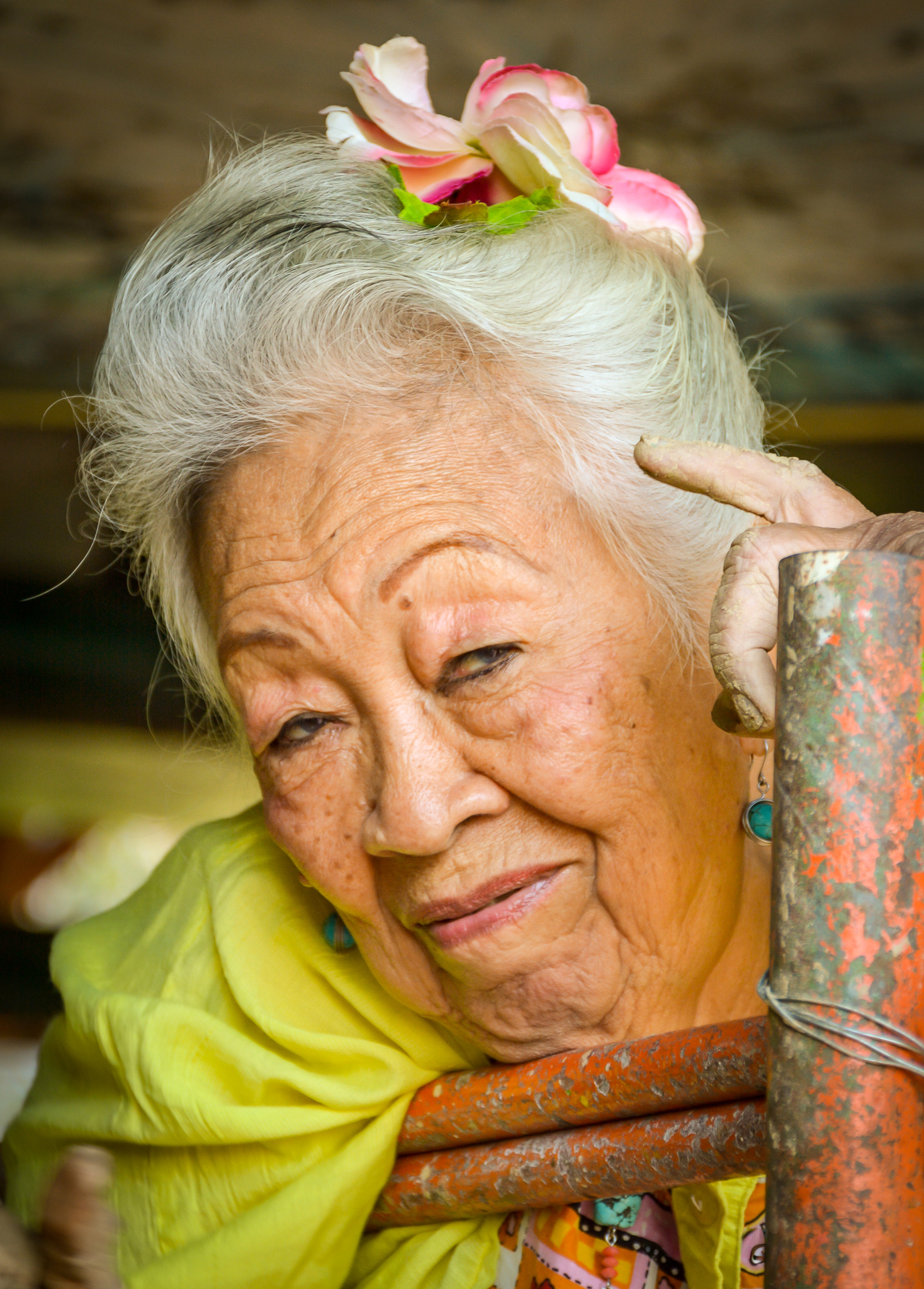
Kartika Affandi

- Abed Abdi (born 1942), Palestinian painter
- Zainul Abedin (1914–1976), Bangladeshi painter
- Affandi (1907–1990), Indonesian painter
- İsmail Acar (born 1971), Turkish painter
- Lubna Agha (1942–2012), Pakistan-born American painter
- Shakir Ali (1916–1975), Pakistani painter and lecturer
- Abdur Rahman Chughtai (1894–1975), Pakistani painter and intellectual
- Ismail Gulgee (1926–2007), Pakistani painter
- M. F. Husain (1915–2011), Indian painter
- Kartika Affandi (born 1934), Indonesian painter, daughter of Affandi
- Hédi Khayachi (1882–1948), Tunisian painter
- Tyeb Mehta (1925–2009), Indian painter
- Mochtar Apin (1932–1994), Indonesian painter and lecturer
- Sughra Rababi (1922–1994), Pakistani painter
- Sadequain (1923–1987), Pakistani painter and poet
- SM Sultan (1923–1994), Bengali painter
- Umi Dachlan (1942–2009), Indonesian painter and lecturer
- Shafique Farooqi (1942), Painter

== See also ==
- Lists of Muslims
- Lists of painters
