= Kuslan Budiman =

Indonesian poet and writer (1935–2018)

- Born: 6 April 1935; Trenggalek, East Java, Dutch East Indies
- Died: 6 December 2018 (aged 83); Naarden, Netherlands
- Writing career
- Language: Indonesian
- Genre: Poetry

Kuslan Budiman (6 April 1935 – 6 December 2018) was an Indonesian poet, fiction writer and artist. After his graduation from art school in Yogyakarta, he went to China to study Mandarin and Chinese dramatic traditions. In 1971, Kuslan moved to Moscow to study Russian. He died on 6 December 2018 aged 83 from pancreatic cancer.

In 1961, in Yogyakarta, Kuslan and Amrus Natalsya, Misbach Tamrin, Ng Sembiring, Isa Hasanda, Hardjija Pudjanadi, Harmani, Haryanto, etc. founded Bumi Tarung (SBT) (Battleground Studio), a visual art collective. SBT members were considered "leftists" because of their affiliation with the Indonesian Artists Association (Lembaga Senirupa Indonesia), an art body supported by the People's Cultural Association (Lembaga Kebudayaan Rakyat: LEKRA), the cultural arm of the Indonesian Communist Party (Partai Komunis Indonesia: PKI).

As other Lekra members in 1950s and 1960s, Kulan also participated in the TURBA program. TURBA is an acronym for 'turun ke bawah', meaning 'descend from above'. Part of the goals of the program was to transform urbanised leftists by introducing them to village life to experience the physical deprivations and psychological hardships. Kuslan and fellow Lekra artist Mawie Ananta Yonie later recollected that the class differences between people of the urban and rural village were magnified on the physical level. For example, it was difficult for these young urban youths to see village farmers to defecate unsanitarily in the river, or watching the ritual of prostitution called tayuban for "boys become men". At the same time, many Lekra members were tired of the labor after a few days. Kuslan recalled that 'Our bodies were not suited to that kind of work,...our muscles were not developed, our hands were not properly callused.' In retrospect, it is hard to conclude if the TURBA program was a success or whether the program achieved all primary goals; however, Lekra members' village experiences forced them to confront their class-based prejudices in a transformative way.

After Suharto's rise to power in 1965, as a result of his New Order regime's effort to purge communism, members of SBT became a clear target and were eventually arrested, imprisoned without trial, killed, disappeared, or in the case of Kuslan, his original brief stay in China for study became unintended exile. During Kuslan's exile, he and his comrades kept the Indonesian students and exiles in touch with each other and encouraged them to express their concerns about Indonesia.

Kuslan's published writings can be found in Indonesian's exile journals. However, with the help of the internet, Kuslan's work has since been disseminated digitally as well.

== Publications ==
=== Poetry ===
- Rindu Bunganya Cinta: Empat Kumpulan Sajak, 1977.
- Senja di kota tua: tiga kumpulan sajak, 1978.
- Komune: sebuah sketsa, 1978.
- Bekas tanpa akhir. Moscow, 1986 (rotaprint edition)
- Kabar sakaparan: kumpulan geguritan, 1991 (in Javanese).
- Tanah kelahiran: kumpulan sajak. Amsterdam: Stichting Budaya, 1994 (Kreasi No.20) (first rotaprint edition, Moscow, 1986).
- Stories From Exile, Menagerie 6: Indonesian in Exile, Jakarta: Lontar Foundation, 2004
- Di Negeri Orang: Puisi Penyair Indonesia Eksil, Jakarta: Lontar Foundation, Amanah, 2002

=== Fiction ===
- Bendera Itu Masih Berkibar, Jakarta: Suara Bebas, 2005
- Si Didi anak petani, Djakarta: Jajasan Kebudajaan Sadar, 1964
