= Zaini =

Zaini may refer to:

- Zaini (given name), Japanese given name
- Zaini (surname), Japanese surname

== Middle name ==
- Ahmad Zaini Japar (1956–2023), Malaysian politician
- Nor Saiful Zaini Nasir-ud-Din (born 1966), Malaysian field hockey player
