= Itji Tarmizi =

Indonesian painter (1939–2001)

- A self-portrait of Itji, 1955
- Born: 1939; Batusangkar, West Sumatra, Dutch East Indies
- Died: 27 November 2001 (aged 61–62); Jakarta, Indonesia

Itji Tarmizi (1939 – 28 November 2001) was an Indonesian painter. Born in West Sumatra, he lived in Java as a teenager. While in Yogyakarta, he joined the artist collectives Pelukis Rakjat and Bumi Tarung, with whom he completed numerous works of socialist realism. In 1965, after a failed coup resulted in the widespread killing and detention of suspected communists, he fled to Sumatra and found shelter with his grandmother. Believed dead by his contemporaries, he was rediscovered in 2000 and held his only solo exhibition in Jakarta in 2001. He died before the exhibition was finished.

Itji's art is poorly documented, and many of his artworks have disappeared. Works by Itji are held by several museums, including the State Museum of Oriental Art in Moscow, the National Gallery Singapore, and the Museum of Fine Arts and Ceramics in Jakarta.

== Biography ==
Itji was born in Batusangkar, West Sumatra, Dutch East Indies, in 1939. He lost his hearing as a child after a severe illness. He travelled to Java and was living in Yogyakarta as a teenager.

In the mid-1950s, Itji was involved with the Pelukis Rakjat (lit. 'People's Painters'), an artist collective led by Hendra Gunawan. One of the community's youngest members, he was coached by Hendra to strive towards improving his work; when he produced a painting of resting cattle that Hendra deemed his best to date, he was not allowed to sell it until he had created a better work. Itji was one of several Pelukis Rakjat painters who exhibited in Jakarta in 1955.

Later, Itji joined the artist collective Bumi Tarung ('Battle Ground'). This collective, which was associated with the leftist Institute for People's Culture (Lekra), was known for works of socialist realism that explicitly illustrated class antagonism. He completed several portraits that depicted leaders of the Communist Party of Indonesia (PKI) working rice fields with peasants. Itji travelled internationally several times, including to the Soviet Union and China. This included one trip in 1964, during which the Indonesian government sponsored him to receive medical treatment for his hearing in Beijing.

In 1965, following a failed coup attempt by the 30 September Movement, which was blamed on the PKI, the Indonesian government began a multi-year communist purge. Communist-associated cultural groups, including Lekra, were disbanded. Itji fled Java for West Sumatra, where he lived in anonymity, protected by his grandmother. By the 1970s, his former colleagues, most of whom had been arrested and held without trial, feared that he had died.

A painting by Itji was sold by the Larasati Auction House in 2000, and as a result the Indonesian art community realized that he was still active. To help rehabilitate Itji's reputation, several of Itji's friends helped him organize his first solo exhibition in Jakarta in 2001. The exhibition, which began on 23 November, included numerous sketches and paintings by Itji, including a series of self-portraits completed between the 1950s and 1990s. He died of liver cancer on 28 November, before the end of the exhibition. He was buried at Pondok Kelapa Cemetery in East Jakarta.

== Art ==
Stylistically, Itji's work is classified as socialist realism, with a use of light that presents a sense of radiance. According to the Indonesianist Adrian Vickers, Itji's works were closest to the ideal among his contemporaries. Reviewing his painting Menyongsong Fajar ('Watching the Sunrise') for the National Gallery Singapore, Gerald Sim describes it as a valuable record of the working classes and their social conditions in 1950s Indonesia, with a sense of tenseness and seriousness that reflects the anxieties of the times. Vickers, examining a painting with the same theme held by the Oei Hong Djien Museum, describes it as "classically socialist realist" with its emphasis on "heroic fisherwomen". Reviewing Itji's works for Tempo magazine, Seno Joko Suyono described them as having an undercurrent of optimism.

Itji's art has been poorly documented, and many recorded works have vanished; this includes portraits of PKI leaders such as D. N. Aidit. His painting Menyongsong Fajar is held by the National Gallery Singapore. Another painting, Lelang Ikan ('Fish Auction'), was acquired by President Sukarno; Adam Malik also acquired works by Itji. Itji's Kerja Paksa ('Forced Labour') was acquired by the Museum of Fine Arts and Ceramics in Jakarta. His painting The New City of Sukarnopura (1963) was acquired by the State Museum of Oriental Art in Moscow, Soviet Union (now Russia). One of Itji's works, depicting a group of labourers smoking and distributing packages of rice, was shown during the 2006 Jakarta Biennale.

== Works cited ==
- Burhan, M. Agus (2013). Seni Lukis Indonesia Masa Jepang Sampai Lekra [Indonesian Painting from the Japanese Period through Lekra]. Surakarta: UNS Press. ISBN 978-979-498-834-3.
- Holt, Claire (1967). Art in Indonesia: Continuities and Change. Ithaca, New York: Cornell University Press. ISBN 978-0-8014-0188-6.
- "Remembering Itji Tarmizi, An Enigmatic Painter". The Jakarta Post. 4 December 2001. p. 1. ProQuest 288155782.
- Oei, Hong Djien (2012). Art and Collecting Art. Jakarta: Kepustakaan Populer Gramedia. ISBN 978-602-424-447-7.
- Roosa, John (2006). Pretext for Mass Murder: The September 30th Movement and Suharto's Coup D'état in Indonesia. Madison: University of Wisconsin Press. ISBN 978-0-299-22030-3.
- Sim, Gerald (4 September 2020). "Itji Tarmizi: The Missing Link". National Gallery Singapore. Archived from the original on 21 September 2026.
- Suyono, Seno Joko (9 December 2001). "Potret Diri Sang Pelukis Rakyat" [Self-Portrait of the People's Painter]. Tempo (in Indonesian). Vol. 30, no. 41. p. 125.
- Suyono, Seno Joko (29 May 2006). "The Show Must Go On..." Tempo (in Indonesian). Vol. 35, no. 14. p. 48.
- Vickers, Adrian (2025). "LEKRA, Aesthetics and the Politics of Indonesian Art". Southeast of Now: Directions in Contemporary and Modern Art in Asia. 9: 91–116. doi:10.56159/sen.2025.a960535.
