= Amrus Natalsya =

Indonesian painter and wood sculpture artist (1933–2024)

- Born: Amrus Natalsya; 21 October 1933; Natal, Tapanoeli Residency, Dutch East Indies
- Died: 31 January 2024 (aged 90); Bogor, West Java, Indonesia
- Education: Fine Arts of Indonesia in Yogyakarta (1954)
- Notable work: "A Forgotten Blind" (1955), “Unheard Cries” (1955), "My friends" (1959), "Noah's Ark" (1998), "China Town" (1999)
- Movement: Bumi Tarung

Amrus Natalsya (21 October 1933 – 31 January 2024) was an Indonesian poet, painter and wood sculptor artist. He was a political prisoner of the Suharto regime; arrested during the Transition to the New Order in 1965 for his ties to the Communist Party, he was held in prison without charge until 1973.

== Life and creativity ==
Amrus was born in Natal, North Sumatra. His given name was Amrus, but when he went to school in Yogyakarta, he added Natalsya to the last name, taken from his hometown name "Natal" and his grandfather's name "Syah Alam", a prosecutor who was good at playing the violin. Amrus completed his elementary school in Natal, and continued high school in Medan.

After graduating from high school, he entered the Academy of Fine Arts of Indonesia in Yogyakarta in 1954. At the student exhibition at the Museum of Javanese Culture "Sono Budoyo" his wooden sculpture "A Forgotten Blind" was purchased by the president Sukarno. In the same year in Bandung, he participated in an exhibition timed to the Bandung Conference of Asia and Africa, where he exhibited his new wooden work “Unheard Cries”, which was praised by critics; the American art critic Claire Holt wrote:

... How amazing the artist presented the suffering and the struggle of the spirit at this exhibition. Amrus is the most original young sculptor with such quality works that you rarely see in other Indonesian artists. -

In 1957, he held his first solo exhibition in Jakarta, the first exhibition under the open sky in Indonesia. He presented his wooden sculptures up to four meters high. In 1959, Batara Lubis, the cartoonist A. Sibarani and he represented Indonesia at the International Youth Week in Vienna, and on the way back they visited the Soviet Union and China. The following year he went to Jidda at the invitation of the mayor of the city to make a wooden panel with calligraphy. At the same time he performed Hajj.

In 1960, at a student exhibition in Yogyakarta, he exhibited paintings on canvas, and again they attracted Sukarno’s attention: he bought the canvas "My friends" (1959). In 1961, together with other students (Misbach Tamrin, Kuslan Budiman, Adrianus Gumelar, and others) he created the Bumi Tarung art workshop in Yogyakarta. At the same time he took part in the activities of the People's Cultural Association (Lekra), which was under the auspices of the Communist Party of Indonesia.

After the events of 30 September 1965 he was arrested and held in jail without trial and investigation until 1973. After his release from prison he worked in his workshop at the Anchol Arts Bazaar. Here he mastered a new genre - pictures on the boards, which became very popular among collectors.

But he did not abandon his old passion for wooden sculpture - a series of sculptures "Noah's Ark" in 1998 at the exhibition in the Cultural Center of Jakarta was recognized as the best work of the exhibition and was acquired by the museum of the university "Pelita Harapan". As for the pictures on the boards, the most impressive series is "China Town", which he made under the influence of anti-Chinese pogroms in 1998 and exhibited in the prestigious Mon Monk Gallery (1999). Later, another solo exhibition was held in this gallery (2004) and the Canna gallery (2005). The most significant collection of his paintings and sculptures belongs to the Indonesian collector Etti Mustafa, who has been collecting his works since 1995.

Amrus Natalsya died in Bogor on 31 January 2024, at the age of 90.

== Publications ==
- Puisi-Puisi Amrus Natalsya. Banjarmasin: Tahura Media, 2015

== See also ==
- Natalsya, Amrus (1933--) - Routledge Encyclopedia of Modernism
- Agus Dermawan T. Kayu-kayu berlagu: seni lukis kayu. [Jakarta]: Kawan Lama Abdi Bangsa, 2010. (Catalog of wooden painting by Amrus Natalsya)
