= Misbach Tamrin =

Indonesian artist

- Born: Misbach Tamrin; 25 August 1941 (age 85); Amuntai, South Kalimantan
- Education: Fine Arts of Indonesia in Yogyakarta (1964)
- Notable work: Kawan-kawanku (My friends) (1958); Gejolak Kerja (Labor enthusiasm) (1961); Peristiwa Trisakti (Events of Trisakti) (1998); Kota di Atas Air (City on the water) (1999)
- Movement: Bumi Tarung

Misbach Tamrin (born 25 August 1941, Amuntai, South Kalimantan) is an Indonesian artist.

== Brief biography ==
In 1964, he graduated from the Academy of Fine Arts of Indonesia in Yogyakarta. In 1961, together with other students (Amrus Natalsya, Kuslan Budiman, Adrianus Gumelar, Isa Hasand and others) created the art workshop "Bumi Tarung" (Land of Struggle) in Yogyakarta. In addition to painting, he created sculptures, bas-reliefs for monuments (for example, the monument Cahaya Bumi Selamat in Martapura). Since 1958, he began to take part in exhibitions at home and abroad. In 1962, with a floating exhibition on board the ship "Tampomas" he visited many countries in the Asia-Pacific region.

He participated in the activities of the People's Cultural Association (Lekra), which was under the auspices of the Communist Party of Indonesia. After the events of September 30, 1965 he was arrested and imprisoned until 1978 in Banjarmasin. Many pictures of the early period were lost.

After release from prison he continued painting. In 2008 he organized an exhibition "Bumi Tarung Workshop", and in 2011 the exhibition "50 Years of Bumi Tarung Workshop" in which artists who previously belonged to this group took part. In 2015, his solo retrospective exhibition was held at the National Gallery of Indonesia in Jakarta (65 canvases). In 2017, he took part in the exhibition "City of thousand rivers" (Banjarmasin).

The artist's paintings are monumental, created mainly in a realistic manner, some, especially of the early period are with a touch of impressionism. The main themes: the life of the common people, patriotism, revolution, history, September 30, 1965, events. He wrote and published several books on the art of Indonesia.

Several paintings by Misbach Tamrin are kept in the collection of the State Museum of Oriental Art (Moscow). In 2018, the Moscow publishing house Klyuch-S published an anthology of Malay virtual poetry "The Guests of the Sunset" in which the cover design was based upon artist's painting.

== Main pictures ==
- Kawan-kawanku (My Friends) (1958)
- Gejolak Kerja (Labor enthusiasm) (1961)
- Peristiwa Trisakti (Events of Trisakti) (1998)
- Kota di Atas Air (City on the water) (1999)
- Perjalanan Bumi Tarung (The Lfe of the Bumi Tarung group) (2001)
- Fosil dalam Sel (Fossil in solitary confinement) (2001)
- Mandau dan Telabang (Sword and Shield) (2002)
- Polisi-Polisi Dunia (World Gendarmes) (2005)
- Potret Kolektorku (Portrait of the Collector of my Paintings) (2005)
- Nelayan (Fisherman) (2007)
- Perpisahan (Farewell) (2007)
- Bumi Tarung 1965 (Bumi Tarung 1965) (2008)
- Penggusuran (Anger) (2008)
- Bertahan (Do not Give up) (2008)
- Mas Suparman (Mas Suparman) (2009)
- Berdialog dengan Kolektorku (Dialogue with the Collector of my Paintings) (2009)
- Cheng Ho Memimpin Perjalanan (Zheng He heads the expedition) (2009)
- Kesibukan Saat Fajar (The Pre-Dawn Hustle) (2009)
- Patriotisme vs Imperialisme (Patriotism vs Imperialism) (2010)
- Konser Pinggir Jalan (Concert on the Roadside) (2010)
- Perjuangan Perempuan Indonesia (The Struggle of Indonesian Women) (2011)
- Ibu Pertiwi Menangis (Tears of Motherland) (2011)
- Eksekusi di Tepi Jurang (Execution on the Edge of the Gorge) (2011)
- Purnama di Turba Pantai Trisik (Full Moon on the Coast of Trisik) (2011)
- Berderap Maju Demi Kelautan Nusantara (Forward for the Glory of Marine Nusantara) (2015)
- Membangun Indonesia Sebagai Poros Maritim Dunia (Let's Build Indonesia as the World's Sea Center) (2015)
- Kehidupan Pantai Nusantara (Life on the Sea shore of Nusantara) (2015)
- Personel Sanggar Bumi Tarung (Members of the Bumi Tarung Group) (2016)

== Publications ==
- Misbach Tamrin. "Pameran nasional grafik Lembaga Seni Rupa Indonesia Lekra" - Bambang Bujono dan Wicaksono Adi, ed. Seni Rupa Indonesia dalam Kritik dan Esai. Jakarta: Dewan Kesenian Jakarta, 2004, h. 151–153.
- Misbach Tamrin. Amrus Natalsya dan Bumi Tarung. Penerbit: Amnat Studio, 2008.
- Misbach Tamrin. Amrus Natalsya Wood Painting. Etty Mustafa Collection. Editor Misbach Tamrin, K.P. Hardi Danowijoyo. Jakarta: Rumah Budaya Hardi, 2014

== See also ==
- KERJA MANUSIA DAN MATAHARI - Sudut-sudut Cerita Masa Silam oleh Misbach Tamrin (bag II) [genosida 1965; tragedi 1965] -tragedi-1965 /
