= Cultural Manifesto =

Indonesian document (1963)

The Cultural Manifesto (Indonesian: Manifes Kebudajaan), (Note: Spelling based on the old Republican Spelling System that was used from 1947 to 1972. Under modern Indonesian orthography, the word Kebudajaan would be spelled as Kebudayaan.) often abbreviated to Manikebu (lit. 'buffalo sperm') by its detractors, was a document signed on 17 August 1963 by various Indonesian artists, intellectuals, and writers. The manifesto supported the values of "universal humanism" and rejected the social realism pushed by left-wing members of the Institute of People's Culture (Lekra). It was banned by President Sukarno in May 1964.

== Text ==
Indonesian (original)

Kami para seniman dan cendekiawan Indonesia dengan ini mengumumkan sebuah Manifes Kebudayaan, yang menyatakan pendirian, cita-cita politik Kebudayaan Nasional kami. Bagi kami kebudayaan adalah perjuangan untuk menyempurnakan kondisi hidup manusia. Kami tidak mengutamakan salah satu sektor kebudayaan di atas sektor kebudayaan yang lain. Setiap sektor berjuang bersama-sama untuk kebudayaan itu sesuai dengan kodratnya.

Dalam melaksanakan Kebudayaan Nasional, kami berusaha menciptakan dengan kesungguhan yang sejujur-jujurnya sebagai perjuangan untuk mempertahankan dan mengembangkan martabat diri kami sebagai bangsa Indonesia di tengah-tengah masyarakat bangsa-bangsa.

PANCASILA adalah falsafah kebudayaan kami.
Jakarta, 1 Agustus 1963

Translation:
English

We, the artists and intellectuals of Indonesia, hereby announce a Cultural Manifesto, which states the principles and political ideals of our National Culture. For us, culture is a struggle to improve the conditions of human life. We do not prioritize one cultural sector over another. Each sector strives together for culture in accordance with its nature.
In implementing National Culture, we strive to create with the utmost sincerity and honesty as a struggle to maintain and develop our dignity as the Indonesian nation within the community of nations.

PANCASILA is our cultural philosophy.
Jakarta, 1 August 1963

== Signatories ==
- HB Jassin
- Trisno Sumardjo
- Wiratmo Soekito
- Zaini
- Bokor Hutasuhut
- Gunawan Mohamad
- A. Bastari Asnin
- Bur Rasuanto
- Soe Hok Djin
- DS Moeljanto
- Ras Siregar
- Hartojo Andangdaja
- Sjahwil
- Djufri Tanissan
- Binsar Sitompul
- Gerson Poyk
- Taufiq Ismail
- M. Saribi
- Poernawan Tjondronegoro
- Ekana Siswojo
- Nashar
- Boen S. Oemarjati

== Aftermath ==
The Cultural Manifesto was banned by President Sukarno on 8 May 1964.
