= Affandi Museum =

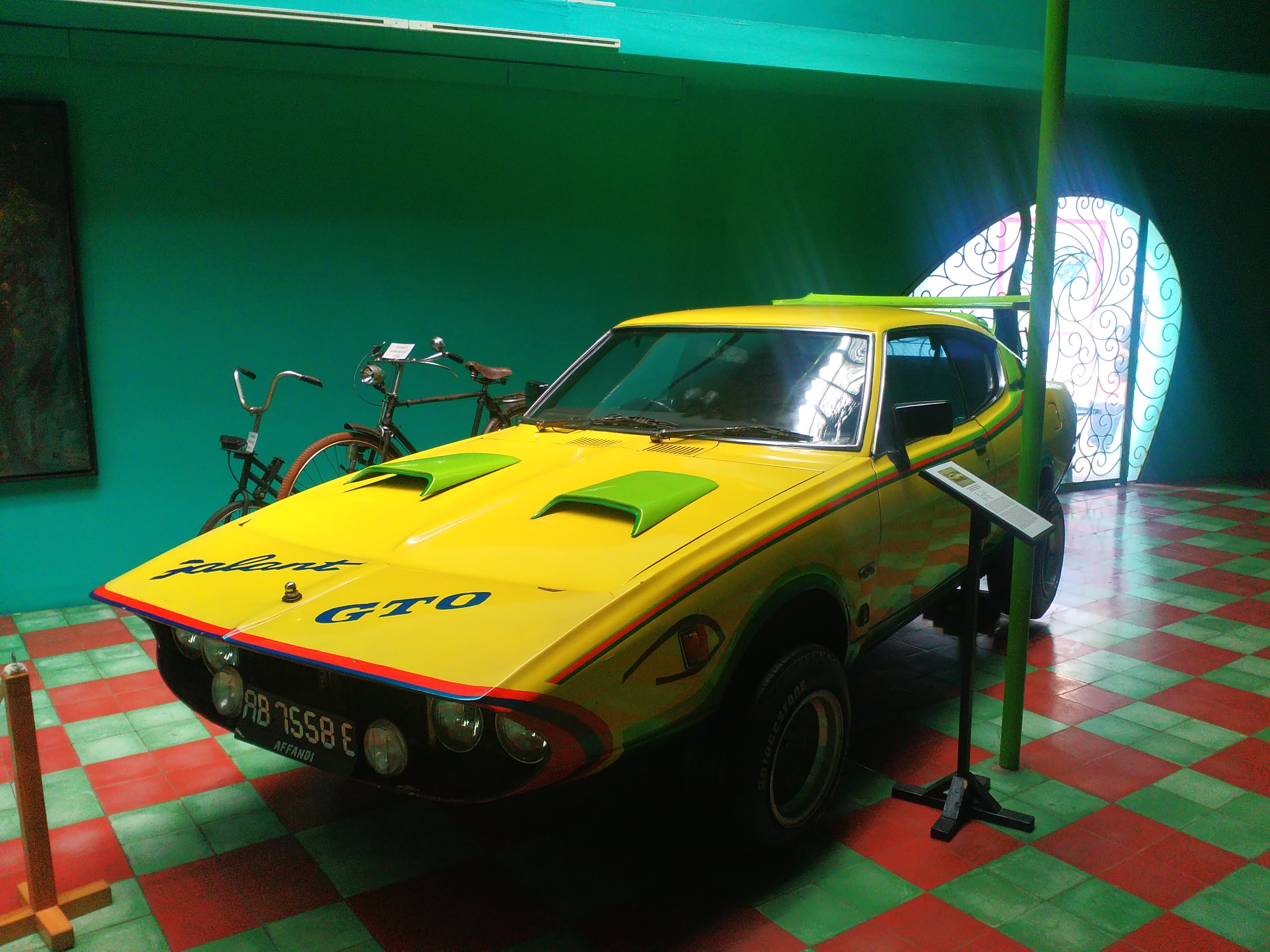
- Affandi's car and bike on display at his museum

- Location in Java
- Location: Depok, Sleman Regency, Yogyakarta, Indonesia
- Coordinates: 7.7827°S 110.3963°E
- Type: Art museum
- Visitors: 17,919 (2010)
- Public transit access: Trans Jogja: 1B, 4A, 5A (Jl. Solo - de Britto)
- Website: www.affandi.org

The Affandi Museum (Indonesian: Museum Affandi; Javanese: ꦩꦸꦱꦶꦪꦸꦩ꧀ꦄꦥ꦳꧀ꦥ꦳ꦤ꧀ꦢꦶ, lit. 'Musiyum Affandi') is a museum located in Sleman Regency, Special Region of Yogyakarta, Indonesia.

== Overview ==
On the bank of the Gajah Wong River on Laksda Adisucipto Street number 167, in 1953 the painter Affandi designed and constructed a home for himself which also functions as a museum to display his paintings, inaugurated on 15 December 1973. His house complex consists of his private house on stilts, a gallery with his retrospective works, a gifted gallery from the former president Soeharto in which exhibit his sketches and archives of his voyages throughout india, Europe, North America and South America, a three level building consists of a family and publicly open for rent gallery, a restoration studio, basement storage, a semi-open public space, and a painting studio for visitors. All the buildings are uniquely constructed, with a roof that resembles a banana leaf.

The museum has around 250 of Affandi's paintings. The high air humidity and temperature are causing concerns about the condition of the paintings. The Affandi Foundation, which manages the museum, finds it difficult to manage the museum properly, due to a lack of funds and revenue.

Before dying, Affandi spent a lot of time sitting around in his own museum, observing his paintings. He said once, "I want to die in simplicity without giving anyone unnecessary trouble, so I could go home to Him in peace."

After suffering a complication of illnesses, on May 23, 1990, Affandi died. He is now buried in the museum complex, as he wished to always be surrounded by his family and his works.

== Activities ==
The museum's activities studio, Gajah Wong Studio, holds painting classes for kids and adults. There are also workshops and painting demonstrations.

== Artworks ==
Several Affandi paintings are permanently exhibited in the Affandi Museum:

- Self-portrait, 1938
- Affandi and Kartika (Potret met dochter), 1939
- Nude (My Wife Maryati), 1940
- Kartika Painted Her Father, 1944
- Kids Play With Worm, 1943
- He Comes, Waits and Goes, 1944
- Line Up For Rice in Jakarta, 1948
- The Painter and His Daughter, 1950
- Place de Tertre, 1977
- Self Portrait of Sipping Pipe, 1977
- Embryo, 1988

Alongside this, Affandi also collected paintings from various painter colleagues, such as the works of Sindu Sudjojono, Basuki Abdullah, Amrus Natalsya (sculptures), Barli, Popo Iskandar, Hendra Gunawan and Batara Lubis.

== See also ==
- List of single-artist museums
