= Latief S. Nugraha =

Nugraha speaking in 2015

Latief S. Nugraha (born 6 September 1989) is an Indonesian poet, writer, editor, literary researcher, and cultural organizer. Born in Kulon Progo Regency, Special Region of Yogyakarta, he has been active in Yogyakarta's literary scene through poetry, literary research, editing, and literary programming. He has published two poetry collections, Menoreh Rumah Terpendam (2016) and Pada Suatu Hari yang Mungkin Tak Sebenarnya Terjadi (2020), as well as the literary study Sepotong Dunia Emha.

== Early life and education ==
Latief Setia Nugraha was born on 6 September 1989 in Gebang, Sidoharjo, Samigaluh, Kulon Progo Regency, Special Region of Yogyakarta. He studied Indonesian Language and Literature Education at Ahmad Dahlan University and subsequently completed postgraduate studies in Literary Studies at Gadjah Mada University.

In 2011, Nugraha was credited as an assistant director in a production of Kebebasan Abadi by Teater JAB at Ahmad Dahlan University and Societet Taman Budaya Yogyakarta.

== Literary career ==
Nugraha's literary work includes poetry, literary essays, and research. His first poetry collection, Menoreh Rumah Terpendam, was published in 2016. Poet Iman Budhi Santosa discussed the collection at a literary event in Kulon Progo in July 2017. A review published by Mata Budaya described the poems as engaging with anxiety and darker aspects of the lyrical speaker.

His second poetry collection, Pada Suatu Hari yang Mungkin Tak Sebenarnya Terjadi, was published in 2020. His poems have also appeared in literary publications and online literary media, including Bahasa Seorang Pembawa Pesan, Arena, Siklus, Oya, and Parangtritis.

== Literary research ==
Nugraha (centre) at Gadjah Mada University, 2013

In 2014, Nugraha completed a master's thesis at Gadjah Mada University entitled Emha Ainun Nadjib dalam Arena Sastra dan Arena Sosial. The study examined Emha Ainun Nadjib's position within the literary and social fields, including dispositions, strategies, agents, and forms of cultural achievement surrounding his literary career.

His research on Nadjib was later published as Sepotong Dunia Emha, a study of Nadjib's literary and social world.

== Editing and literary publishing ==
Nugraha has also worked as an editor and compiler of literary publications. His editorial bibliography includes Tiga Belas: Catatan Perjalanan Studio Pertunjukan Sastra (2013), Pawestren (2013), Lintang Panjer Wengi di Langit Yogya (2014), Sesotya Prabangkara ing Langit Ngayogya (2014), Bolak-balik Bulaksumur (2014), Astana Kastawa (2014), Astana Kastawa II (2015), Ngelmu Iku Kelakone kanthi Laku: Proses Kreatif Sastrawan Yogyakarta (2016), and Njajah Desa Milang Kori: Proses Kreatif Novelis Yogyakarta (2017).

In 2017, he edited Kota, Ingatan, dan Jalan Pulang, an anthology of poems by winners and selected participants in a poetry-writing competition for teenagers in the Special Region of Yogyakarta, published by Balai Bahasa DIY.

His editorial work has also included literary and humanities publications. He was credited as an editor of the Indonesian edition of Michel Foucault's Arkeologi Pengetahuan (The Archaeology of Knowledge), published by Basabasi in 2019, and of Hasan Aspahani's novel Laut Semua Suara, also published in 2019.

== Studio Pertunjukan Sastra ==
Nugraha has been associated with Studio Pertunjukan Sastra (SPS), a literary organisation and performance collective in Yogyakarta. His involvement included literary programming, publication, and the organisation of literary events.

In 2016, ANTARA identified Nugraha as a coordinator of SPS's annual Pesta Puisi Akhir Tahun. At the time, its Bincang-Bincang Sastra programme had reached its 134th edition.

In 2019, Nugraha was identified as the carik of Studio Pertunjukan Sastra and was involved in Jentera, a literary performance programme at Taman Budaya Yogyakarta.

== Literary and cultural programming ==
Nugraha has continued to participate in literary education and cultural programming in Yogyakarta. In 2024, he was one of the instructors for a poetry class held as part of Temu Karya Sastra, a programme organised by the Yogyakarta cultural authorities.

In February 2025, he was among the speakers at the literary discussion Yogyakarta Ibu Kota Buku Sastra, organised by Taman Budaya Yogyakarta.

In 2025, Nugraha was also an alumnus of the Majelis Sastra Asia Tenggara (MASTERA). He was involved in the Festival Kebudayaan Yogyakarta 2025 as both a researcher and a literature programmer. The festival's official programme lists him under the research team and as Programmer Sastra in its programme division.

== Works ==
=== Poetry collections ===
- Menoreh Rumah Terpendam (2016)
- Pada Suatu Hari yang Mungkin Tak Sebenarnya Terjadi (2020)

=== Literary study ===
- Sepotong Dunia Emha

=== Edited and compiled works ===
- Tiga Belas: Catatan Perjalanan Studio Pertunjukan Sastra (2013)
- Pawestren (2013)
- Lintang Panjer Wengi di Langit Yogya (2014)
- Sesotya Prabangkara ing Langit Ngayogya (2014)
- Bolak-balik Bulaksumur (2014)
- Astana Kastawa (2014)
- Astana Kastawa II (2015)
- Ngelmu Iku Kelakone kanthi Laku: Proses Kreatif Sastrawan Yogyakarta (2016)
- Njajah Desa Milang Kori: Proses Kreatif Novelis Yogyakarta (2017)
- Kota, Ingatan, dan Jalan Pulang (2017)
