= Djoko Pekik =

Indonesian artist (1937–2023)

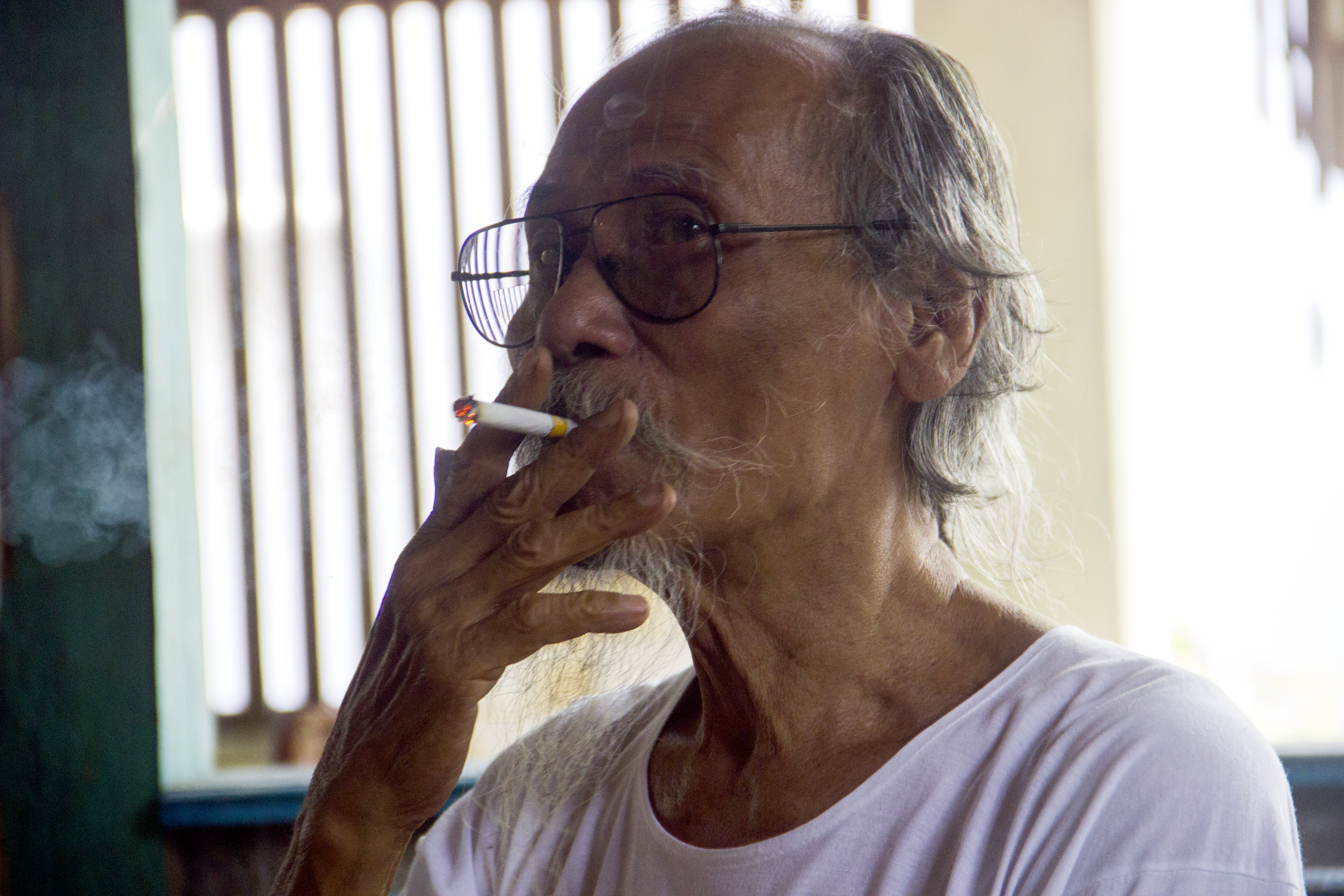
Image of Djoko Pekik

Djoko Pekik (2 January 1937 – 12 August 2023) was an Indonesian artist known for his achievements in painting and sculpture. His artistic prominence flourished during the dynamic period of the 1960s. He received his artistic training at the Akademi Seni Rupa Indonesia (ASRI) located in Yogyakarta.

A significant moment in Djoko Pekik's career unfolded in 1964, when an exhibition organized by LEKRA showcased his artworks among the top-tier creations in the country. However, this era was marked by political upheaval in Indonesia, with LEKRA facing allegations of supporting the communist party. These circumstances led to Djoko's unfortunate imprisonment from 1965 to 1972 due to his affiliation with LEKRA.

Djoko's artistic output from the late 1980s to the 1990s holds high value in the art world. These creations are prized for their distinctive theme of social realism, vividly capturing the artist's intense emotions on the canvas. One of the most celebrated pieces from this period is Djoko's masterpiece titled 'Berburu Celeng,' completed in 1998.

Djoko Pekik died on 12 August 2023, at the age of 86.
