= Andre Vltchek =

American writer and filmmaker

André Vltchek
- Born: December 29, 1963; Leningrad, Soviet Union
- Died: September 22, 2020 (aged 56); Istanbul, Turkey
- Occupations: Journalist; writer; filmmaker
- Website: andrevltchek.weebly.com

André Vltchek (Russian: Андре Влчек, [ɐnˈdrɛ ˈvɫ̩t͡ɕɛk], December 29, 1963 – September 22, 2020) was a Soviet-born American political analyst, journalist, and a filmmaker. Vltchek was born in Leningrad but later became a naturalized U.S. citizen after being granted asylum there in his 20s. He lived in the United States, Chile, Peru, Mexico, Vietnam, Samoa, and Indonesia.

Vltchek covered armed conflicts in Peru, Kashmir, Mexico, Bosnia, Sri Lanka, Congo, India, South Africa, East Timor, Indonesia, Turkey, and the Middle East. He traveled to more than 140 countries, and wrote articles for Der Spiegel, Japanese newspaper The Asahi Shimbun, The Guardian, ABC News and the Czech Republic daily Lidové noviny. From 2004, Vltchek served as a senior fellow at the Oakland Institute.

Commenting on Vltchek's book Oceania, published in 2010, American linguist Noam Chomsky said that it evoked "the reality of the contemporary world" and that "He has also not failed to trace the painful — and particularly for the West, shameful realities to their historical roots".

== Biography ==
André Vltchek was born on December 29, 1963, in Leningrad (present-day Saint Petersburg), Soviet Union. His father was a Czech nuclear physicist and his mother a Russo-Chinese painter. He was raised in Plzeň, Czechoslovakia before emigrating to the United States. Until his death, he was based in Asia and Africa.

On September 22, 2020, he died, seemingly in his sleep, whilst being chauffeured in his car in Istanbul, Turkey. While his death was initially deemed suspicious by the police, his wife later confirmed that he had been unwell and died from complications related to diabetes.

== Documentaries ==
In 2004, he produced and directed a documentary film about the Indonesian mass killings of 1965–66, Terlena – Breaking of The Nation. Right after a devastating earthquake that shook Chile in February 2010, Vltchek travelled to Chile and produced a documentary titled Chile Between Two Earthquakes.

For UNESCO, Vltchek wrote and directed a film Tumaini about social collapse and devastation caused by HIV pandemic in communities around Lake Victoria in Kenya. In 2012, he wrote and directed the documentary One Flew Over Dadaab to depict the 20-year long tragedy of Somali refugees in the largest refugee camps in the world (Dadaab, in Northern Kenya).

In 2013, Vltchek produced and directed the documentary film Rwanda Gambit, broadcast by Press TV. It aims at reversing the official narrative on the 1994 Rwandan genocide, exposing the Rwandan and Ugandan plunder of the Democratic Republic of the Congo on behalf of Western imperialism.

In March 2019, Vltchek was the keynote speaker for the "No to NATO and War — Yes to Peace and Progress" meeting and rally, held in Regina, Saskatchewan, Canada, and interviewed on Regina Community Radio.

== Publications ==
=== Non-fiction and investigative journalism ===
- New Capital of Indonesia: Abandoning Destitute Jakarta, Moving to Plundered Borneo. PT Badak Merah Semesta. 2020. ISBN 978-602-509-549-8. — a passionate argument against Indonesia's capital relocation
- China's Belt and Road Initiative: Connecting Countries Saving Millions of Lives. PT Badak Merah Semesta. 2019. ISBN 978-602-509-548-1.
- China and Ecological Civilization: John B. Cobb, Jr. in Conversation with Andre Vltchek. PT Badak Merah Semesta. 2019. ISBN 978-602-509-545-0.
- Por Lula (Portuguese ed.). PT Badak Merah Semesta. 2018. ISBN 978-602-509-542-9.
- Revolutionary Optimism, Western Nihilism. PT Badak Merah Semesta. 2018. 286 pp. ISBN 978-602-509-541-2.
- The Great October Socialist Revolution: Impact on the World and the Birth of Internationalism. PT Badak Merah Semesta. 2017. ISBN 978-602-735-439-5.
- Exposing Lies of the Empire. PT Badak Merah Semesta. 2015. 822 pp. ISBN 978-602-700-586-0.
- Fighting Against Western Imperialism. PT Badak Merah Semesta. 2014. ISBN 978-602-700-582-2. — about the rise of Western imperialism
- On Western Terrorism: From Hiroshima to Drone Warfare. With Noam Chomsky. Pluto Press. 2013. ISBN 978-0-7453-3387-8. — a discussion on Western power and propaganda with Noam Chomsky
- Oceania: Neocolonialism, Nukes and Bones. Atuanui Press. 2013. ISBN 978-0-9922453-3-7. — an in-depth analysis of the entire Pacific region and its "destruction" by traditional and neocolonial powers
- Indonesia: Archipelago of Fear. Pluto Press. 2012. ISBN 978-0-7453-3199-7. — about post–1965 Indonesia, a collapsed state
- Exile: Conversations with Pramoedya Ananta. With Rosie Indira and Nagesh Rao. Haymarket Books. 2006. ISBN 1-931859-28-0. — conversations with the Southeast Asian writer Pramoedya Ananta Toer
- Western Terror: From Potosi to Baghdad. Mainstay Press. 2006. ISBN 0-9774590-3-9.

=== Fiction ===
Vltchek was the author of several novels and plays.

- Aurora (1st ed.). Badak Merah Semesta. 2016. ISBN 978-602-735-436-4.
- Plays: 'Ghost of Valparaiso' and 'Conversations with James'. Badak Merah Semesta. 2014. ISBN 978-602-700-585-3.
- Point of No Return (2nd ed.). Mainstay Press. 2013. ISBN 978-0-9774590-7-0.
- Liberation Lit. with Tony Christini. Mainstay Press. 2010. ISBN 978-0-9774590-6-3.
- Nalezený, a novel published in Czech
