= Zaini (surname) =

Zaini is a surname. Notable people with the surname include:

- Helmy Faishal Zaini (born 1972), Indonesian politician
- Hill Zaini (born 1987), Bruneian singer and actor
- Jassim Zaini (1943–2012), Qatari artist
- Mohd Annuar Zaini (born 1951), Malaysian administrative figure
- Shahrin Zaini (born 1985), Bruneian former footballer
- Shahrol Yuzy Ahmad Zaini (born 1976) Malaysian motorcycle Grand Prix rider
- Yahya Zaini (born 1964), Indonesian politician

== See also ==
- Zaini (given name)
