= Zaini (given name) =

Zaini is a masculine given name of Arabic origin. Notable people with the name include:

== Given name ==
- Zaini Abdullah (1940–2026), Indonesian politician and former activist
- Zaini Ahmad (born 1935), Bruneian civil servant, writer, and nationalist activist
- Zaini Mohd Said, Malaysian retired Army general officer

== See also ==
- Zaini (surname)
