= Tugu Muda =

Coordinates: 6.9843485°S 110.4093207°E

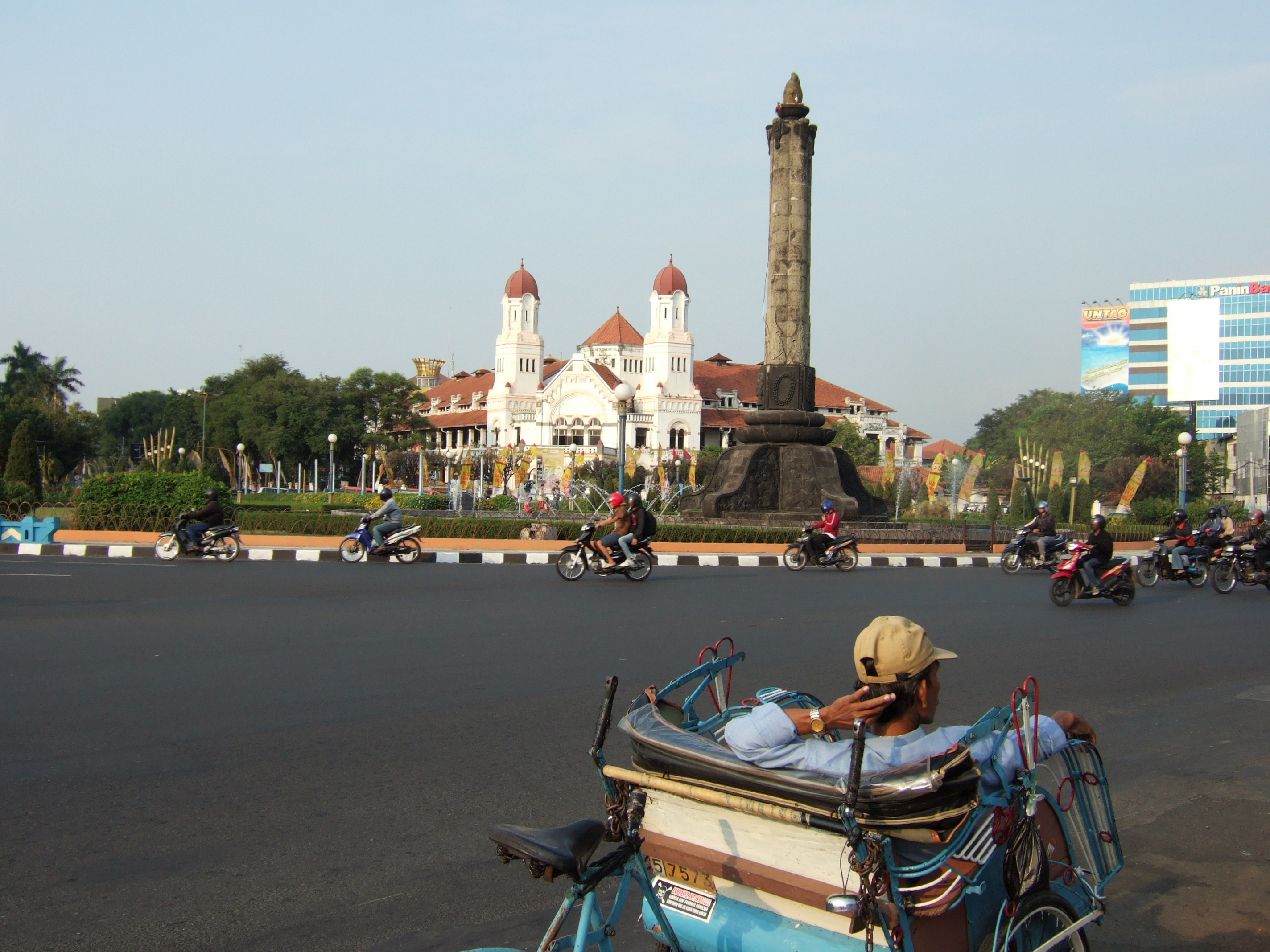
Tugu Muda on right

Tugu Muda ("Youth Monument") is a stone monument in Semarang, Central Java commemorating the struggle for independence by Indonesian youth. It was dedicated by President Sukarno on 20 May 1953 to commemorate the continuous five-day battle between the youth of Semarang and a Japanese battalion led by Major Kido from 14 to 19 October 1945.

Japanese forces drove the Dutch from Indonesia as the "elder brother of Asia"; however, the Japanese were crueler to dissidents than their Dutch counterparts.

The stone monument consists of a foundation, body and head. One side of the monument is done in relief, with ornamental ponds and gardens surrounding it.
