= Kartika Affandi =

Indonesian artist (born 1934)

Kartika Affandi-Koberl
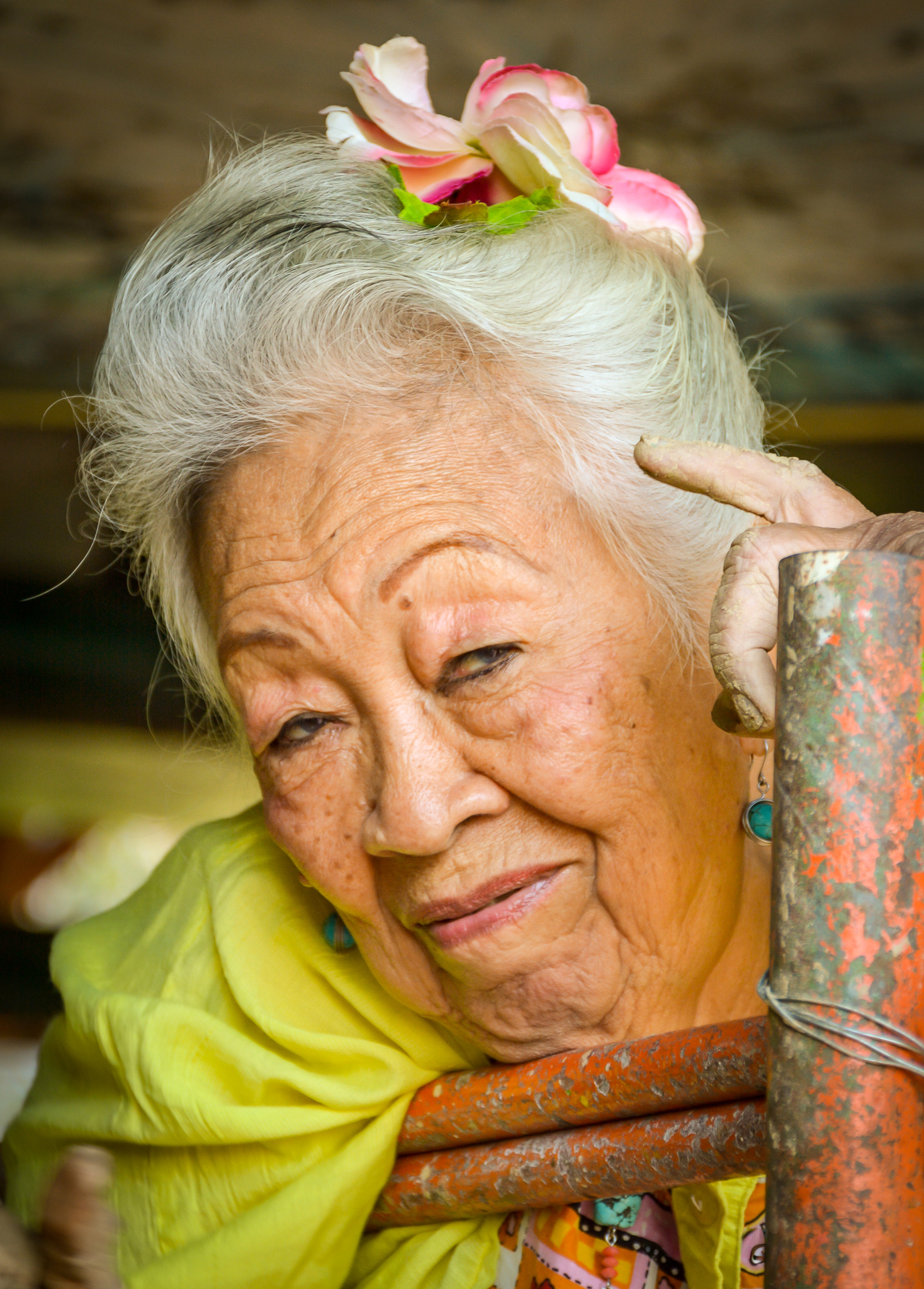
- Kartika Affandi in 2019
- Born: 27 November 1934 (age 91); Batavia, Dutch East Indies
- Occupation: Painter

Kartika Affandi-Koberl (born 27 November 1934), is an Indonesian artist born into a family of artists.

== Biography ==
Kartika Affandi was born in Batavia, Dutch East Indies (present-day Jakarta, Indonesia) in 1934, the only child of artists Affandi and Maryati. Kartika in 1952 married R.M. Saptohoedojo, a painter. She has eight children. Kartika's relationship with her husband was strained by his polygamy and also his stinginess with the paint they shared, and they divorced in 1972. In 1985, she married Austrian Gerhard Koberl, a yoga and meditation teacher. They separated in 1994 and divorced in 2001.

== Artistic career ==
From the age of seven, Kartika was instructed by Affandi in how to paint with fingers and tubes directly on the canvas. Any mixing of colours is done on her hands and wrists. Kartika has no permanent studio; like Affandi, she prefers to paint outside in the village environment where she interacts directly with her subjects and on-lookers. This contrasts with most contemporary Indonesian painters, who work in their studios from mind-images, memory, photographs or sketches.

Born in 1930s, when men still dominated the art world, Kartika is among a small group of women painters who from the mid-1980s succeeded in exhibiting their work on a regular basis and in gaining limited critical recognition. Even in this context, Kartika's art has been described as unique, ranging from conventional to subversive.

In a culture where the individual self rarely is put to the fore, Kartika had made the self-portrait one of her main themes. In a society where emotion is suppressed, both publicly and privately, Kartika fills her canvases with intense feeling. In a culture where genitals are considered taboo in representation, Kartika has painted her own nudity graphically and without the prescribed, distancing sweetness, never depicting the body as an object of pleasure, whether that of others or her own.

Given their close bond, Kartika painted penetrating portraits of her father, right through to his final years of debilitating illness. Another provocative portrait, Hindu Priest, shows an old man, close up, as he walks on a beach. His face is preoccupied, intense - a face that might have been taken from an Ingmar Bergman movie. There is nothing here of the glamour, romance or mystical aura that so often characterises images from Bali such as in O.H. Supono's Balinese Priest.

=== Focus ===
Following in the populist footsteps of Affandi, Kartika has often painted rural and dispossessed people such as fishermen, farmers, workers and beggars. Since these individuals pose while interacting with her and exchanging life histories as she paints, these must be considered portraits. Although narrative, her paintings when viewed close up dissolve into strong, abstract statements in energetically applied impasto oils. Kartika's work ranges from the sweet and idyllic to an expressive realism that can be harsh. The latter is evident in her paintings of beggars, handicapped people and suffering animals and in her uncompromising depiction of the progress of old age, whether painting a stranger, her father, or herself.

Kartika's career experienced a resurgence around 1980, when she studied painting restoration in Austria to enable her to repair Affandi's deteriorating paintings. Here, solitude and reflection paved the way for her most unusual portraits.

== Travels and exhibitions ==
Kartika received international critical praise for her work in the 1990s. She visited Australia in 1991 for an exhibition that covered Canberra, Sydney and Melbourne. She also visited the United States in the 1990s.

Her work was exhibited in the mid-2000s and she reflected upon her career and art. Her paintings were also exhibited in the 2010s.

== Documentary ==
Kartika is the subject of a 2018 documentary film, Kartika Affandi: 9 Ways of Seeing, by Christopher Basile.

== Bibliography ==
- Art and Asia Pacific. 1 (3): 62–72. 1994.
- Krantz, Claire Wolf (July 1, 1996). "On their own terms". Art in America.
- Emmerson, Donald K. (30 June 1998). Indonesia Beyond Suharto. M.E. Sharpe. p. 284. ISBN 1-56324-889-1.
