= Affandi =

Indonesian artist (1907–1990)

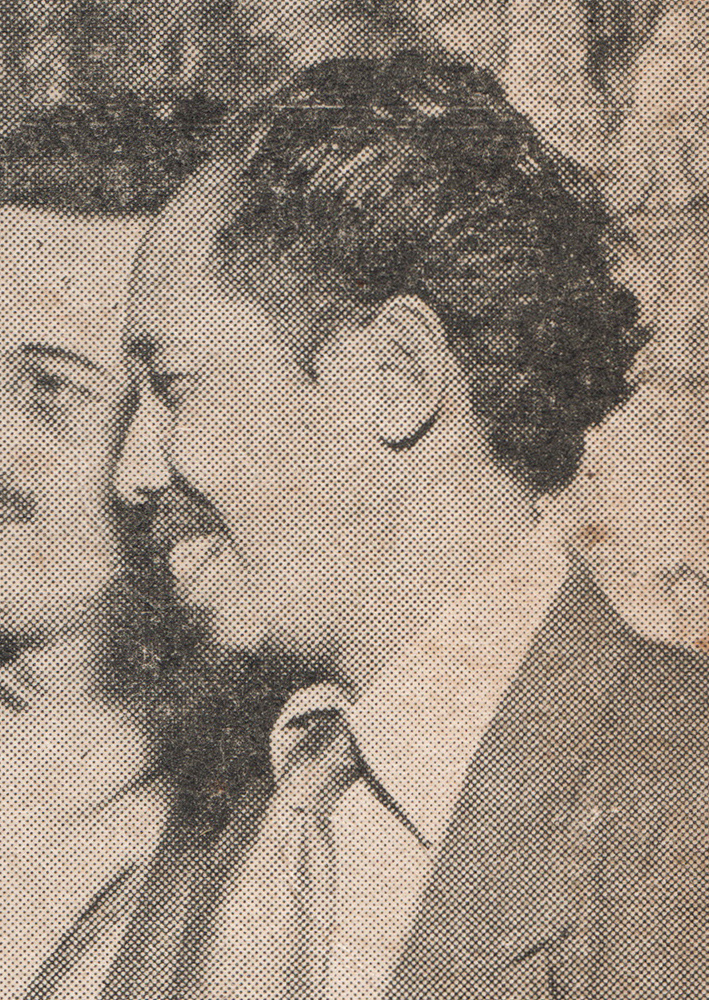
- Affandi in 1953
- Born: Affandi Koesoema c. 1907; Cirebon, Dutch East Indies (present-day Indonesia)
- Died: 23 May 1990 (aged 82–83); Yogyakarta, Indonesia
- Occupation: Painter
- Movement: Expressionist; abstract art
- Children: 2, including Kartika Affandi
- Memorials: Affandi Museum

Member of the Constitutional Assembly
- In office 9 November 1956 – 5 July 1959

Affandi (c. 1907 – 23 May 1990) was an Indonesian artist. Born in Cirebon, West Java, as the son of R. Koesoema, who was a surveyor at a local sugar factory, Affandi finished his upper secondary school in Jakarta. He gave up his studies to pursue his desire to become an artist. Beginning in 1934, Affandi began teaching himself how to paint. He married Maryati, a fellow artist. One of his children, Kartika, also became an artist. Affandi is considered Indonesia's foremost Expressionist painter.

== Early life ==
Wisdom of the East, fresco mural in Jefferson Hall, East-West Center, Honolulu, by Affandi, 1967

Affandi was born in 1907, in Cirebon. His father was R. Koesoemah. When he was a child, his father wanted him to be a doctor; however, Affandi was interested in drawing.

== Artistic career ==
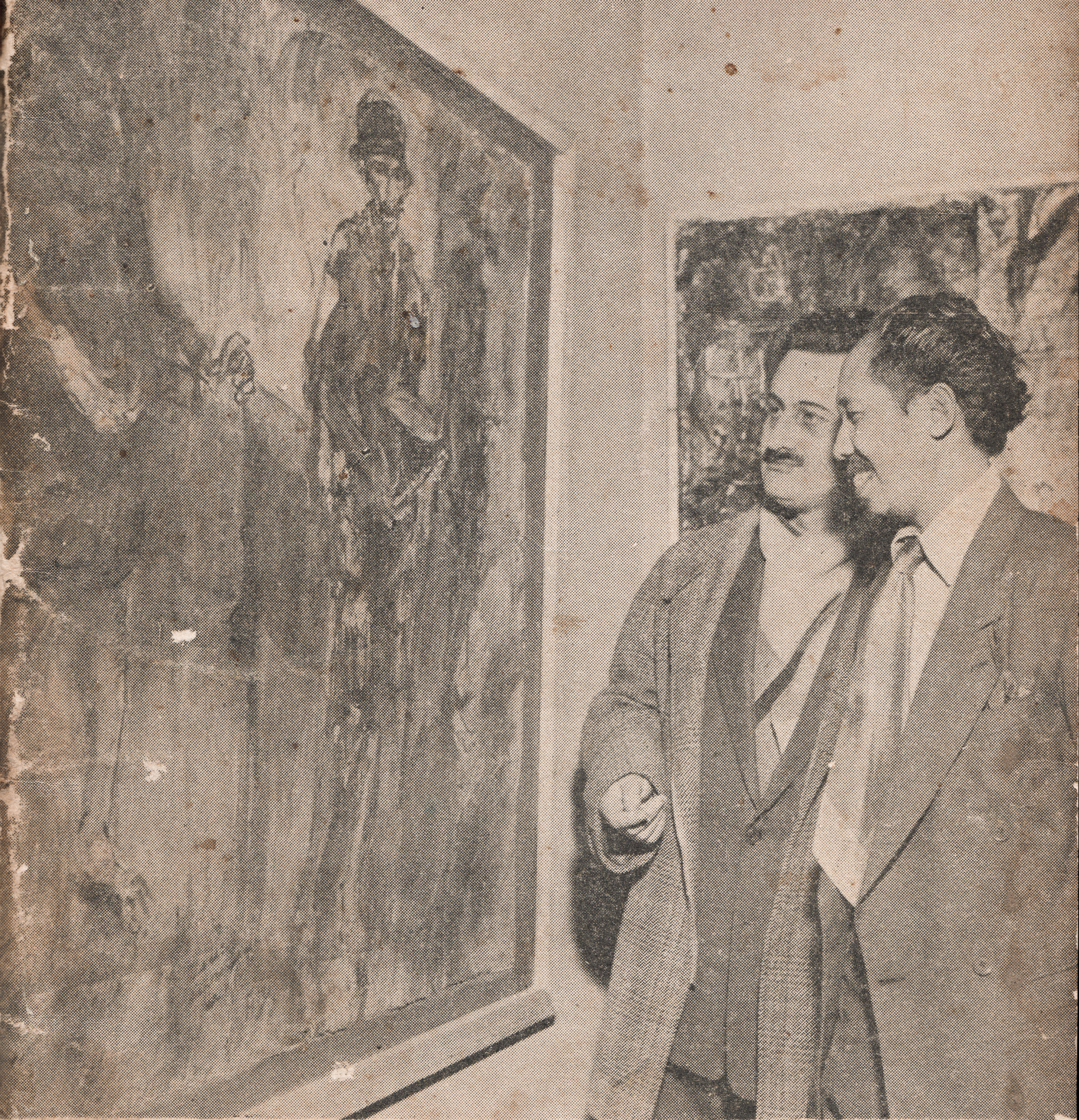
Affandi (far right) at an exhibition in Paris, 1953

In the 1950s, Affandi began to create expressionist paintings. The piece Carrying the First Grandchild (1953) marked his newfound style known as "squeezing the tube". Affandi painted by directly squeezing the paint out of its tube. He came across this technique by accident, when he intended to draw a line one day. As he lost his patience when he was looking for a missing pencil, he applied the paint directly from its tube. The resulting effect, as he found out, was that the painted object appeared more alive. He also felt more freedom to express his feelings when he used his own hands, instead of a paint brush. In certain respects, he has acknowledged similarities with Vincent van Gogh.

Like most of his Indonesian contemporaries, Affandi grew up largely cut off from the mainstream of modern art. It wasn't until the late 1930s that the first exhibitions of major Western artists – from Gauguin to Kandinsky and Picasso – were held in Batavia (today's Jakarta). Affandi was particularly fascinated by the Javanese wayang, or shadow-play. He followed his family to Bandung and then to Batavia, honing his skill at drawing and then at oil painting. By the time he began painting seriously, in 1940, he had at various times been a housepainter, a cinema ticket-collector, and a billboard artist. He would save paints left over from the posters and his other jobs and paint landscapes. Soon he was exhibiting – and, as a surprise to himself – actually selling. With his wife's consent, he decided to devote the first ten days of each month to his trade, and the remaining twenty to his art.

His only teachers were a few reproductions that he saw in copies of Studio, an art magazine from London. He felt a kinship with the Impressionists, with Goya and with Edvard Munch, as well as the earlier masters, Breughel, Hieronymus Bosch and Botticelli. Their influence began to show in his paintings. But the grim realities around Affandi made an even greater mark on him. In Yogjakarta one day, just after the Pacific War, Affandi sat painting a market place where folk were grubbing about, half-starved and half-naked. Infuriated at his seeming unconcern, a youth threw dust at the artist and his canvas, shouting: "This man is mad! While our people are naked he paints them on canvas and makes a bad painting we cannot understand."

Affandi himself said:

One day an art collector looked in my studio and said he couldn't select any of my paintings because the paintings he saw hurt his feelings. He asked me why I didn't make paintings of beautiful objects: landscapes, girls, and so forth. I too like beautiful things, but they do not necessary provide inspiration for my work. My subjects are expressive rather than beautiful. I paint suffering – an old woman, a beggar, a black mountain ... My great wish is that people learn a little from my work. I do know the danger of doing paintings with this in mind. I have no intention of becoming a social propagandist, and I must be careful. One day, in India, visiting a village with my daughter Kartika, I saw a dead body covered by a mattress. Kartika said "That's a good subject for you." I felt very touched by what we had seen, but I told her I would not paint it. My next painting was of a flower, in reality very fresh, but which on my canvas lacked all life.

Some of Affandi's most creative years were spent in India, where he travelled and painted from 1949 to 1951. From there, he went to Europe, showing his paintings at the major capitals (among them Paris, London, Brussels, and Rome). Affandi visited the United States thrice, teaching at Ohio State University and painting a mural at the East-West Center in Hawaii. He also displayed his works in the biennale in Brazil (1952), Venice (1954), and won an award there, and São Paulo (1956). In 1957, he received a scholarship from the United States government to study arts education. He was appointed as an Honorary Professor in Painting by Ohio State University in Columbus. In 1974, he received an honorary doctorate from University of Singapore, the Peace Award from the Dag Hammarskjoeld Foundation in 1977, and the title of Grand Maestro in Florence, Italy.

== Museum ==
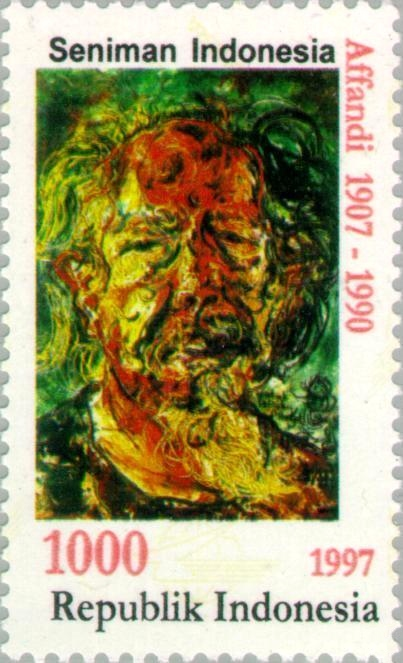
Affandi, self-portrait on a 1997 stamp

In Yogyakarta, where he has lived since 1945, Affandi designed for himself a free-form house that has become a stopping place for tourists as well as tourists visiting the old town. The place, located in Sleman Regency, also functions as a museum to display his paintings. The museum has around 250 of Affandi's paintings.

Affandi says that he was struck with the idea for its architecture one day during a rainstorm. He had been walking in the surroundings hills, and took shelter under a huge tree with large leaves. The roof of Affandi's house is shaped like a leaf from this tree, and the high single room sits elevated on structures that resemble two tree trunks. Additional support is provided by the tree trunks richly carved by the famous Balinese sculptor, Nyoman Tjokot.

Affandi had two wives. The only child from his first marriage, Kartika, has become a painter herself. A few years later, the artist took a second wife, who has borne him three children. One of his more memorable paintings shows him nude, holding a newborn grandchild, under a blue sky filled with stars.

Regrettably, the high air humidity and temperature are causing concerns about the condition of the paintings. The Affandi Foundation, who manages the museum, finds it difficult to manage the museum properly, due to a lack of funds and revenue.

Before his death, Affandi spent a lot of time sitting around in his own museum, observing his paintings. He said once, "I want to die in simplicity without giving anyone unnecessary trouble, so I could go home to Him in peace."

== Death and legacy ==
Affandi died on 23 May 1990, at the age of 83. He is now buried in the museum complex, as he wished to always be surrounded by his family and his works.

One of main roads connecting Sleman Regency and Yogyakarta, Jalan Affandi (previously Jalan Gejayan), is named after him.
