= Indonesian painting =

Indonesian Painting
- Lukisan orang Indonesia
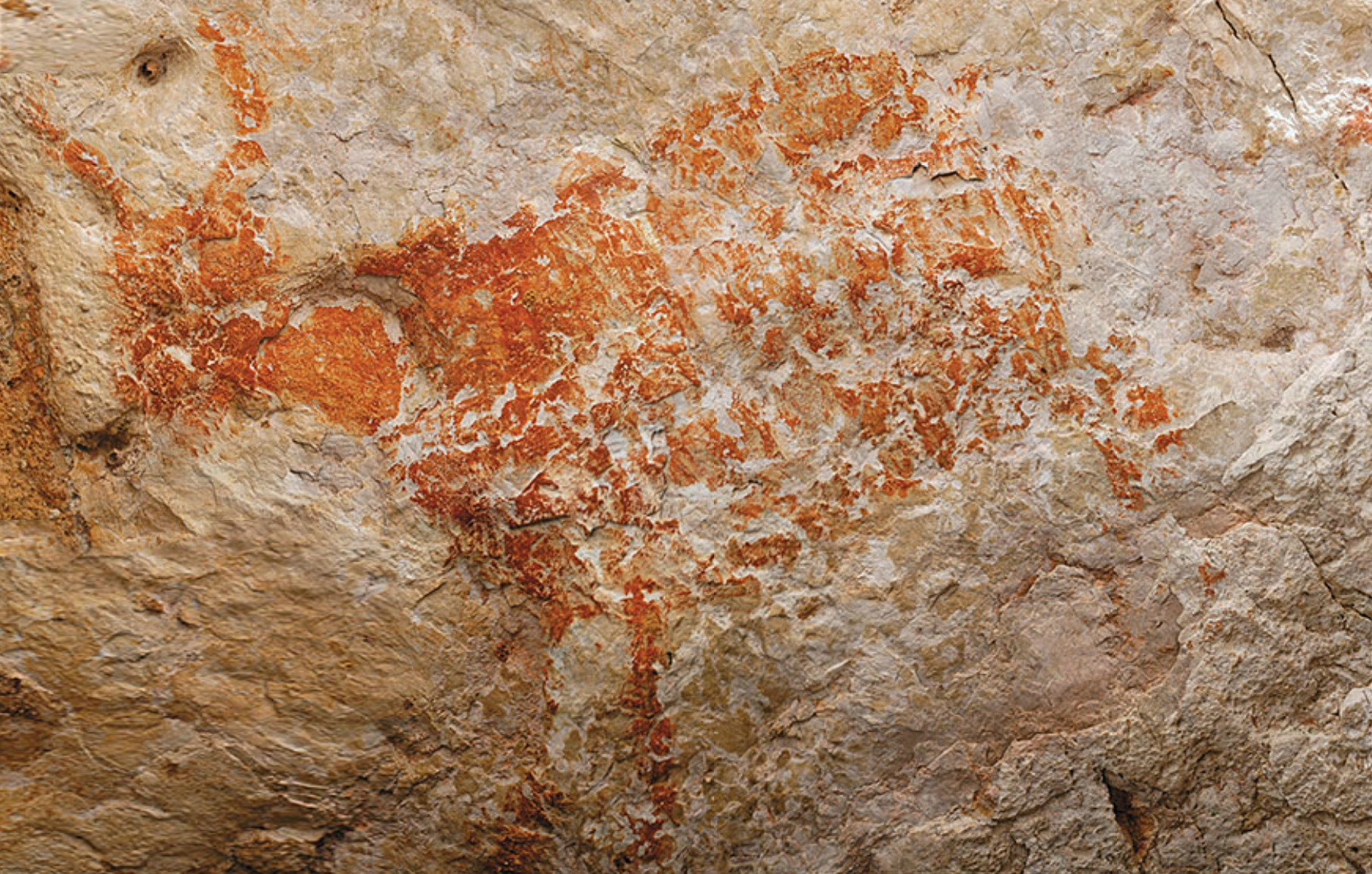
- One of the oldest known figurative paintings in the world, a depiction of a bull, has been dated to be 40,000 years old.
- Periods: Paleolithic - Modern
- Region: Indonesian Archipelago

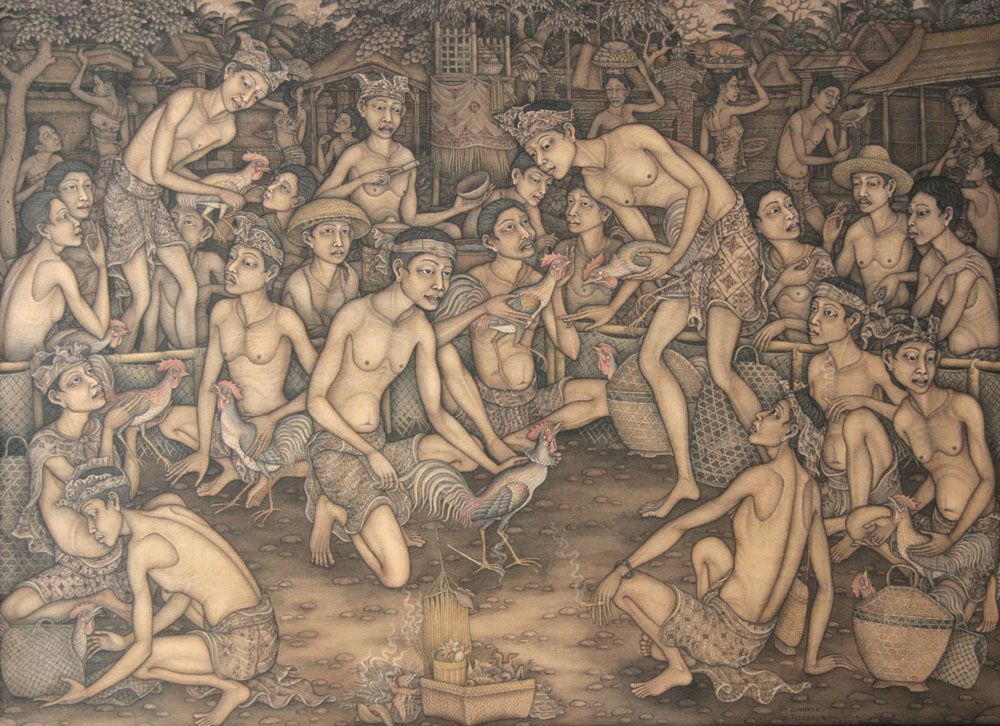
Traditional Balinese painting depicting cockfighting

Indonesian painting has a very long tradition and history in Indonesian art, though because of the climatic conditions very few early examples survive, Indonesia is home to some of the oldest paintings in the world. The earliest Indonesian paintings were the rock paintings of prehistoric times, such as the petroglyphs found in places like in the caves in the district of Maros in Sulawesi, Indonesia. The Stone Age rock paintings found in Maros Cave are approximately 40,000 years old and are listed as one of the oldest paintings in the world.

In November 2018, however, scientists reported the discovery of the then-oldest known figurative art painting, over 40,000 (perhaps as old as 52,000) years old, of an unknown animal, in the cave of Lubang Jeriji Saléh on the Indonesian island of Borneo (Kalimantan). In December 2019, figurative cave paintings depicting pig hunting in the Maros-Pangkep karst in Sulawesi were estimated to be even older, at at least 43,900 years old. The finding was noted to be “the oldest pictorial record of storytelling and the earliest figurative artwork in the world”. And more recently, in 2021, cave art of a pig found in an Indonesian island, and dated to over 45,500 years, has been reported.

== Prehistoric ==
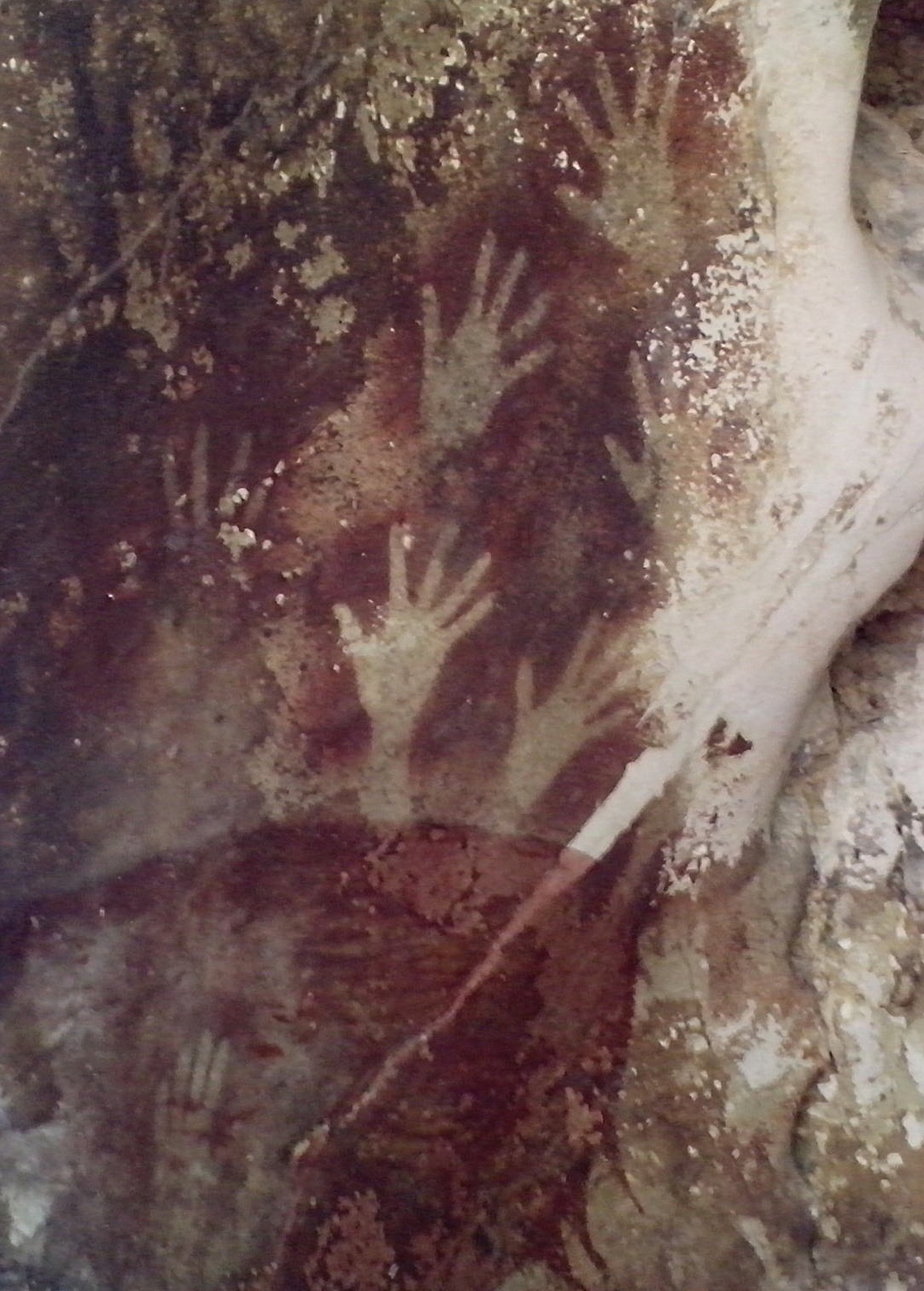
Pettakere Cave "Hand print paintings", The oldest known cave paintings are more than 44,000 years old, Maros, South Sulawesi, Indonesia

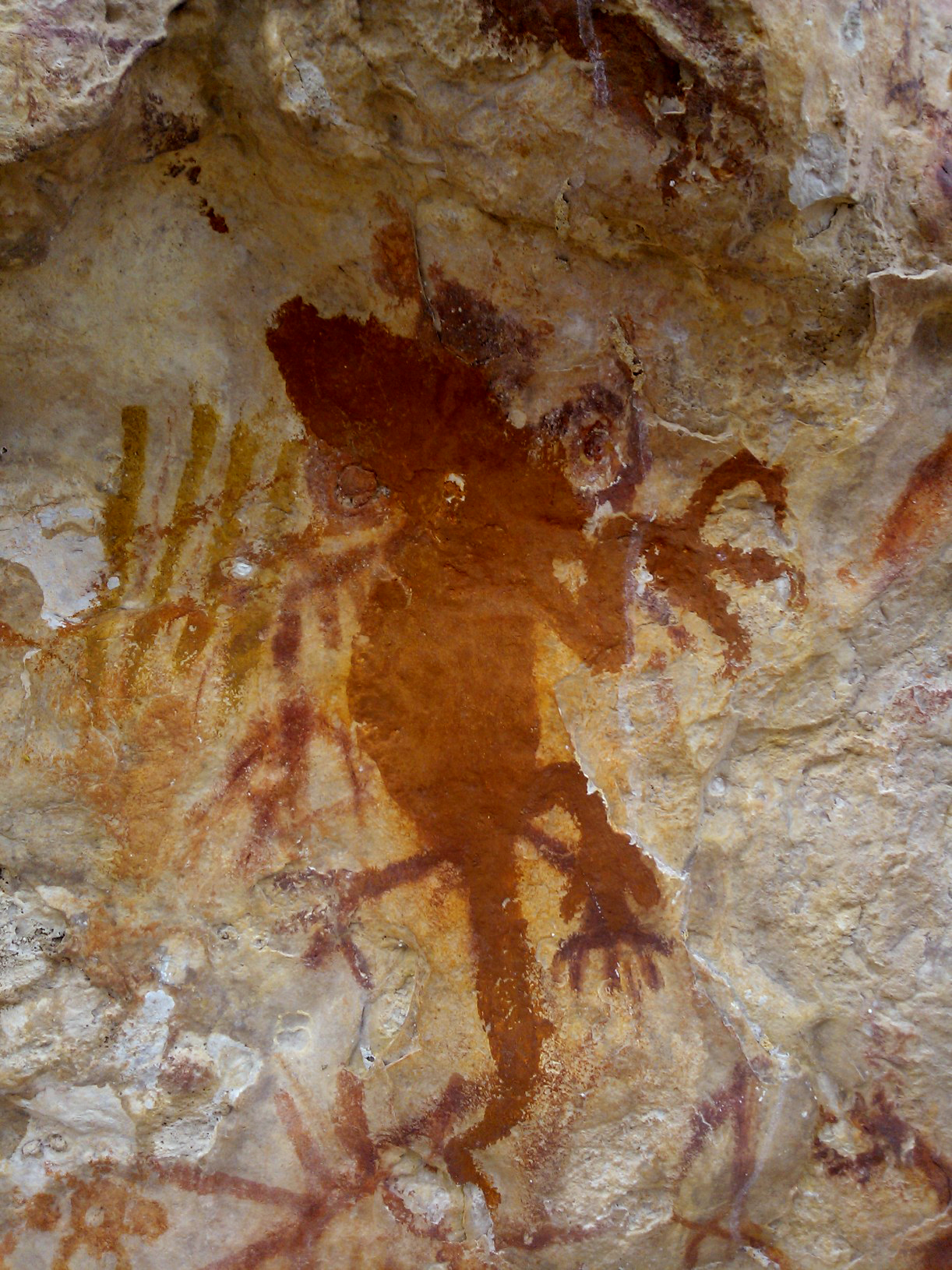
An ancient painting of a lizard in Papua, one of the oldest cave paintings in Indonesia

In prehistoric times, painting played an important role because every painting had a specific meaning and purpose. At that time the paintings were made on cave walls and rocks. One of the techniques used by cave people to paint on cave walls is by placing their hands on the cave walls, then spraying them with chewing leaves or colored mineral stones. This spraying technique is known as the aerograph. Another medium used to make paintings is clay. The dyes used come from natural ingredients such as minerals and animal fats. In general, the purpose and theme chosen for making these paintings are magical.

Examples of prehistoric paintings can be seen at Leang Pattakere Cave in Maros, South Sulawesi. The painting depicts a hunting scene. In addition, there are also paintings on cave walls on the south coast of West Papua on the island of New Guinea. The paintings in these places depict ancestors. The thing that drew attention to the paintings scattered over such a vast area were the silhouettes of the hands everywhere. These handprints are also found in South Sulawesi, on paintings on rock cliffs in the bay of Seram Island, in the Berau Gulf region, Papua, and on the island of Arguni and in the Kai Island. Apart from the hand shadow motif, the motifs found in many places are human figures, boats, sun, moon, birds, fish, turtles, humans, lizards, legs, and hog deer.

== Classical Hindu-Buddhist art ==
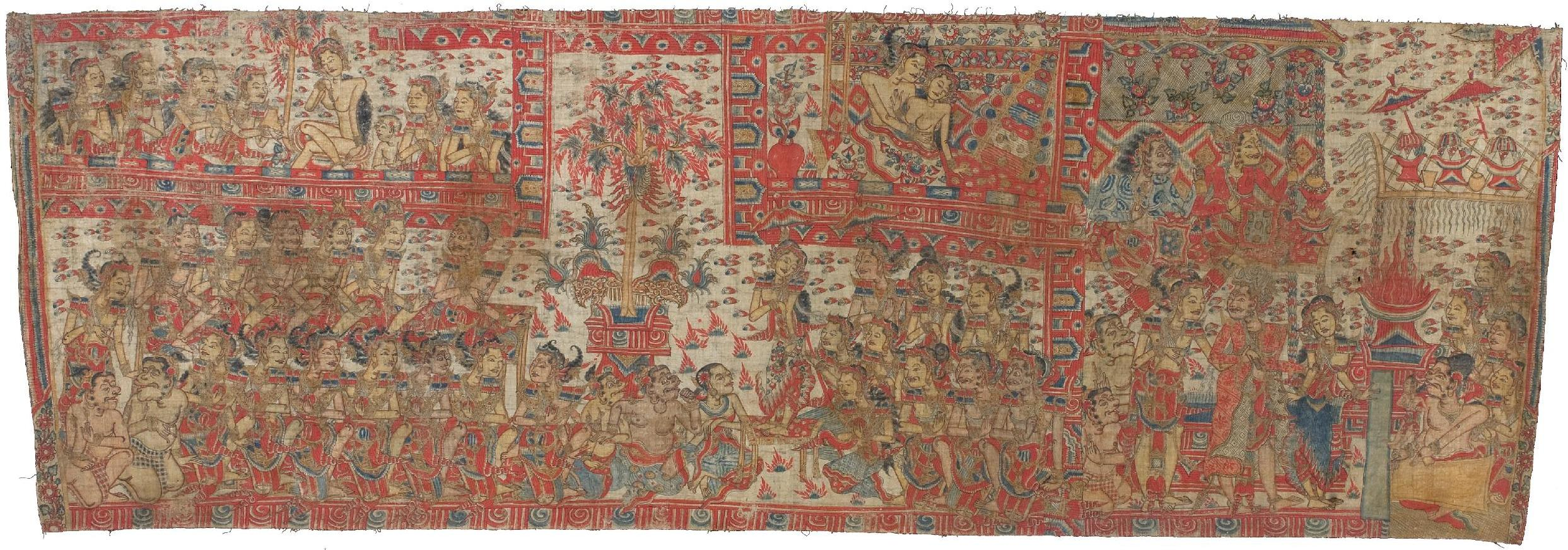
Balinese Painting of Mpu Monaguṇa's Kakawin Sumanasāntaka

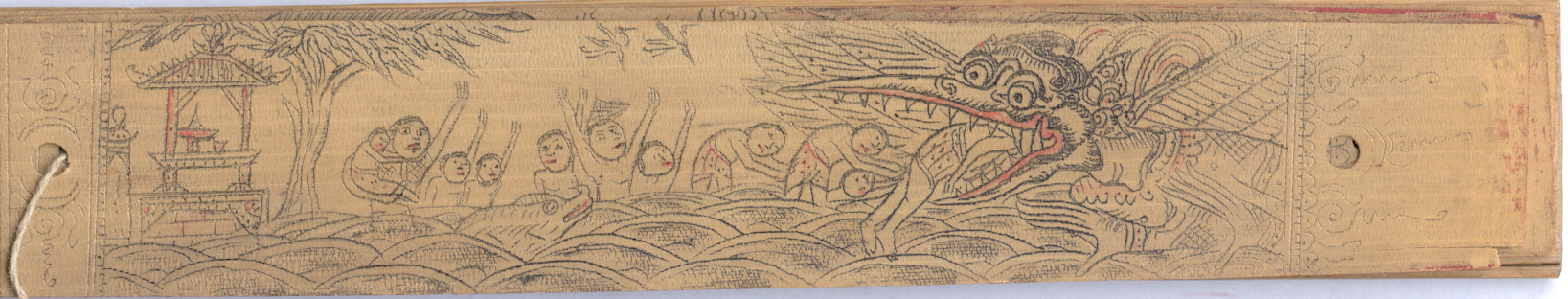
Scene from Adi Parva, illustrated on a palm leaf painting

Kamasan Palindon Painting detail, an example of Kamasan-style classical painting

After the end of prehistoric times, the Indonesian people had various kinds of expertise, such as making large stones in the form of stepped pyramids, metal casting, agriculture and tools, sculpture, and batik making, which were developed with the addition of new elements at the time of the influx of Hindu influence. This period is a new chapter in the periodization of culture in Indonesia. It is a historical era because relics have been found in the form of writing from this time. This happened because of cultural contact with India around the 5th century AD.

Common themes used in works of art at this time include religion, mythology, legends, and historical stories. For example, a classical Balinese painting containing the Ramayana and Mahabharata stories. The style used in the wall carvings of the Majapahit era is the wayang style with a dense, stylized composition of the horizontal plane. The term wayang style here shows a sign of similarity in the stylized forms of the characters from wayang kulit stories and classical Balinese paintings. Painting color is limited to the colors that can be achieved by natural materials such as bark, leaves, soil, and soot. The painting is made on elongated fabric without being attached to the span frame to resemble a scroll painting. Along with temple wall carvings and lontar pictures, classical Balinese painting is an educational medium following religious teachings or the philosophy of life in the Hindu era.

Painting in Bali began when the Hindu culture of East Java was pressured by Islamic culture. Paintings that blend and acculturate Hindu culture are unique and have been recognized by various countries until now. The development of Hindu-Balinese painting can be described in three parts: Kamasan painting, Pita Maha painting, and Young Artists painting.

== Islamic art ==
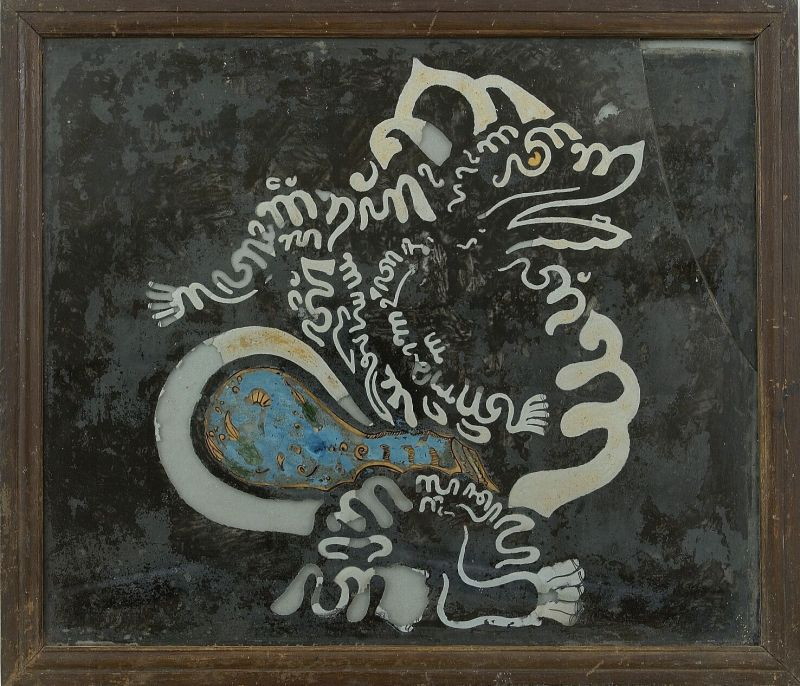
Wayang Semar painting depicted in Javanese Islamic calligraphy

As in the Hindu era, Islamic art in Indonesia is centered in the Kraton or palace. An artist's job is not only to create works of art, but he is also an expert in various sciences and philosophies, in addition to knowing other branches of art. In Islamic art, there is a prohibition against depicting the motives of living things in realistic forms. The artists made efforts to compromise with the previous culture.

In this case, Islamic tolerance supports the continuity of the previous fine art tradition, but with a new breath, such as decoration with stylized animal and human motifs combined with Arabic letters, both in the application of aesthetic elements to mosques, the cultivation of craft art, painting or calligraphy. As for the making of the statues, they are made so disguised that it is as if this image is only a decoration of leaves or flora.

Usually paintings are made as decorations depicting stories of characters in wayang or animal paintings of candra sangkala and about the history of the prophet. The form of painting disguised as a glass painting originating from Cirebon.

== Modern art ==
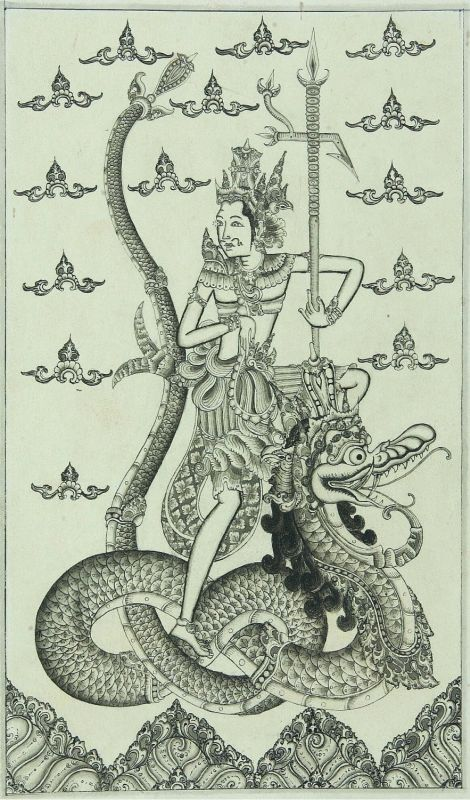
Mahadewa (Indonesian deity) painting depicted on a dragon (snake) wriggling with a stick in his hand. Mahadewa is associated with the highest mountain in Bali, Mount Agung. I. Dewa Gedé Raka Poedja

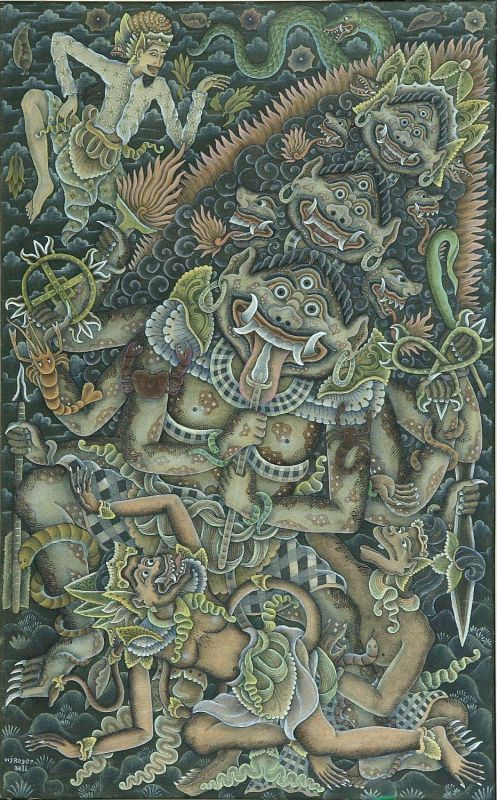
Painting of Vishnu in battle with two monkeys and an acetic figure

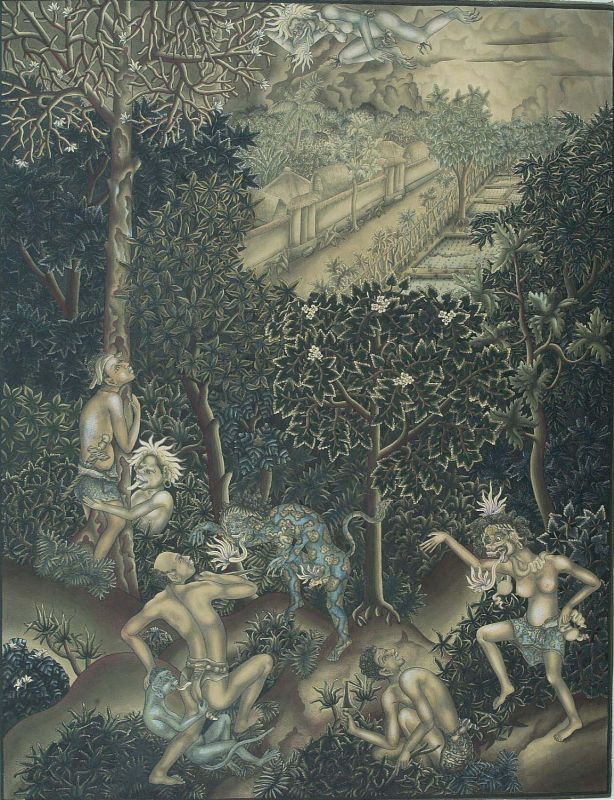
Painting The fight between Balian Batur and Leyak in the cemetery. Gusti Njoman Gdé (1938)

The new Indonesian painting that has developed in Indonesia, like art in general, cannot be fully understood without placing it within the overall framework of Indonesian society and culture. The development of Indonesian painting works was strongly influenced by historical forces. Indonesian painting only developed after the era of Islamic painting. Painting at this time experienced a very rapid development along with the development of Indonesian art in which figures such as Raden Saleh, Affandi, Basuki Abdullah and others.

Indonesian modern painting began with the entry of Dutch colonialism in Indonesia. The trend of Western European art at that time towards romanticism made many Indonesian painters participate in developing this genre.

Raden Saleh Syarif Bustaman is one of the assistants who was lucky enough to learn European-style painting which was practiced by Dutch painters. Raden Saleh then continued to study painting in the Netherlands, so that he became a respected Indonesian painter and became a court painter in several European countries. However, Indonesian painting did not go through the same developments as during the European renaissance, so its development did not go through the same stages. The era of revolution in Indonesia made many Indonesian painters shift from romantic themes to tend toward "populist". Objects related to the natural beauty of Indonesia were considered a theme that betrayed the nation, because they were considered to be a curse on the capitalists who were enemies of the popular ideology of communism at that time. In addition, painting tools such as paints and canvases, which are increasingly difficult to find, have made Indonesian paintings tend to adopt simpler forms, thus giving birth to abstraction.

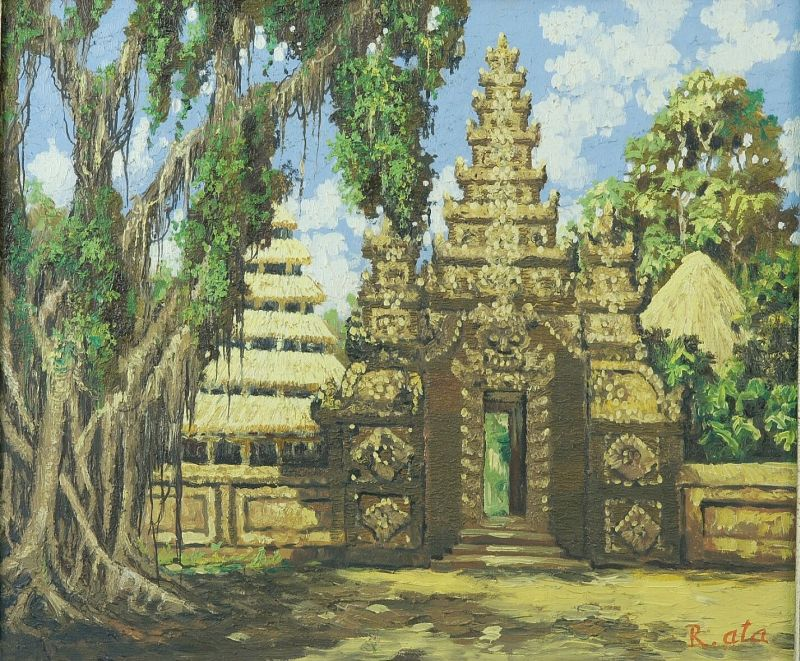
Painting of Balinese temple and banyan tree. Raden Ata

The Cultural Manifesto Movement which aims to fight the coercion of communist ideology made painters in the 1950s prefer to free their works of art from certain political interests, so that the era of expressionism began. Paintings are no longer considered as messengers and propaganda tools. The journey of Indonesian painting from the pioneering work of R. Saleh to the beginning of the twentieth century, is still being swayed by various clashes of conceptions.

The establishment of Indonesian painting which has not yet reached the level of success has been devastated by the idea of modernism which resulted in alternative or contemporary art, with the emergence of conceptual art: "Installation Art" and "Performance Art", which have mushroomed all over the art college around 1993–1996. Then came various alternatives such as "collaboration" as a fashion 1996/1997. Along with that, conventional painting with various styles adorns the galleries, which is no longer a form of appreciation for the community, but an alternative investment business.

The term modern Indonesian art cannot be separated from the artistic tradition in Europe. The contact between Indonesian art and modern art has been going on for a long time and has been deep so that it has directly or indirectly created a cultural relationship or contact.

Modern art in Europe has been proclaimed since the emergence of post-impressionism (early 18th century). At that time, the space for freedom to create works of art was wide open, beginning with the growth of individualistic attitudes in work. The individualistic attitude is getting stronger with the rampant experiments of the artists, both in terms of materials, techniques, and the expression of their art.

The contact between Indonesian collective art and European modern art went through European painters who came to Indonesia. This touch has slowly but surely inspired certain individuals to open a new page in art, namely new art. In this new era of Indonesian art, several developments occurred, such as the following.

=== The Period of Raden Saleh (Pioneer) ===
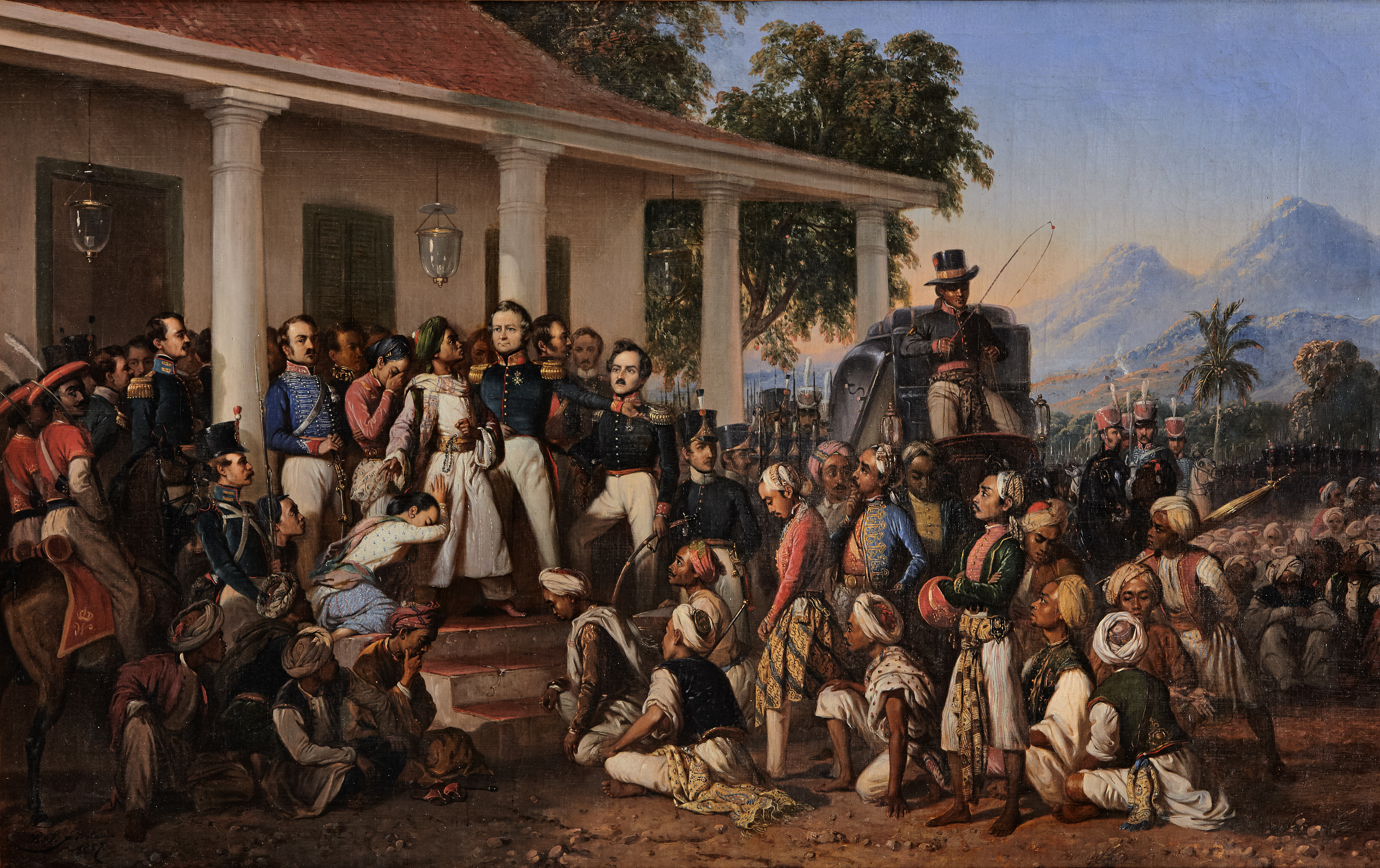
"The Arrest of Pangeran Diponegoro", painted by Raden Saleh, 1857, Merdeka Palace Museum, Jakarta

In the mid-19th century, the world of painting or drawing art of Indonesian artists still referred to the traditional styles that developed in the regions. Most of these works of art hold decorative potential. For example, paintings in Bali and Java, and ornaments in Toraja and Kalimantan.

Some examples of Raden Saleh painting

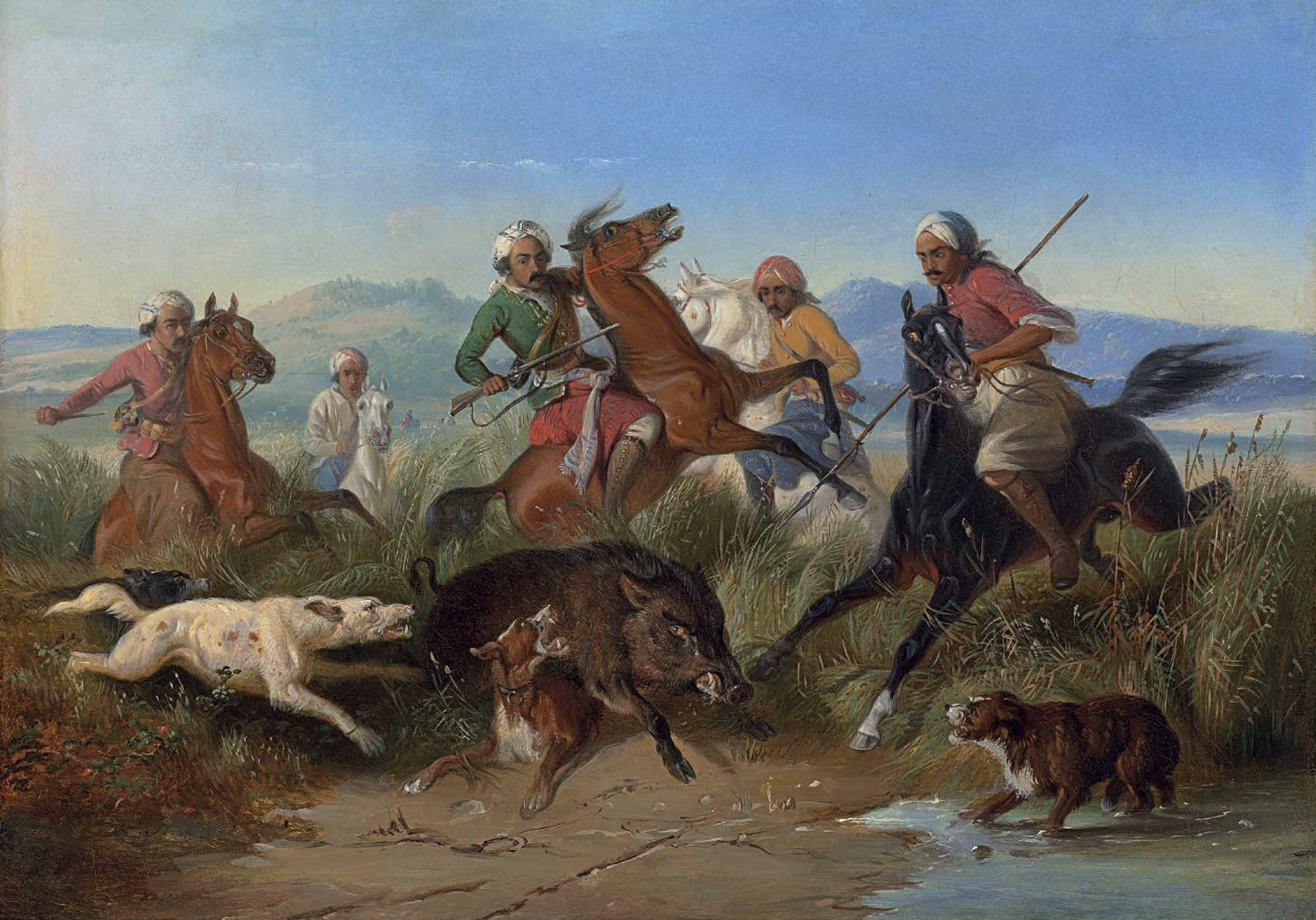
A boar hunt in Java

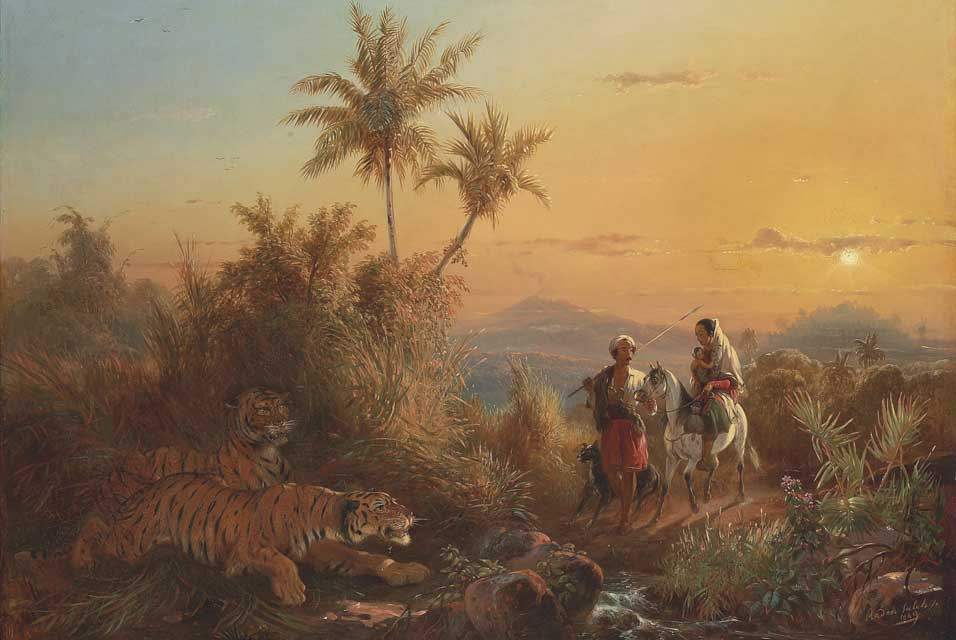
Javanese Landscape, with Tigers Listening to the Sound of a Travelling Group. 1849

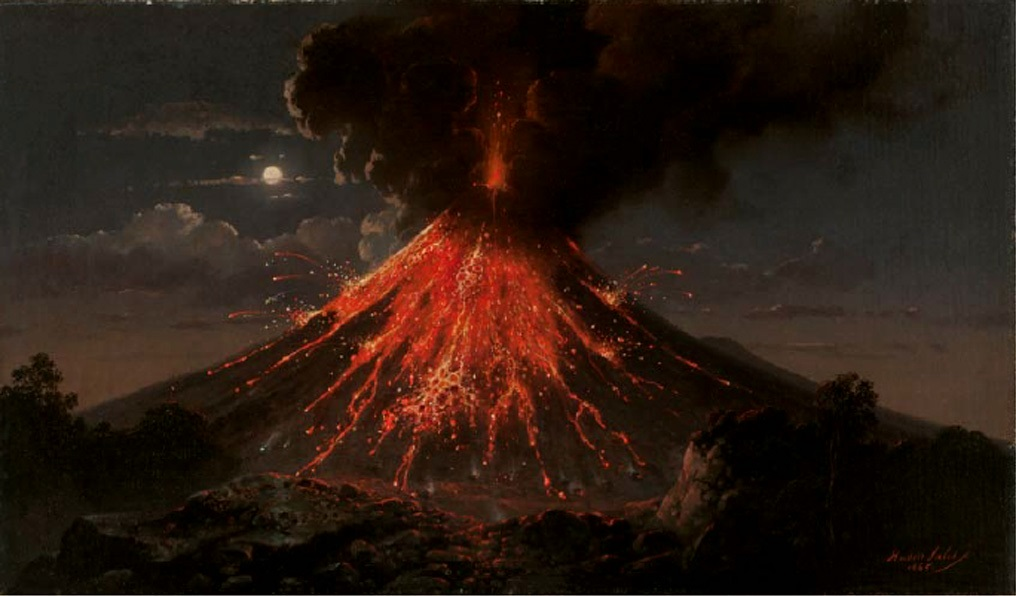
Mount Merapi volcano. 1865

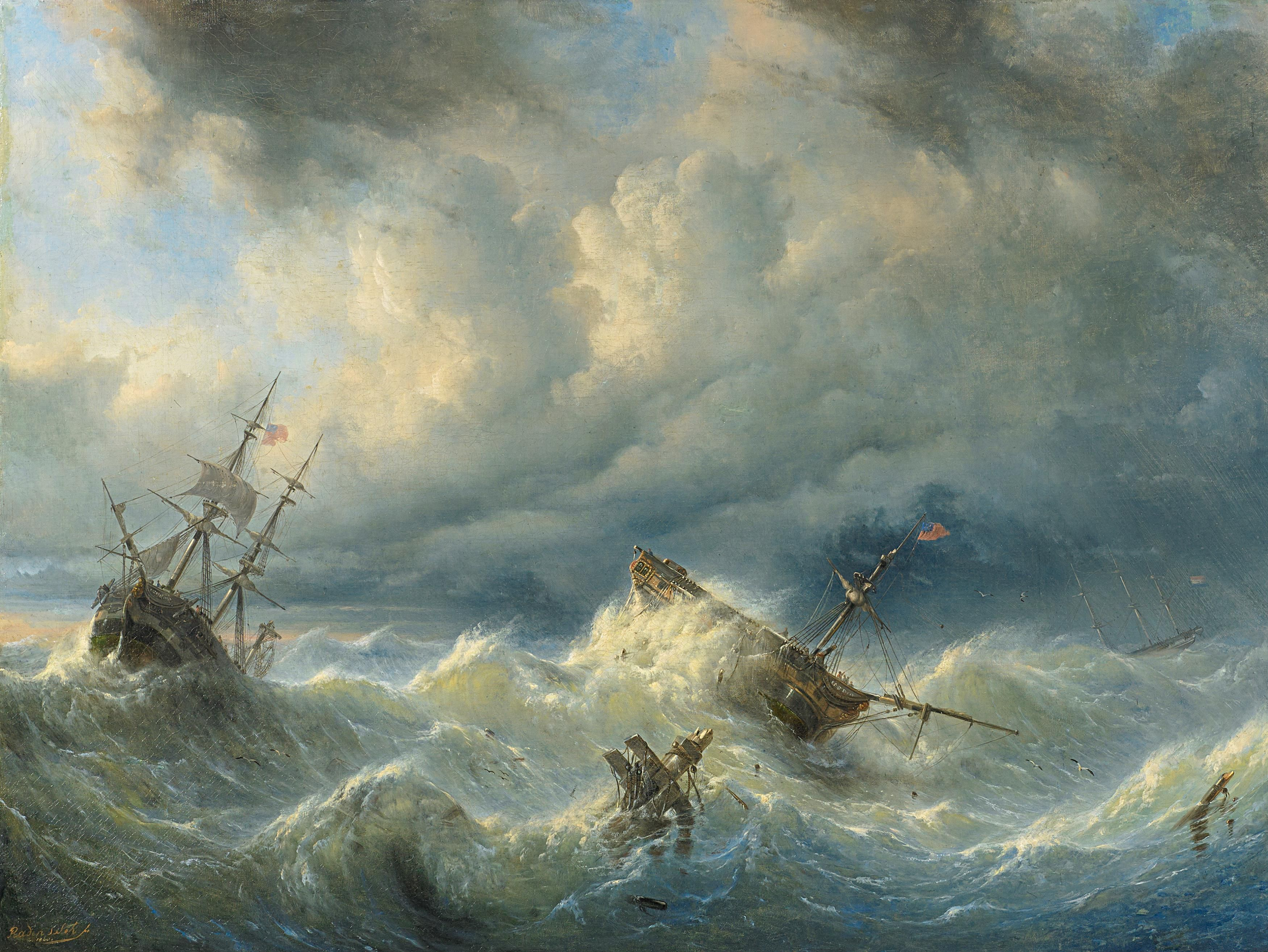
Ships on a Stormy Sea. 1840

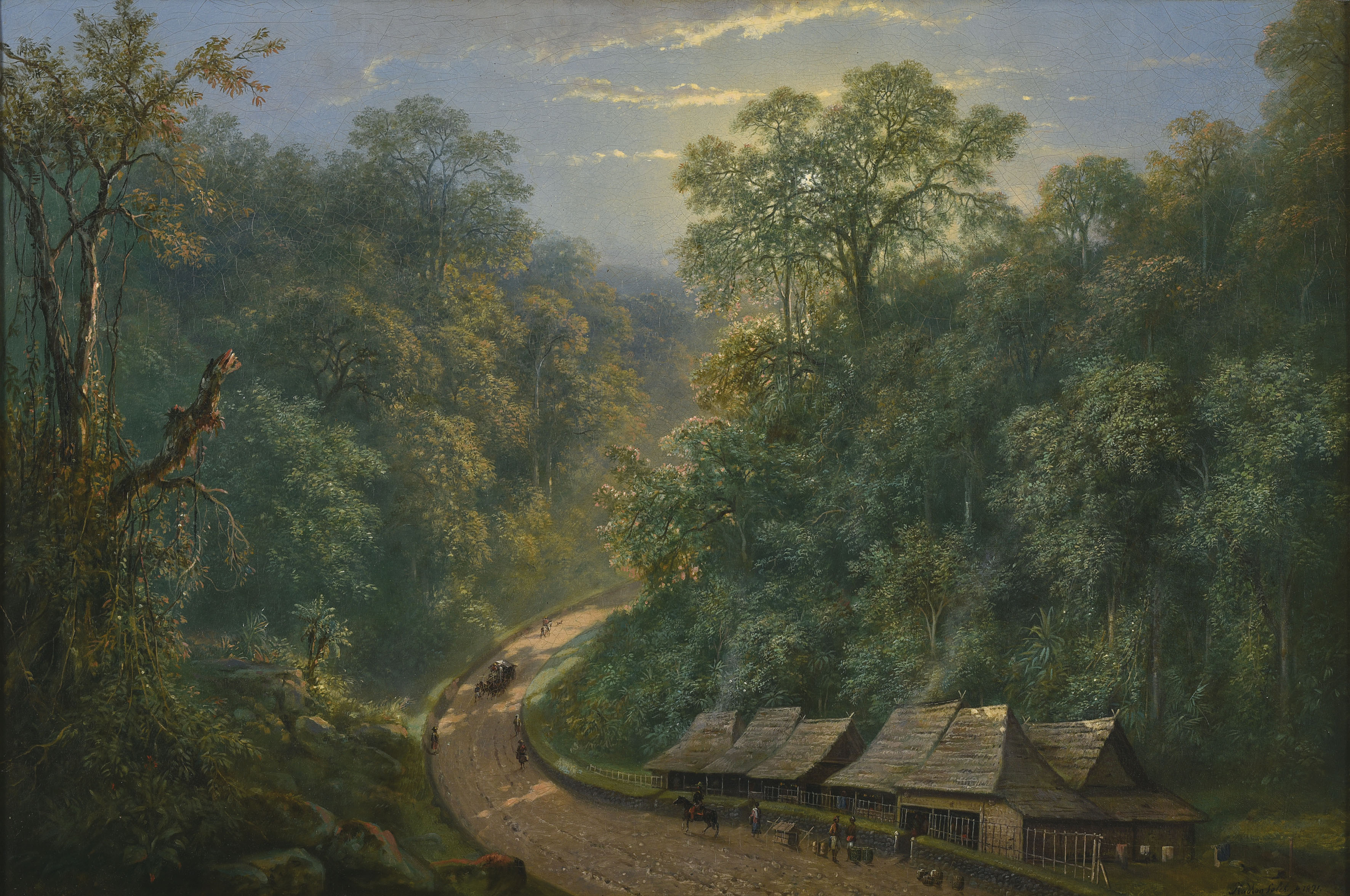
Mail Station at the Bottom of Mount Megamendung. 1871

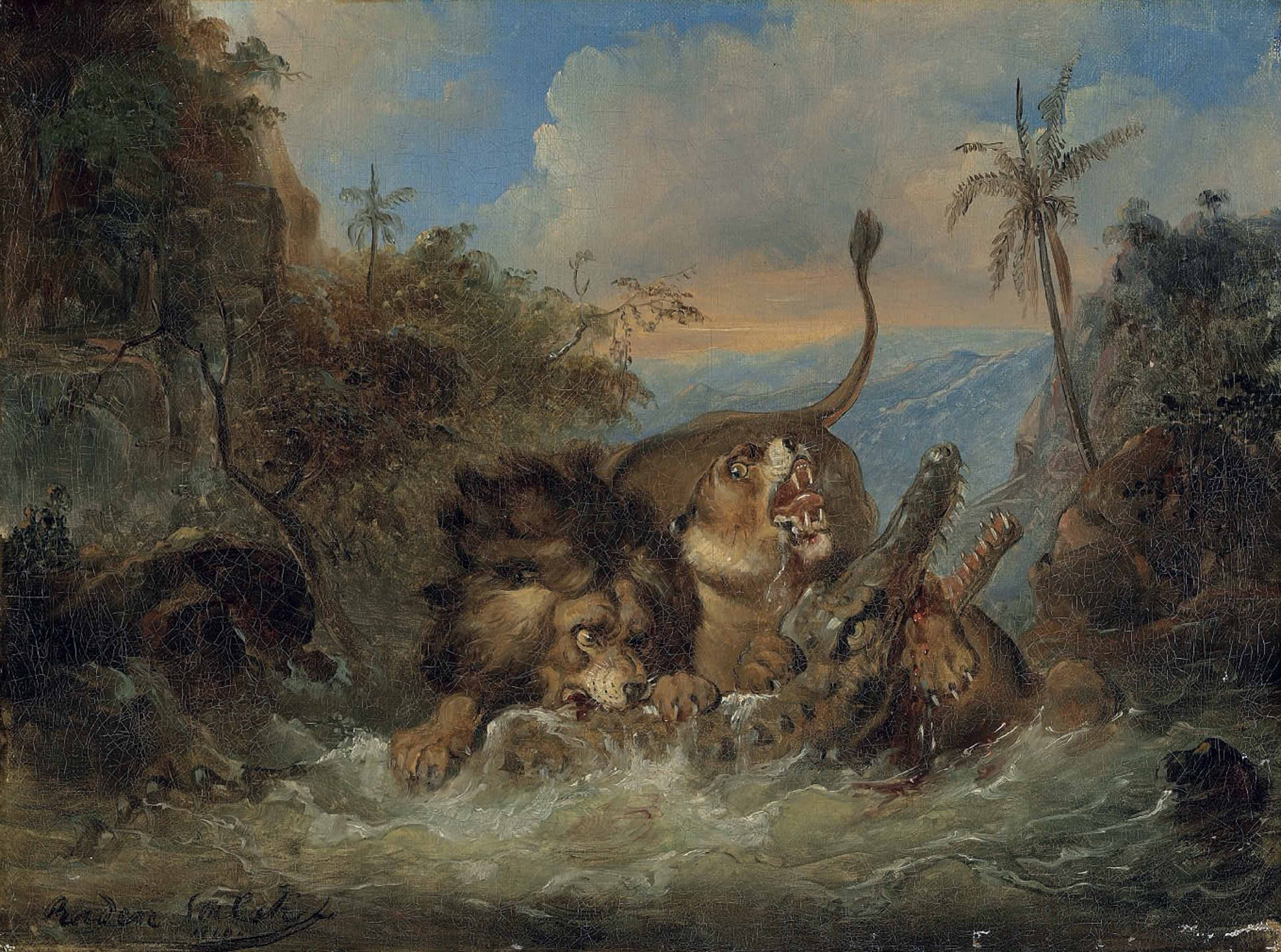
A lion and lioness attacking a crocodile. 1840

=== The Period of Indonesia Jelita (Mooi Indie) ===
Some experts see Raden Saleh Syarif Bustaman (1807-1880) as a pioneer of modern Indonesian painting. This expression is not an exaggeration considering that Raden Saleh was the first Indonesian to receive special painting guidance from naturalist and realist-style painters of Belgian descent who had lived in Indonesia, namely A.A.J. Payen. On Payen's recommendation and supported by C. Reinwart, Raden Saleh had the opportunity to study in Europe. At that time, studying in Europe was still rare for most Indonesians. However, because Raden Saleh was considered to have great talent and was still of noble descent, his departure to Europe could not prevent him. He became the first Indonesian to study fine arts abroad. In Europe, Raden Saleh received guidance from the leading portrait painter, Cornellius Krusemen and natural landscape painter, Andreas Schefhout.

=== Period of Intent - National Ideals ===
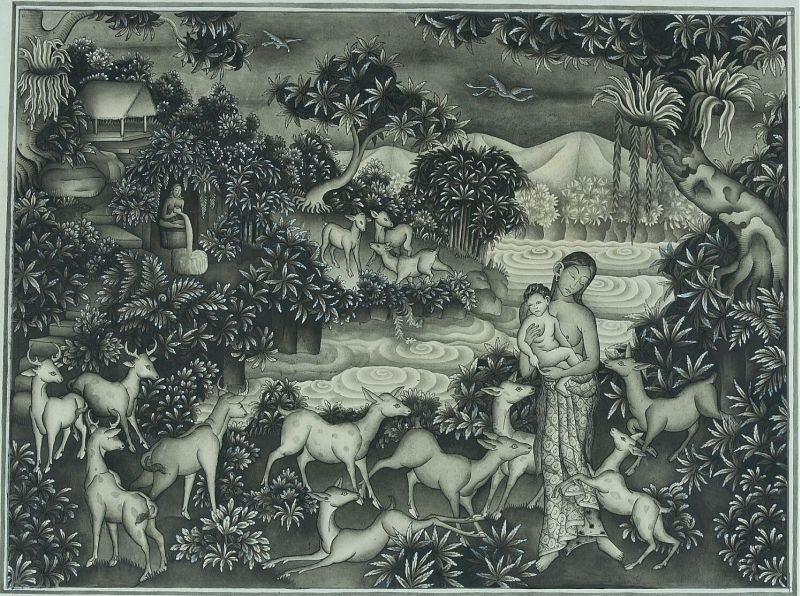
Painting of Indonesian women around the river. Dewa Gedé Raka Toeras (1948)

S. Sudjojono (1913–1986), as the activator of this group, never studied fine arts in Europe at all. The painters who are members of this group include Agus Djaya Suminta, L. Sutioso, Rameli, Abdul Salam, Otto Djaya, S. Sudiarjo, Emiria Sunassa, Saptarita Latif, Herbert Hutagalung, S. Tutur, Hendro Jasmara, and Sutioso.

To strengthen the movement and equalize perceptions, this group then formed the Indonesian Painters Association (PERSAGI) in 1938 in Jakarta. Because their main objective was to build national solidarity among local artists in developing painting with an authentic Indonesian style, they always made sketches of the life style of the people at that time in various places.

After returning from Europe, Abdullah Suriosubroto (1878–1941) lived in Bandung and later developed his own painting style, which became known as Indonesia Jelita (Mooi Indie). This style emphasizes the beauty and atmosphere of the Indonesian nation with its fertile nature and peaceful people. Natural scenery is a very dominant painting object. Anything that is beautiful and romantic is pleasant, serene, and peaceful. The paintings carry only one meaning, namely "Comical Indies" for foreigners and tourists.

In fact, before this style was developed by Abdullah Suriosubroto there were foreign painters who were deliberately invited by the Dutch colonial government to work as custom painters. These painters include W. G. Hofker (Netherlands), R. Locatelli (Italy), Le Mayeur (Netherlands), Roland Strasser (Switzerland), E. Dezentje (Netherlands), and Rudolf Bonnet (Netherlands).

=== Japanese Occupation Period ===
During the Japanese occupation era, to be precise in 1942, PERSAGI was forced to disband. There are an increasing number of artists who are born from the grass root (grassroots), namely the lower class. In 1945, Japan established an institution with the name Japan Keimin Bunka Shidoso (Cultural Center) whose teachers were former members of PERSAGI such as Agus Djaya Suminta and S. Sudjojono. Those who provide the means for artistic activities.

At this time, even though the economic life of the Indonesian people was completely deficient, artistic life seemed to be blazing. The painters also got a breath of fresh air from the Japanese occupation army. Indonesian painters used this fresh air to hold exhibitions. The aim is not only to exhibit the works of local painters, but also to spread a sense of nationality to the wider community. The painters who participated in exhibiting their paintings were Basuki Abdullah, Affandi, Kartono Yudhokusumo, Nyoman Ngedon, Hendra Gunawan, Henk Nantung, and Otto Jaya.

=== Painting Period after Independence ===
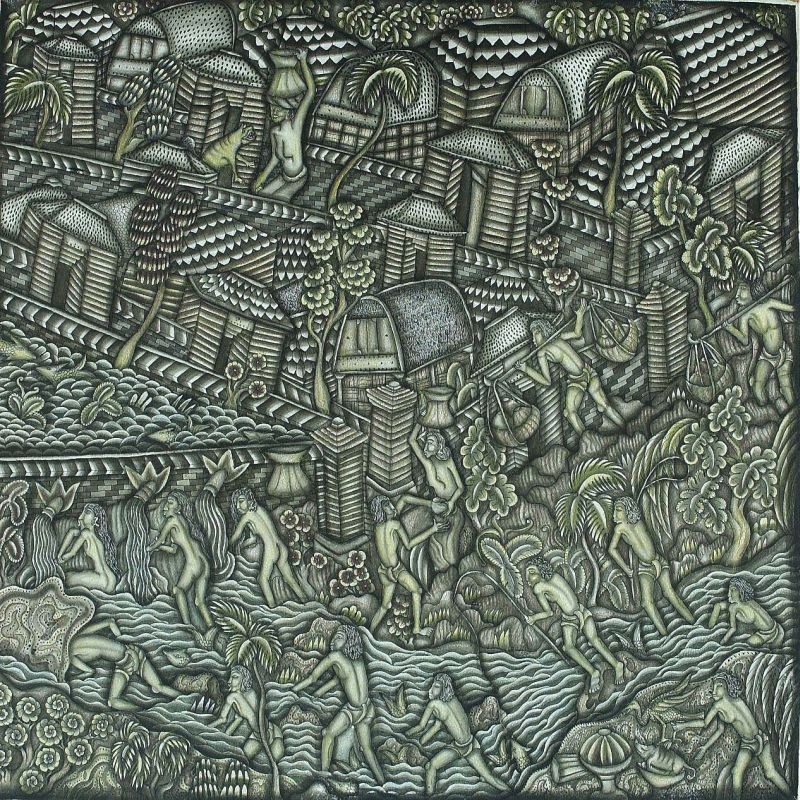
Paintings that depict the life of Indonesian people

In the post-independence period, painting was used as a medium of struggle. The development of painting in Indonesia shows rapid progress because painting has been integrated with the spirit of the nation's independence struggle. This heroic spirit is evidenced in the form of posters of struggles and sketch paintings in the midst of battles. One painter who has done this is Djajengasmoro and his Front Painter group.

The move of the center of government to Yogyakarta in 1946 was followed by the departure of the painters. The city of Yogyakarta has also become a center for painters. In 1946 in Yogyakarta, Affandi, Rusli, Hendra Gunawan, and Harĳadi formed the Community Arts Association. A year later, namely in 1947 they joined the association of Young Indonesian Artists (SIM) which was formed in 1946 in Madiun with the pioneer Sudjojono.

=== The Period of painting during the formal education era ===
In 1949, R. J. Katamsi with several SIM member artists, People's Painters, POETRA, and Budayan Taman Siswa started the Indonesian Fine Arts Academy (ASRI) which has now changed to ISI. The purpose of establishing this academy is to produce aspiring artists. ASRI figures included S. Sudjojono, Hendra Gunawan, Djajengasmoro, Kusnadi, and Sindusiswono. Meanwhile, in Bandung in the 1950s there was also the Center for the Higher Education for Teachers of Pictures, pioneered by Syafe'i Soemardja. He was assisted by Mochtar Apin, Ahmad Sadali, Sudjoko, and Edi Karta Subarna. Since 1959, this institution changed its name to the Fine Arts Department at the Bandung Institute of Technology (ITB).

In 1964, the Department of Fine Arts Education at IKIP Bandung (currently known as the Indonesian Education University) was pioneered by Barli, Karmas, Popo Iskandar, Radiosuto, and Wiyoso Yudoseputo. Some of the alumni of the IKIP Bandung Fine Arts Department who are pursuing painting are artists Oho Garha, Nana Banna, Hidayat, Dadang MA, and Hardiman. Several years later, a fine arts department was opened at other IKIPs throughout Indonesia.

=== The Period of New Painting in Indonesia ===
The development of technology and society that began to advance, around 1974 groups of young artists were born in various regions. Young artists who are members of this movement include Jim Supangkat, Syahrinur Prinka, Satyagraha, F.X. Harsono, Dede Eri Supria, and Munni Ardi. They bring a new style in their work. The first exhibition of their works was held at Taman Ismail Marzuki Jakarta. The works of young artists, most of whom are still in college, are motivated by the following reasons; Dismantling the term artist as an attribute that is only attached to academics, while the small community engaged in the arts do not get a proper place, they challenge the boundaries of art that have long been made by these old artists means avoiding framing, and trying to create something new with various media, work concepts, etc., the creation of this work of art is no exception to art that is applied to things that are considered sacred.

== Gallery ==
Some examples of Indonesian painting

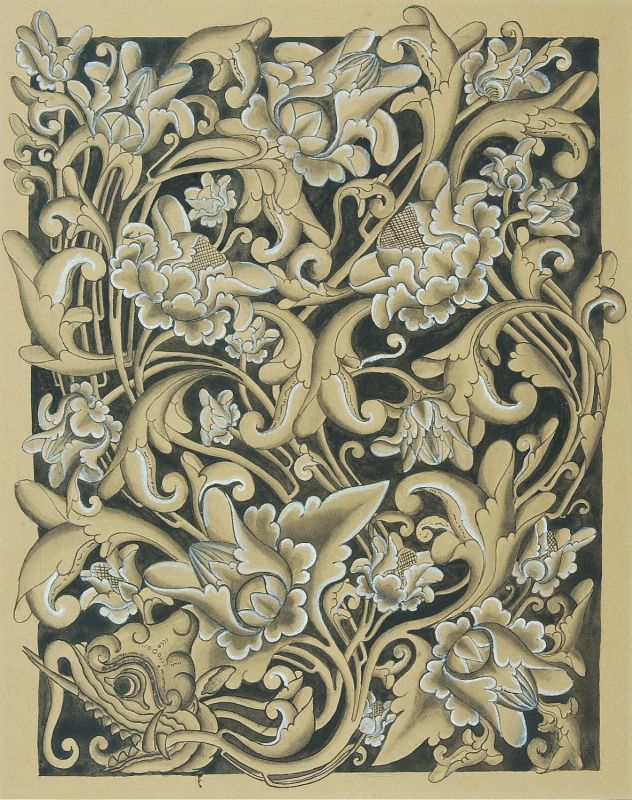
Painting patra Olanda's ornament, A Balinese ornament. I.Goesti Agoeng Raka

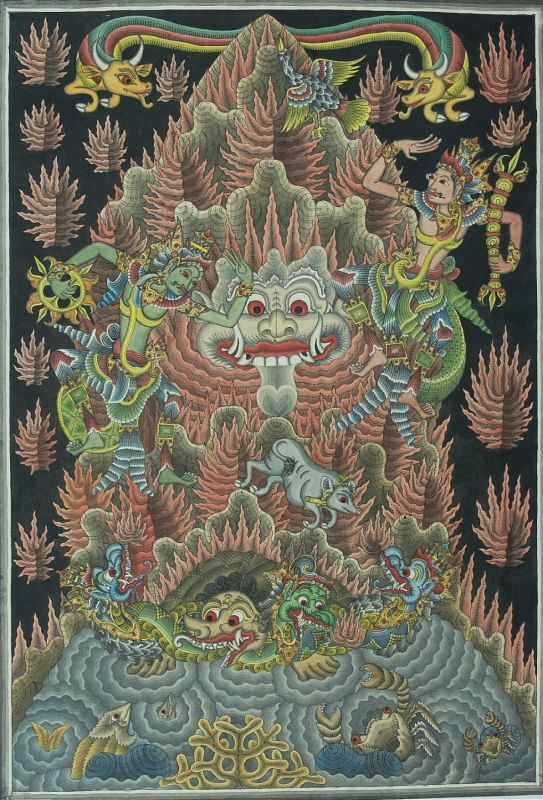
Linga Bawa Shiva's painting is based on the symbolism of the linga and yoni. I. Goesti Molog

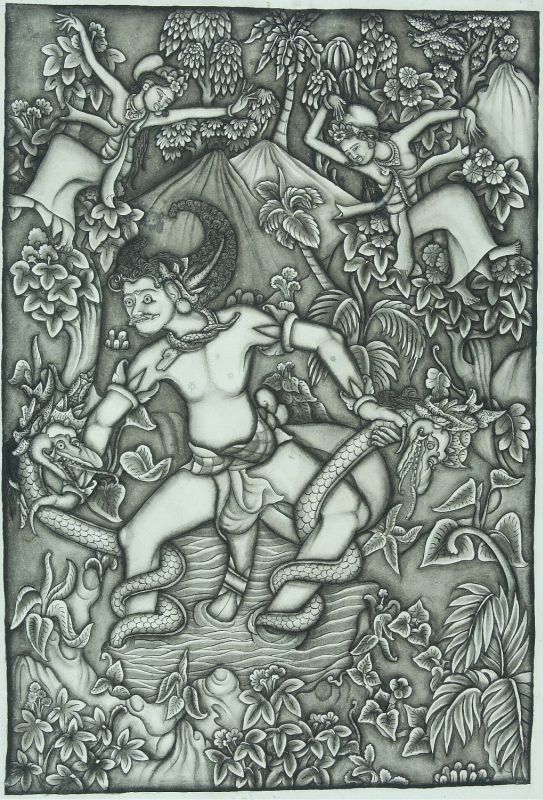
Paintings from the story of the Mahabharata. Drona tried to get rid of Bhima by telling him to meditate on Mount Kailasa

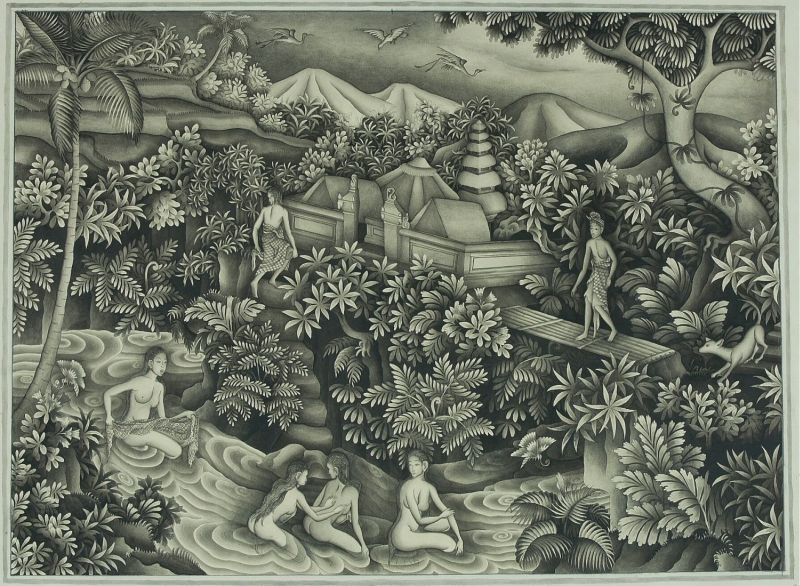
Painting of a woman bathing in a river while a man watches from the side, with a temple in the background

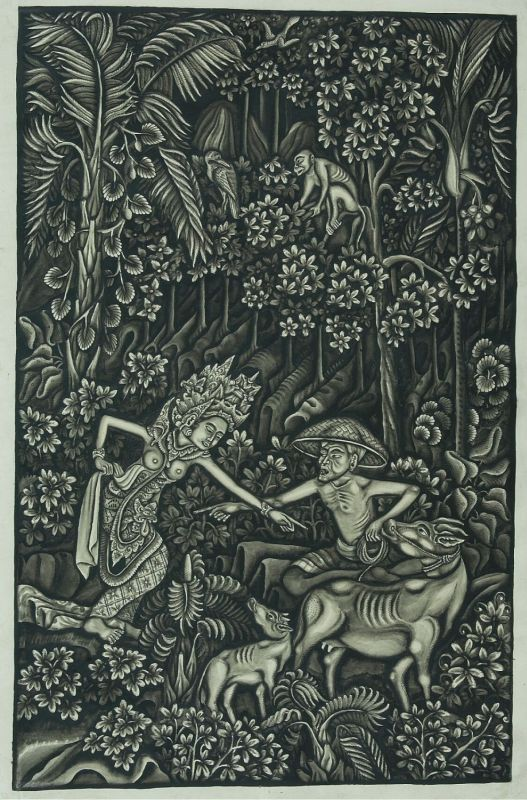
A painting taken from a traditional story, a heavenly nymph meeting a skinny farmer and a skinny carabao

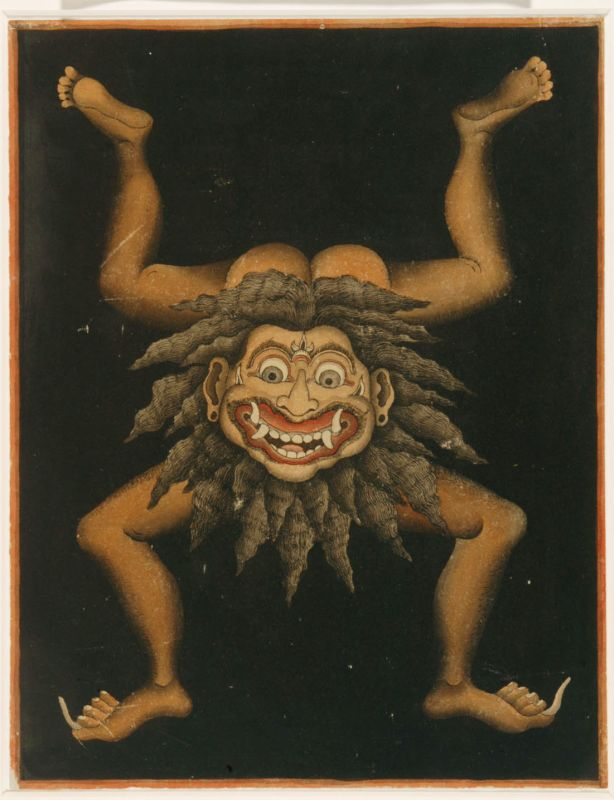
The artistic painting "upside down devil" is traditionally depicted as a monster standing on his hands, hanging on the door of a house to protect its inhabitants from evil influences. I. Dewa Gedé Soberat

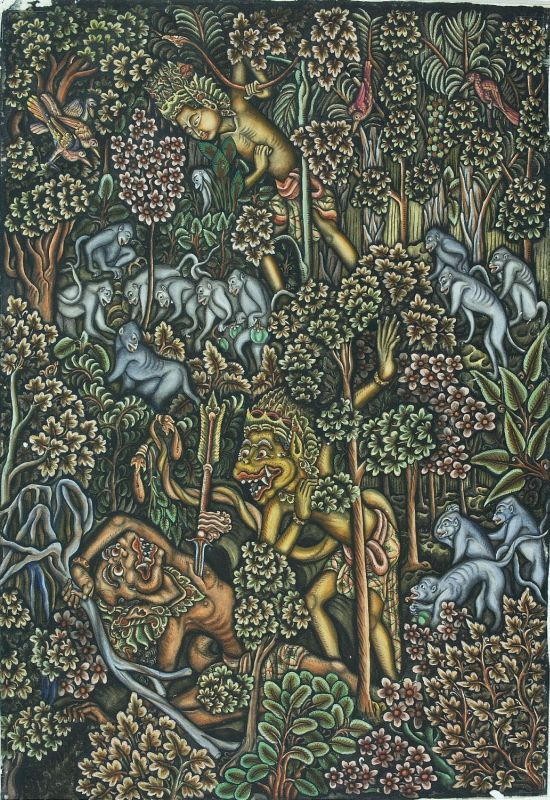
Painting from the Ramayana story, where the king Sugriva kills his opponent Subali. Ida Bagoes Togog

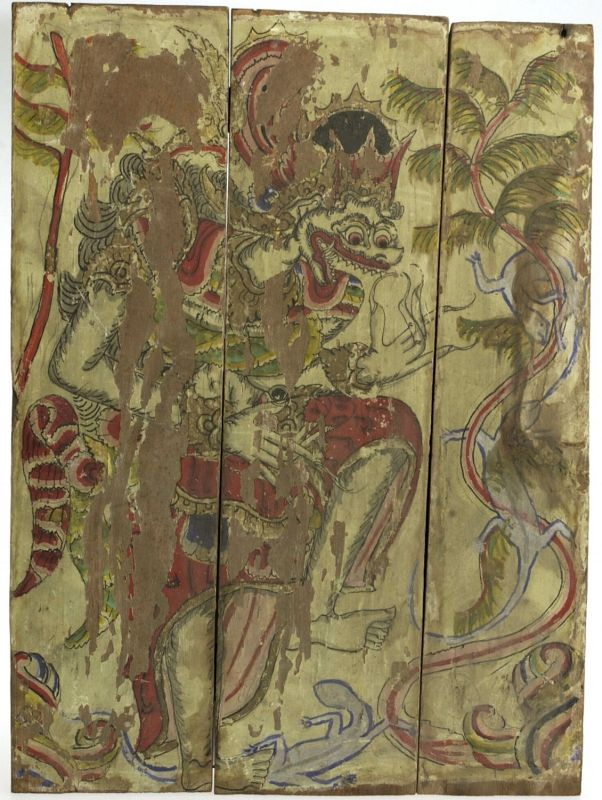
Paintings depicting evil spirits in Indonesian mythology

== See also ==
- Indonesian art
- Culture of Indonesia
