= Djaya =

Djaya is a surname. Notable people with the surname include:

- Agus Djaya, Indonesian painter
- Otto Djaya, Indonesian painter, brother of Agus
