= Routledge Encyclopedia of Philosophy =

1998 philosophy text edited by Edward Craig

The Routledge Encyclopedia of Philosophy is an encyclopedia of philosophy edited by Edward Craig that was first published by Routledge in 1998. Originally published in both 10 volumes of print and as a CD-ROM, in 2002 it was made available online on a subscription basis. The online version is regularly updated with new articles and revisions to existing articles. It has 1,300 contributors providing over 2,000 scholarly articles.

== Single-volume editions ==
Two single-volume editions of the encyclopedia have been published, The Concise Routledge Encyclopedia of Philosophy, first published in 1999 (ISBN 978-0415223645), and The Shorter Routledge Encyclopedia of Philosophy, first published in 2005 (ISBN 978-0415324953). The Concise version has the same number of entries as the ten-volume set, each entry in the Concise version being the summary of the topic that precedes each article in the 10-volume work. The Shorter version has over 900 articles, each with more in depth coverage than the corresponding entry (if present) in the Concise encyclopedia.

== See also ==
- Encyclopedia of Philosophy
- Stanford Encyclopedia of Philosophy
- Routledge Encyclopedia of Modernism
- List of online encyclopedias
