= Indonesian Painters Association =

Artist collective active in Batavia, Dutch East Indies

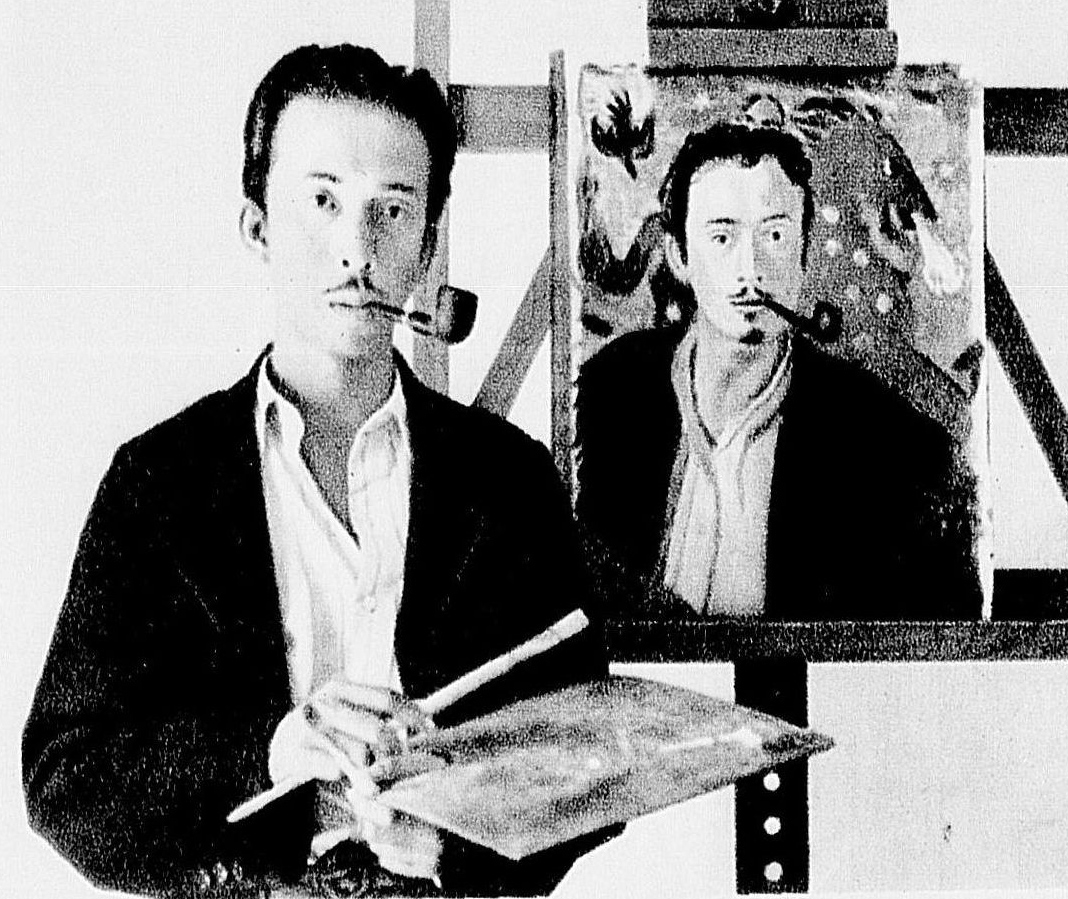
S. Sudjojono

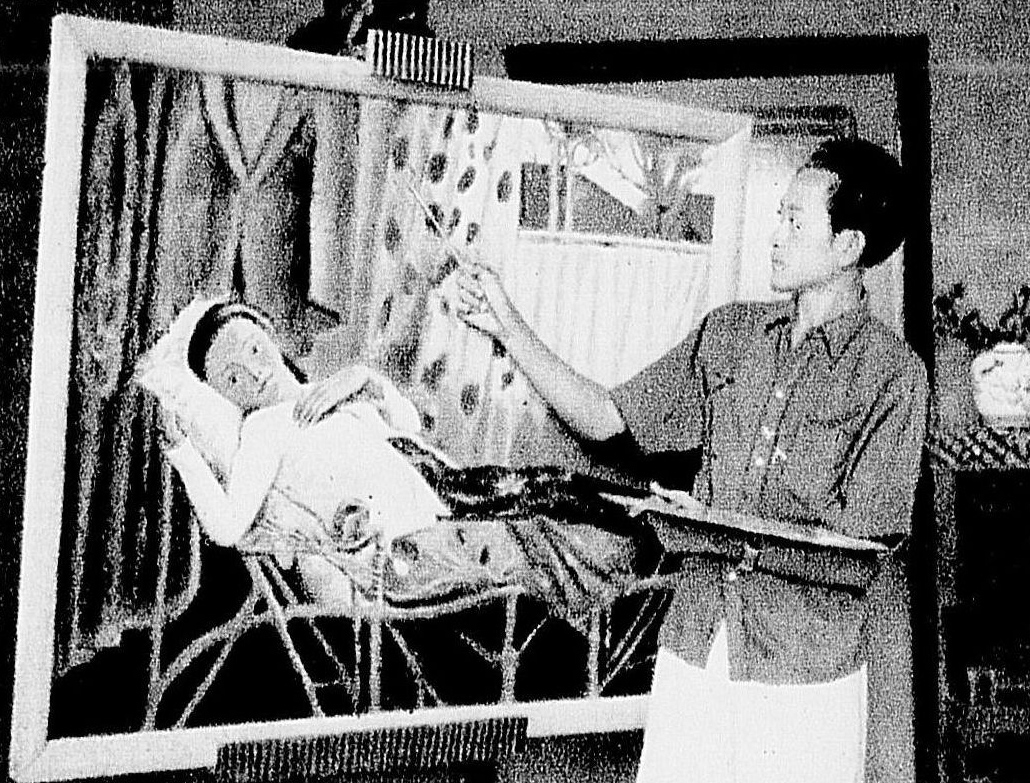
Agus Djaya

The founders of the Indonesian Painters Association

The Indonesian Painters Association (Indonesian: Persatuan Ahli Gambar Indonesia (Note: Also rendered the Persatuan Ahli-Ahli Gambar Indonesia. Other translations include Union of Indonesian Painters (Sambrani 2016), Union of Indonesian Drawers (Sambrani 2016), Association of Indonesian Artists (Raben 2009, p. 84), Union of Picture Experts (Holt 1967, p. 197), and Indonesian Drawing Masters Association (Lisa 2015, p. 40).)), often known by its Indonesian acronym PERSAGI, was an artist collective active in Batavia, Dutch East Indies (now Jakarta, Indonesia) between 1938 and 1942. Established by S. Sudjojono and Agus Djaya as criticism of the "Beautiful Indies" (Mooi Indië) style of painting, the collective was distinguished not by a single style but rather a shared desire to create a modern Indonesian art style that allowed artists to express themselves. The collective held two joint exhibitions, at the Kolff bookstore in 1940 and at the Kuntskring in May 1941. It was dissolved in 1942, during the Japanese occupation of the Dutch East Indies. Aside from Sudjojono and Agus Djaya, members included Emiria Sunassa, Otto Djaya, and Basuki Resobowo.

== History ==
In the Dutch East Indies (now Indonesia), numerous European artists travelled the archipelago through the 19th century. Indigenous artists learned from these painters and adapted their romanticism, led by Raden Saleh and followed by men such as Abdullah Suriosubroto, Pirngadi, and Wakidi. This style of art remained dominant among indigenous artists through the 1920s, and was marked by "clean" colour combinations and a neat division between front, middle, and back spaces. In the late 1930s, several indigenous Indonesian painters began to criticize the earlier style. S. Sudjojono decried the genre as the "Beautiful Indies" (Mooi Indië) style, based around a "holy trinity" of mountains, coconut palms, and rice fields.

Against this background, a new artist collective was established by Sudjojono in conjunction with Agus Djaya on 23 October 1938. (Note: Some earlier sources, such as Holt (1967, p. 197) and Yuliman (2023, p. 115), write that the organization was active as early as 1937.) Named the Indonesian Painters Association (Persatuan Ahli Gambar Indonesia, or PERSAGI), it held its first meeting at an elementary school in Harmoni, a district of the capital Batavia (now Jakarta). The collective was headed by Agus Djaya, with Sudjojono fulfilling the role of secretary. Noted for his writing abilities, Sudjojono was frequently perceived as the group's spokesperson, though he was reportedly uncomfortable with this label.

Often identified as the first modern art movement in the Indies, (Note: The Group of Five in Bandung, which included Affandi, was active earlier. However, it gained less prominence in part due to its lack of a spokesperson (Masahiro 2017, pp. 133–134).) PERSAGI was intended not only to challenge the earlier "Beautiful Indies" style but also to create a new, national art. During meetings, which were held rarely, members would discuss articles on art published in such magazines as The Studio and Elsevier's Geïllustreerd Maandschrift. Some would deliver lectures on modern art figures, with Sudjojono discussing the works of Vincent van Gogh, Paul Cezanne, and Marc Chagall with other members. Often, members would host lessons in their own homes.

At its peak, PERSAGI consisted of some twenty or thirty members. Several members, including Sudjojono, had been educated at schools run by Taman Siswa. Others had worked on advertising materials, including posters installed in the capital. Formal art education was sparse in the Indies, and those who had received an education in the field had generally apprenticed to established artists. Interpersonal relationships between members do not appear to have been particularly close, and the Dutch art historian Remco Raben describes them as united by "their dilettantism, their urge to develop an individual style of painting, and their marginal position in the art world of the time".

The collective held several exhibitions, with its inaugural event held at the Kolff bookstore in Batavia in 1940 with funds raised by the artists themselves. Sudjojono later wrote that it had been unsuccessful, considering the members to have remained too heavily inspired by European works: "Because we still follow the style of others [...] our original indigenous way of painting is inhibited; it is rusted and cannot come forth." A second exhibition of works by Persagi members was held by the Kuntskring in May 1941, at the urging of local Dutch artists; it consisted of approximately sixty works by a dozen painters. Little is known about the works displayed at these exhibitions.

After the Japanese occupation of the Dutch East Indies in 1942, PERSAGI was disbanded along with numerous other organizations. Many of its artists, including Sudjojono and Agus Djaya, went on the join the Keimin Bunka Shidōsho (Institute for People's Education and Cultural Guidance), established by the Japanese occupation government. This institution provided them with greater access to resources, as well as official recognition, and by the end of the occupation in 1945 the number of Indonesian painters had increased drastically.

== Art ==
Artists in PERSAGI had no shared style, except for a general tendency towards realism. Sudjojono employed socialist realism, drawing from expressionism, in his works. Emiria Sunassa, one of the collective's few women artists, (Note: The others were Saptarita Latif and Trijoto Abdullah (Dirgantoro 2017, p. 80).) was a primitivist who experimented with cubism and impressionism, and Agus Djaya combined fauvism with expressionism. Likewise, artists under PERSAGI drew from diverse inspirations. Agus Daja and his brother Otto looked to art they considered "untainted" by western teachings, including temple reliefs and children's drawings. Emiria drew on her experiences travelling the archipelago's eastern islands. Subject matter similarly differed; though street scenes and portraits were common, members also painted scenes from mythology (Agus Djaya) and nudes (Emiria Sunassa).

Rather, PERSAGI members were united by a shared paradigm. Describing it, the artist Suromo Darpo Sawego wrote, "What is necessary is that the heart's contents are let free. Let free how, using whose method, it's unimportant. Art is not a question of technical skills or painting skills, but the voice of a heart held back by repression." (Note: Original: "Yang perlu isi hati keluar semua. Keluar dengan cara apa dan cara siapa, tidak penting. Pekerjaan seni bukan kepandaian teknik bukan kepandaiannya melukis, tapi kata hati yang padat karena banyak menahan".) Similarly, Sudjojono argued that "painting is the soul made visible", with the work of art "the artist's visible soul", or jiwa ketok.

Members of PERSAGI tended to have a socialist-nationalist perspective. The use of the term "Indonesia" in their name was part of a nationalist message that had been codified in the Youth Pledge of 1928 as "one motherland, one people, one language". The collective viewed the existing art culture of the Indies as "seem[ing] to cater only to the Dutch", and thereby limiting indigenous artists from gaining recognition. Instead, they sought to create art with "the stamp of a new unified Indonesia". Responding to the Dutch critic J. Hopman, Sudjojono wrote in the 1940s, "About the future of Indonesian art, we as Indonesians are quite capable of deciding for ourselves. Since the Dutch colonial era, in the era of PERSAGI, we already know where we will be taking our Indonesian art."

At the same time, PERSAGI artists viewed the West as the source of modernity. Consequently, the development of a modern Indonesian art required knowledge of art techniques developed in Europe. Sudjojono wrote that Indonesian artists would have to "turn to the West in order to go East", studying the philosophy of art promoted by colonial forces while also opening their eyes "to the spirit and styles of the country's different regional arts".

== Notable members ==
- Agus Djaya
- Basuki Resobowo
- Emiria Sunassa
- Otto Djaya
- S. Sudjojono
- Suromo Darpo Sawego
- Trijoto Abdullah

== Works cited ==
- Bodden, Michael (October 2018). "Lekra Woodcuts in the Early 1960s: Socialist Realism, National Culture, and Cosmopolitan Patriots". Indonesia. 106 (106): 1–33. doi:10.1353/ind.2018.0013. ProQuest 2187099337 – via ProQuest.
- Cox, Matt (2016). "Djaya, Agus (1913–1994)". Routledge Encyclopedia of Modernism. doi:10.4324/9781135000356-REM416-1. ISBN 978-1-135-00035-6.
- "De Bataviasche Kunstkring Schilderijententoonstelling" [The Batavia Art Circle Exhibition]. Bataviaasch Nieuwsblad (in Dutch). Batavia. 7 May 1941. p. 3.
- Dirgantoro, Wulan (2017). Feminisms and Contemporary Art in Indonesia: Defining Experiences. Amsterdam: Amsterdam University Press. pp. 77–118. doi:10.1017/9789048526994. ISBN 978-90-485-2699-4.
- Dirgantoro, Wulan (March 2019). "Interrogating the Feminine in Indonesian Modern and Contemporary Art". Southeast of Now: Directions in Contemporary and Modern Art in Asia. 3 (1): 77–118. doi:10.1353/sen.2019.0005. hdl:11343/355559.
- Hafiz, Syed Muhammad (2015). "Manifesting the Nation: Realities and Realisms". Between Declarations and Dreams: Art of Southeast Asia Since the 19th Century. National Gallery Singapore. pp. 56–63. doi:10.2307/j.ctvgc6016.8. ISBN 978-981-09-7349-0. JSTOR j.ctvgc6016.8.
- Holt, Claire (1967). Art in Indonesia: Continuities and Change. Ithaca, New York: Cornell University Press. ISBN 978-0-8014-0188-6.
- Kent, Elly; Hooker, Virginia; Turner, Caroline (2023). "Introduction". In Kent, Elly; Hooker, Virginia; Turner, Caroline (eds.). Living Art: Indonesian Artists Engage Politics, Society and History. Asian Studies. Vol. 17. Canberra: ANU Press. pp. 1–31. ISBN 978-1-76046-493-6.
- Lisa, Horikawa (2015). "Imagining Country and Self". Between Declarations and Dreams: Art of Southeast Asia Since the 19th Century. National Gallery Singapore. pp. 32–43. doi:10.2307/j.ctvgc6016.6. ISBN 978-981-09-7349-0. JSTOR j.ctvgc6016.6.
- Masahiro, Ushiroshoji (2017). "The Birth of 'Fine Art' in Southeast Asia, 1900–1945". In Low, Sze Wee; Flores, Patrick D. (eds.). Charting Thoughts: Essays on Art in Southeast Asia. National Gallery Singapore. pp. 130–139. doi:10.2307/j.ctv13xpr6k.13. ISBN 978-981-11-2865-3. JSTOR j.ctv13xpr6k.13.
- Purnomo, Setianingsih (2014). "Seni Rupa Masa Kolonial: Mooi Indie vs. PERSAGI". Ultimart: Jurnal Komunikasi Visual. 5 (1): 7–17. doi:10.31937/ultimart.v7i2.391.
- Raben, Remco (2009). "In Search of Freedom". In Knol, Meta; Raben, Remco; Zijlmans, Kitty (eds.). Beyond the Dutch: Indonesia, the Netherlands, and the Visual Arts, from 1900 until Now. Leiden: KIT Publishers. pp. 83–92. ISBN 978-94-6022-059-3.
- Sambrani, Chaitanya (2016). "PERSAGI (Persatuan Ahli-Ahli Gambar Indonesia)". Routledge Encyclopedia of Modernism. doi:10.4324/9781135000356-REM895-1. ISBN 978-1-135-00035-6.
- "Schilderijen-tentoonstelling" [Painting Exhibition]. Soerabaijasch Handelsblad (in Dutch). Surabaya. 26 June 1941. p. 2.
- Yuliman, Sanento (2023) [1977]. "New Indonesian Painting". In Kent, Elly; Hooker, Virginia; Turner, Caroline (eds.). Living Art: Indonesian Artists Engage Politics, Society and History. Asian Studies. Vol. 17. Translated by Kent, Elly. Canberra: ANU Press. pp. 109–144. ISBN 978-1-76046-493-6.
