= Trijoto Abdullah =

Indonesian sculptor (died 1989)

- Trijoto in her studio, undated
- Born: 1910s (Note: Sources disagree as to her year of birth. Orang Indonesia jang Terkemoeka di Djawa (1944, p. 428) gives 10 December 1916, Hardini (2024, p. 2) and Lusandiana & Amalia (2021, p. 8) give 1917, and Sanjaya (2025) gives 1919.); Surakarta, Central Java, Dutch East Indies
- Died: 8 January 1989; Sleman, Yogyakarta, Indonesia

Tridjoto Abdullah (Enhanced Spelling: Trijoto Abdullah, 1910s – 8 January 1989) was an Indonesian sculptor. The daughter of the painter Abdullah Suriosubroto, Trijoto entered the arts as a model in 1933. She took up sculpture that year, studying under the architect Charles Prosper Wolff Schoemaker and the doctor Max Ulrich Thierfelder. She held her only exhibition in 1939, alongside her brother Basuki. She sculpted through the 1950s, working mostly on commissions with nationalist themes, but changed media after sculpting aggravated her asthma. Trijoto has been identified as Indonesia's first female sculptor as well as its first professional sculptor, but has received little academic attention. Her sole surviving sculpture is Monumen Banteng Ketaton (the Ketaton Bull Monument) in Madiun.

== Biography ==
=== Early life ===
Trijoto was born in Surakarta, Central Java, Dutch East Indies (now Indonesia), in the 1910s. She was the fourth child of Abdullah Suriosubroto, an artist identified with the Mooi Indië ("beautiful Indies") genre, and his wife Raden Ayu Ngadisah. Her adoptive grandfather, Wahidin Soedirohoesodo, was a nobleman who had co-established the Budi Utomo movement. This background provided Trijoto with educational opportunities—she received her primary education at a Dutch-run school for indigenous children—as well as an introduction to the arts.

Trijoto was living in Bandung in the 1930s. In 1933, her elder brother Basuki invited her to attend one of his art exhibitions as a model. Through Basuki and his colleague Raden Mas Sosrokartono, she met the architect Charles Prosper Wolff Schoemaker and the doctor Max Ulrich Thierfelder. These men taught her sculpting techniques and human anatomy, and she began to produce sculptures for them. Later that year, she married Ki Tjokrosoeharto, a teacher with a local Taman Siswa school. The couple had five children.

=== Sculpting career ===
By 1938 Trijoto was earning a living as a sculptor, though she also spent time painting. She joined the Indonesian Painters Association, one of its few female members. (Note: The group had only three women as members: Trijoto, Emiria Sunassa, and Saptarita Latief (Dirgantoro 2017, p. 80) .) In May 1939, she held a joint exhibition with Basuki at the Societeit Concordia in Bandung, contributing three busts of women; this was her only exhibition in her lifetime. She also wrote in the mass media, with an article in the magazine Keboedajaan dan Masjarakat likening art and culture to a family: full of differences, yet united in a shared desire for advancement.

During the Indonesian National Revolution, Trijoto was living in Madiun, East Java. In 1947, she erected Monumen Banteng Ketaton (the Ketaton Bull Monument) in the city. Featuring a bull alongside a man wielding a sharpened bamboo spear, the statue was intended to commemorate popular resistance to Dutch colonial rule during Operation Product. She was reported to have sold her children's jewellery to help fund the revolution. She also created busts of national figures such as Kartini and Soetomo.

=== Later life ===
Ki Tjokrosoeharto died in 1952. To support her family, Trijoto moved to Jakarta, where she began to actively seek more commissions. In 1956, Trijoto received a commission from General of Police Said Soekanto Tjokrodiatmodjo to erect a sculpture at the National Police Headquarters in Jakarta. She delivered Sinar dan Bayangan (Light and Shadow), which depicted two muscular men atop a column holding a burning torch. The base was engraved with scenes representing police duties. Another commission in the 1950s was a sculpture of Garuda with a 3-metre (9.8 ft) wingspan, which was installed in front of the Maguwoharjo Airfield in Yogyakarta.

In 1958 Trijoto married a doctor named Slamet, who had helped establish the hospital at the Muhammadiyah University of Surakarta. The couple had two children. Initially, Slamet supported her sculpture. However, when it exacerbated her asthma, Slamet forbade her from using stone. He did permit her to use clay, which had fewer detrimental effects.

Trijoto died at home on 8 January 1989. She was buried at the Wahidin Soedirohoesodo Family Graveyard in Sleman, Yogyakarta, after a funeral attended by thousands—including the Prince of Mangkubumi. Her family reported that, four days before her death, she had expressed a desire to sculpt all of the National Heroes of Indonesia and mass produce them to replace busts of Wolfgang Amadeus Mozart and Ludwig van Beethoven throughout Indonesia.

== Art ==
Trijoto used a range of materials, starting with clay and later working with stones, metals, and marble. She preferred working with stone, as the material reminded her of the indigenous sculptors of monuments such as Borobudur and Prambanan temples. Thematically, she primarily depicted animals and revolutionaries, realized through expressive realism. Her works were characterized, according to the arts critic Karen Hardini, by strong lines that nonetheless had a soft touch.

Trijoto has been identified as Indonesia's first female sculptor, and in an obituary in the newspaper Kompas the arts writer Agus Dermawan T. also described her as Indonesia's first professional sculptor. Despite this, as of 2025, Trijoto and her work had received little scholarly attention, which Hardini attributes to the politics of changing regimes as well as the general marginalization of women artists in Indonesia. Histories of Indonesian art have focused more on Trijoto's father Abdullah and her brother Basuki, while discussions specifically about Trijoto have been primarily published in compendia of Indonesian women artists.

Trijoto's only surviving sculpture is the Ketaton Bull Monument. In 1990, the monument was moved from the Madiun Heroes' Cemetery to Wilis Stadium. It was also modified to remove the warrior and the original inscription, reducing the political symbolism of the bull during the New Order. Her sculpture Sinar dan Bayangan was removed in 1962 and replaced with a statue of Gadjah Mada; as of 2025, its whereabouts are unknown. Similarly, the Garuda sculpture at Maguwoharjo had been replaced by 1989.

== Works cited ==
- Dermawan T, Agus (29 January 1989). "Mengenang Trijoto Abdullah" [Remembering Trijoto Abdullah] (PDF). Kompas (in Indonesian). Archived from the original (PDF) on 3 February 2019.
- Dirgantoro, Wulan (2017). Feminisms and Contemporary Art in Indonesia: Defining Experiences. Amsterdam: Amsterdam University Press. pp. 77–118. doi:10.1017/9789048526994. ISBN 978-90-485-2699-4.
- Hardini, Karen (2024). "Persona dan Pesona Perempuan dalam Seni Patung Indonesia" [A Woman's Persona and Impact on Indonesian Sculpture]. In Hardini, Karen; Nugraha, Latief S. (eds.). KRTYA: Profil Pematung Yogyakarta [KRTYA: Profile of Yogyakarta Sculptors] (PDF) (in Indonesian). Yogyakarta: UPT Taman Budaya. pp. 1–9. ISBN 978-623-98370-3-7. Archived from the original (PDF) on 19 June 2026.
- Lusandiana, Lisistrata; Amalia, Rifda (2021). Tridjoto Abdullah: Nasionalisme Benteng Ketaton [Tridjoto Abdullah: Nationalism of the Ketaton Bull] (in Indonesian). Yogyakarta: Pusaka Seni Rupa Indonesia.
- Orang Indonesia jang Terkemoeka di Djawa [Prominent Indonesians in Java] (PDF) (in Indonesian). Jakarta: Gunseikanbu. 1944.
- Sanjaya, Gie (2025). "Trijoto Abdullah". Archives of Women Artists, Research, and Exhibitions. Centre Pompidou. Archived from the original on 9 June 2026.
