= Agus Djaya =

Indonesian painter (1913–1994)

Raden Agoes Djajasoeminta
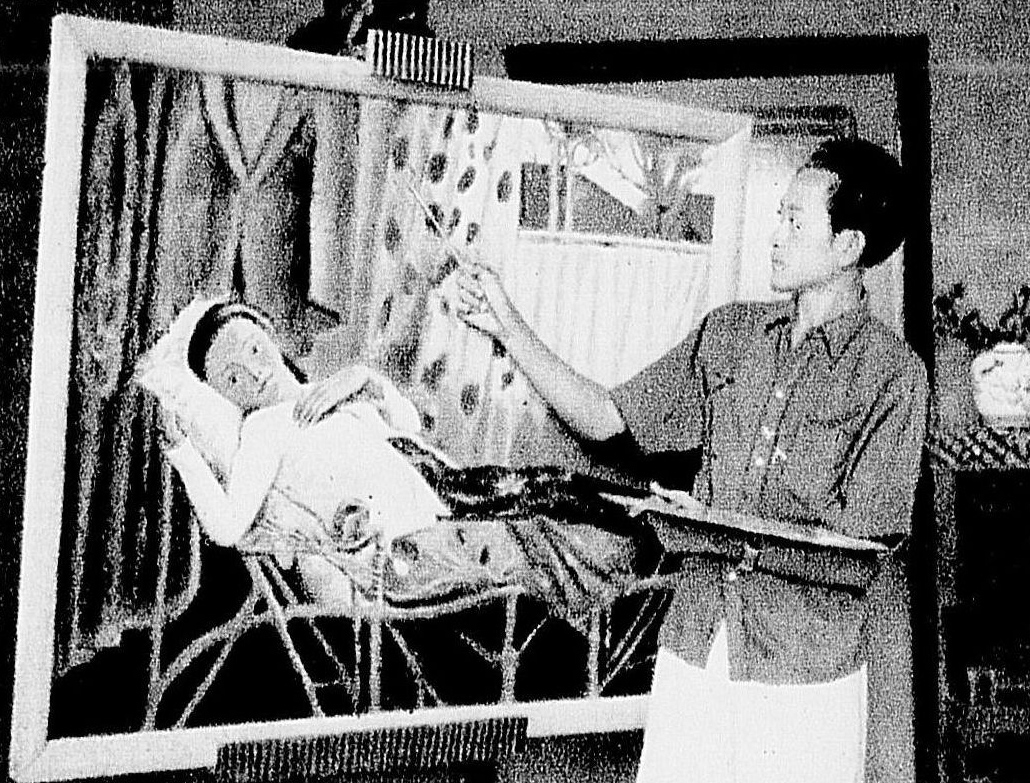
- Djaya, 1943
- Born: 1 April 1913; Pandeglang, Banten, Dutch East Indies
- Died: 24 April 1994 (aged 81)
- Style: Fauvism, expressionism
- Relatives: Otto Djaya (brother)

Raden Agoes Djajasoeminta (Enhanced Spelling: Agus Jayasuminta, 1 April 1913 – 24 April 1994), better known as Agus Djaya, was an modernist Indonesian painter. Born to a civil servant in Banten, Djaya was educated at Dutch-run schools. He had begun teaching art by 1934, and in 1938 he collaborated with fellow painter S. Sudjojono to establish the Indonesian Painters Association (Persatuan Ahli Gambar Indonesia; PERSAGI). Under Djaya's leadership, the artist collective held several exhibitions. During the Japanese occupation of 1942–1945, Djaya led the visual arts division of the Institute for People's Education and Cultural Guidance.

Having received military training from the Japanese, Djaya joined the People's Security Army at the outbreak of the Indonesian National Revolution. However, he soon returned to art, and in 1947 left for the Netherlands with his brother Otto. During their time in Europe, the Djayas held several exhibitions that included works from their collection. After returning to Indonesia, Agus Djaya spent some time in Jakarta before settling in Bali, where he spent the rest of his life. Djaya's early works have been described as blending fauvism and expressionism, while his later works are identified as more commercially oriented.

== Biography ==
=== Early life ===
Djaya was born in Pandeglang, Banten, Dutch East Indies (now Indonesia) on 1 April 1913. The son of a civil servant, his father's status allowed him to receive a good education. Djaya graduated from a Dutch-run school for indigenous children before continuing his studies at a junior high school and an agricultural institute; the latter was not completed. He was also able to travel to the colonial capital in Batavia (now Jakarta), and learn Dutch and other European languages. In his art, Djaya was primarily self-taught, though he did receive instruction from the Dutch educator P. Pijpers through the Batavia Art Society.

=== Art career ===
Djaya had begun teaching art by 1934, and was recorded as a faculty member at the Arjuna School. On 23 October 1938, Djaya established the Indonesian Painters Association (Persatuan Ahli Gambar Indonesia; PERSAGI) together with fellow painter S. Sudjojono. The collective was headed by Agus Djaya, with Sudjojono fulfilling the role of secretary, and later spokesperson. PERSAGI would go on to include some twenty or thirty members.

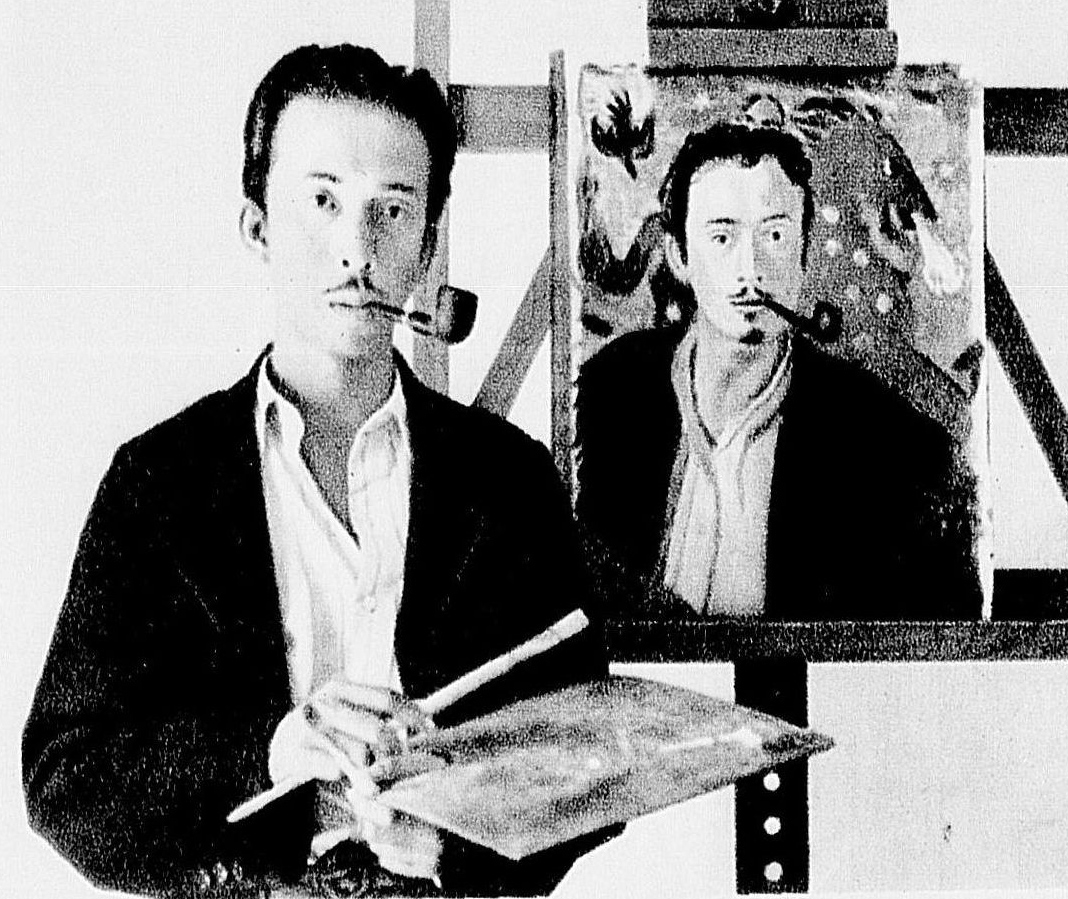
S. Sudjojono, with whom Djaya established the Indonesian Painters Association

PERSAGI held two major exhibitions, one in 1940 at the Kolff bookstore and another sponsored by the Kunstkring in May 1941. During the latter exhibition, Djaya's paintings represented half of all works displayed. Outside of these exhibitions, works by Djaya were also included in a 1940 exhibition titled the Indiche Schilders Weebar (Painters for a Fortified Indonesia). Following the success of these exhibitions, Djaya left his career as a teacher to focus on his art.

Following the Japanese occupation of the Dutch East Indies in 1942, PERSAGI was dissolved. Djaya joined the Institute for People's Education and Cultural Guidance, a cultural organization that had been established for propaganda purposes. Djaya was put in charge of the visual arts division, under the supervision of Kenji Yoshioka. Members of the division included established painters such as Sudjojono, Basuki Resobowo, and Basuki Abdullah, as well as Djaya's younger brother Otto, whom Agus had taught personally. Djaya's duties included organizing exhibitions and teaching the arts. He was involved in the Center of the People's Power.

=== Indonesian national revolution ===
Under the Japanese occupation, Djaya received some military training, During the Indonesian National Revolution that began in 1945, Djaya joined the Indonesian forces, enlisting with the Third Division of the Sukabumi Regiment of the People's Security Army. He attained the rank of major, and later worked with the intelligence unit. In 1946, he arranged for a meeting of pro-Indonesian artists in Sukabumi, and around this time he was photographed in his studio by the Netherlands Indies Government Information Service. Later that year, Agus and Otto began preparing for a new national museum in Jakarta; the two also held a joint exhibit in early 1947.

Djaya received a scholarship through a programme initiated by Hubertus van Mook through which he would study in the Netherlands. He received a letter of introduction from the Indonesian Ministry of Foreign Affairs, in which he was identified as a representative of the newspaper Merdeka. Otto joined him, and in a 1999 interview indicated that the brothers had been sent as spies for the revolutionary government. The brothers' journey to the Netherlands has also been described as "cultural diplomacy" and "psy-war".

Aboard the Niuew Holland, the Djaya brothers arrived in Amsterdam in 1947. They brought with them a collection of modernist Indonesian art. While continuing to work, producing Kuda Lumping I (Horse Dancer I) among others, Agus attended the Royal Academy of Fine Arts as well as the Gemeente Universiteit (now the University of Amsterdam). The brothers established networks with several Dutch academics, including the political thinker Willem Frederik Wertheim, art educator Theodoor Galestin, and museum director Willem Sandberg. They organized a joint exhibitions at Stedelijk Museum Amsterdam (1947), the Indisch Museum (now the Wereldmuseum Amsterdam, 1947–1948) and the Kunstzaal Van Lier (1948). Outside of Amsterdam, the brothers exhibited in The Hague and Dordrecht as well as Belgium, France, and Monaco.

=== Later life ===
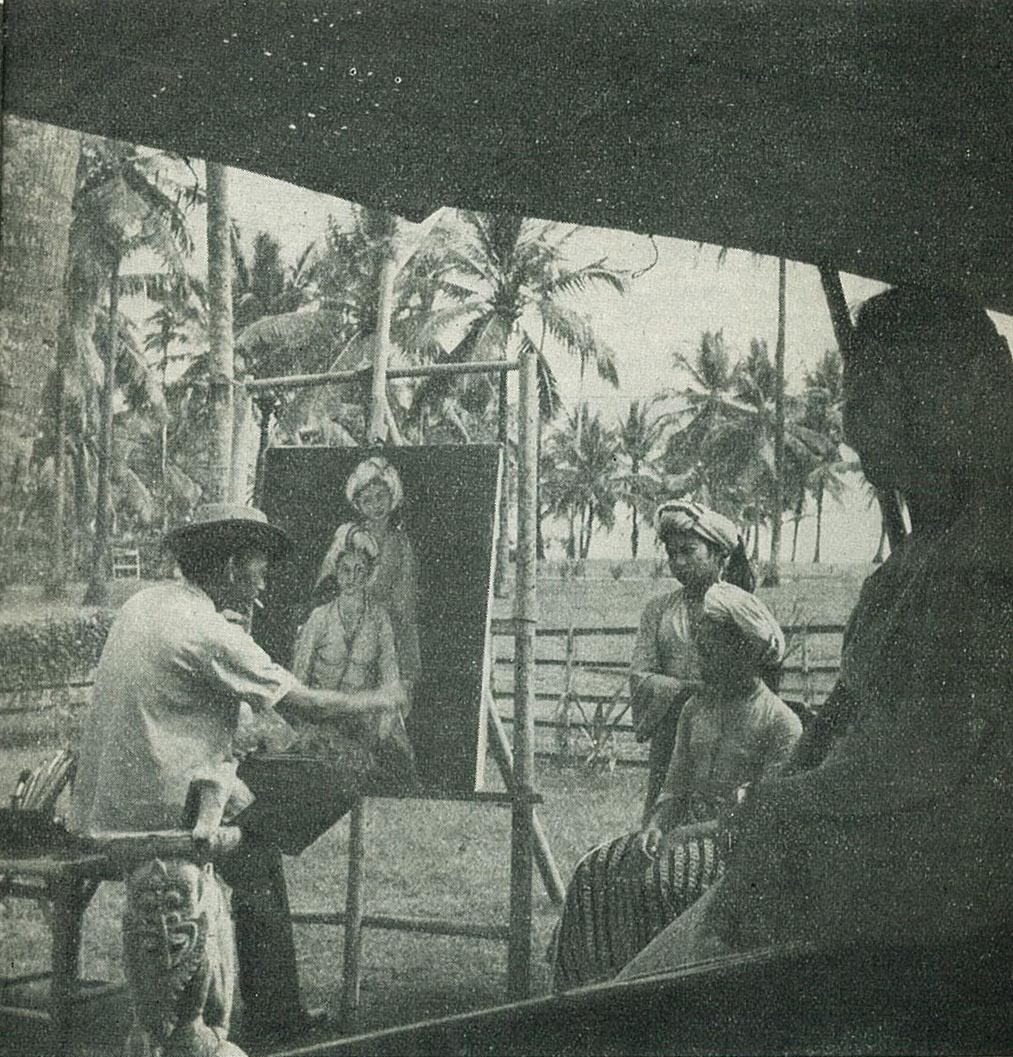
Djaya at his studio in Bali, c. 1957

Djaya returned to Indonesia in 1949 or 1950. He initially remained in the national capital of Jakarta, running a studio called Nan Jaya in Menteng. This studio was destroyed by fire in 1953. By the middle of the decade, Djaya had moved to Bali to escape the highly politicized atmosphere of the national capital in Jakarta. He painted extensively for the tourist market, with his studio located on the popular Kuta Beach. At the same time, his works remained popular with Indonesian collectors. Numerous items were acquired by President Sukarno, who also commissioned several works.

In 1958, Djaya received two Satyalencana awards for his contributions to the Indonesian national revolution. During the widespread unrest that followed the fall of Sukarno and rise of Suharto, Djaya's studio and gallery at Kuta was damaged. Djaya relocated to the Sanur area in the 1970s. He held a solo exhibition at Taman Ismail Marzuki in Jakarta in 1976. Djaya died on 24 April 1994, a year after receiving a lifetime achievement award for his contributions to Indonesian art.

== Art and legacy ==
Generally, paintings by Djaya are not overtly political, though numerous works completed during the Japanese occupation illustrated scenes of battle and combat. Common subjects include works derived from Javanese mythology as well as everyday life. He also occasioned to paint friends and family. In the 1950s, his inspirations included the reliefs found on the Hindu and Buddhist temples found through the Indonesian archipelago.

In his style, Matt Cox of the Routledge Encyclopedia of Modernism describes Djaya as blending fauvism and expressionism, though the American art historian Claire Holt writes that his expressionist tendencies were much diminished during his time in Bali, at which time commercial interests were more dominant. Meanwhile, the Indonesian curator Amir Sidharta describes Djaya's works of the 1950s as more sophisticated in their composition, though he also deems later paintings to have lost their "guiding light".

Writing in 1967, Holt deemed Djaya to have a reputation based more on his previous achievements rather than contemporary output. Sidharta described Djaya as having become a neglected painter by the 2010s, with no in-depth studies of his art. In 2018, the Stedelijk Museum held a retrospective exhibition focused on the anti-colonial messaging spread by the Djaya brothers through their artwork.

== Works cited ==
- Adryamarthanino, Verelladevanka; Ningsih, Widya Lestari (23 March 2022). "Agus Djaya, Pendiri Organisasi Persagi" [Agus Djaya, Founder of the Organization Persagi]. Kompas (in Indonesian). Archived from the original on 5 June 2026.
- Cox, Matt (2016). "Djaya, Agus (1913–1994)". Routledge Encyclopedia of Modernism. doi:10.4324/9781135000356-REM416-1. ISBN 978-1-135-00035-6.
- "De Bataviasche Kunstkring Schilderijententoonstelling" [The Batavia Art Circle Exhibition]. Bataviaasch Nieuwsblad (in Dutch). Batavia. 7 May 1941. p. 3.
- Dirgantoro, Wulan (2017). Feminisms and Contemporary Art in Indonesia: Defining Experiences. Amsterdam: Amsterdam University Press. pp. 77–118. doi:10.1017/9789048526994. ISBN 978-90-485-2699-4.
- Hafiz, Syed Muhammad (2015). "Manifesting the Nation: Realities and Realisms". Between Declarations and Dreams: Art of Southeast Asia Since the 19th Century. National Gallery Singapore. pp. 56–63. doi:10.2307/j.ctvgc6016.8. ISBN 978-981-09-7349-0. JSTOR j.ctvgc6016.8.
- Holt, Claire (1967). Art in Indonesia: Continuities and Change. Ithaca, New York: Cornell University Press. ISBN 978-0-8014-0188-6.
- Raben, Remco (2009). "In Search of Freedom". In Knol, Meta; Raben, Remco; Zijlmans, Kitty (eds.). Beyond the Dutch: Indonesia, the Netherlands, and the Visual Arts, from 1900 until Now. Leiden: KIT Publishers. pp. 83–92. ISBN 978-94-6022-059-3.
- Sambrani, Chaitanya (2016). "PERSAGI (Persatuan Ahli-Ahli Gambar Indonesia)". Routledge Encyclopedia of Modernism. doi:10.4324/9781135000356-REM895-1. ISBN 978-1-135-00035-6.
- Sidharta, Amir (4 January 2019). "Agus Djaya: Once Victorious, Later Neglected". Now! Jakarta. Archived from the original on 5 June 2026.
- Winking, Kerstin (8 June 2018). "Fighting Colonial Claims to Power: Agus Djaya and Otto Djaya in Amsterdam 1947-1950". Stedelijk Museum Amsterdam. Archived from the original on 5 June 2026.
- Yuliman, Sanento (2023) [1977]. "New Indonesian Painting". In Kent, Elly; Hooker, Virginia; Turner, Caroline (eds.). Living Art: Indonesian Artists Engage Politics, Society and History. Asian Studies. Vol. 17. Translated by Kent, Elly. Canberra: ANU Press. pp. 109–144. ISBN 978-1-76046-493-6.
