= Otto Djaya =

Indonesian painter (1916–2002)

Otto Djajasoentara
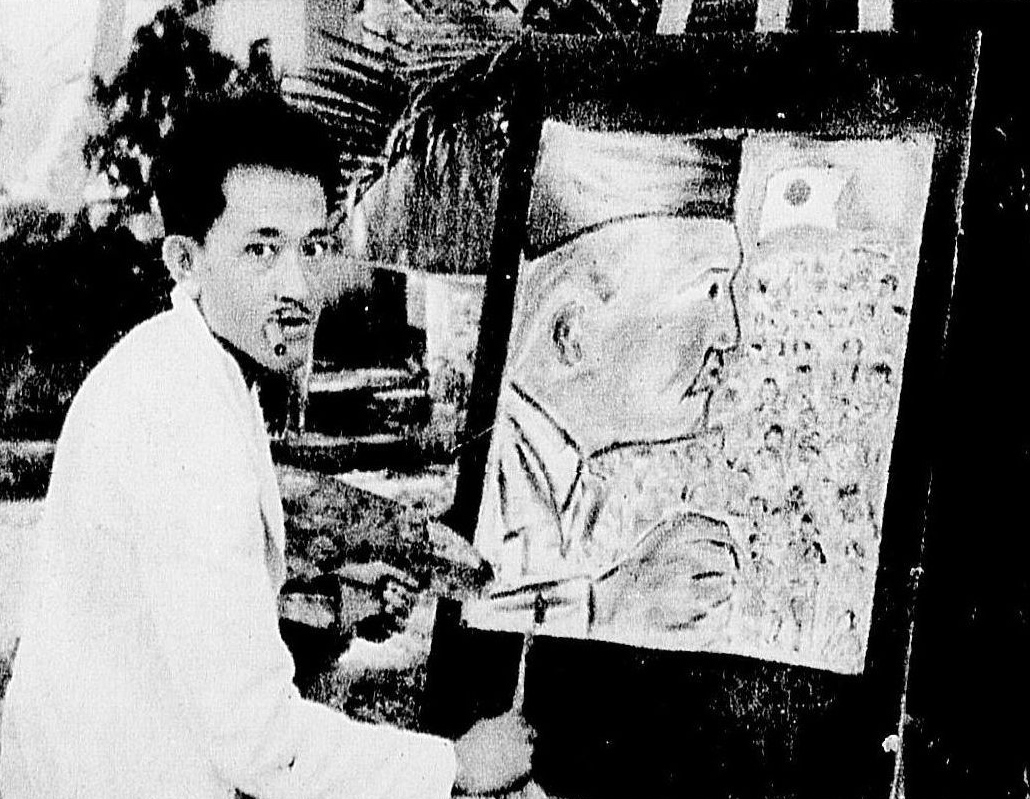
- Djaya, 1943
- Born: 6 October 1916; Rangkasbitung, Banten, Dutch East Indies
- Died: 23 June 2002 (aged 85)
- Style: Impressionism
- Relatives: Agus Djaya (brother)

Otto Djajasoentara (Enhanced Spelling: Otto Jayasuntara, 6 October 1916 – 23 June 2002), better known as Otto Djaya, was an Indonesian painter. Born to a civil servant, Djaya followed his elder brother Agus into art as a member of the Indonesian Painters Association. During the Japanese occupation, Djaya was a member of the Cultural Centre and received training with the Defenders of the Homeland. After time fighting with the People's Security Army in the Indonesian National Revolution, Otto was dispatched with Agus to the Netherlands, where they exhibited Indonesian art. Djaya returned to Indonesia in 1950, and after marriage he focused more on raising his family than on his art. In the 1990s, Djaya began to dedicate himself to painting, holding exhibitions in Jakarta and Yogyakarta.

Noted for his impressionist influences, Djaya's style has been described as replete with humour, with particular emphasis given to his human figures and depictions of everyday life in Indonesia. Several posthumous exhibitions have featured his works, including at the National Gallery of Indonesia in Jakarta and the Stedelijk Museum in Amsterdam. However, in histories of Indonesian art, Djaya has been less prominent than his brother and their contemporary S. Sudjojono.

== Biography ==
Djaya was born in Rangkasbitung, Banten, in the Dutch East Indies (now Indonesia) on 6 October 1916. His father was a civil servant descended from the aristocracy, and had served as the district chief of Pandeglang. This enabled Otto and his elder brother Agus Djaya to receive an education at Dutch-run schools and learn several European languages. Otto graduated from secondary school in 1936.

Otto took up painting, learning from Agus, who had studied art in the Indies and the Netherlands. He joined the Indonesian Painters Association (PERSAGI), which Agus had co-founded with S. Sudjojono, and began studying under Sudjojono. During this period, Djaya and his contemporaries had difficulty selling their works, as the colonial market was dominated by depictions of beautiful landscapes. During the Japanese occupation of the Dutch East Indies of 1942–1945, Djaya joined the Cultural Centre, where Agus led the arts division. He also received military training, and joined the Japanese-established Defenders of the Homeland. After Indonesia proclaimed its independence on 17 August 1945, Otto joined the Third Division of the Sukabumi Regiment, People's Security Army, with Agus. During the ensuing national revolution, he rose to the rank of major.

Between February and March 1947, Otto held a joint exhibition with Agus in Jakarta. Having received a Malino scholarship, the brothers subsequently departed for Amsterdam aboard the steamboat Nieuw Holland. They took with them more than a hundred artworks—from paintings to divination books—for exhibition in Europe. Staying mostly in the Netherlands, the brothers established networks with Dutch residents who supported Indonesian independence while also studying art at the Rijksakademie and journalism at Gemeente Universiteit (now the University of Amsterdam).

The brothers also held several exhibitions while in Europe. These included three in Amsterdam—at the Stedelijk Museum (1947), Indisch Museum (now the Wereldmuseum, 1947–1948), and the Kunstzaal Van Lier—as well as The Hague, Dordrecht, Paris, and Monaco. They also received prizes for their artistic works, and accessed numerous arts magazines that expanded their horizons. In a 2002 discussion with the curator Amir Sidharta, Otto Djaya stated that the brothers had also been tasked by President Sukarno to spy on the Dutch during their scholarship.

The brothers returned to Indonesia in 1950, with Otto establishing a studio in Jakarta. In 1952, after marriage, he moved to Semarang, where he worked at a printing house to support his family. He later moved to Yogyakarta, where he managed a hotel. Focusing on these activities, he had little time for painting, and productivity decreased. Nevertheless, he continued to exhibit, showing several paintings at a barbershop in Semarang and holding a solo exhibition at Ismail Marzuki Park from 9 to 14 January 1978.

In the early 1990s, Djaya again dedicated himself to painting, though without a sponsor and having lost his earlier fame he initially experienced difficulty re-restablishing himself. This was ameliorated by financial support from President Suharto. Djaya exhibited at the National Gallery of Indonesia in 1995. In 1999, he held solo exhibitions in Yogyakarta, where he displayed 35 new works, as well as Legong Fine Art in Jakarta. Djaya died on 23 June 2002 in Depok, West Java, where he had lived with his children and a nurse.

== Legacy ==
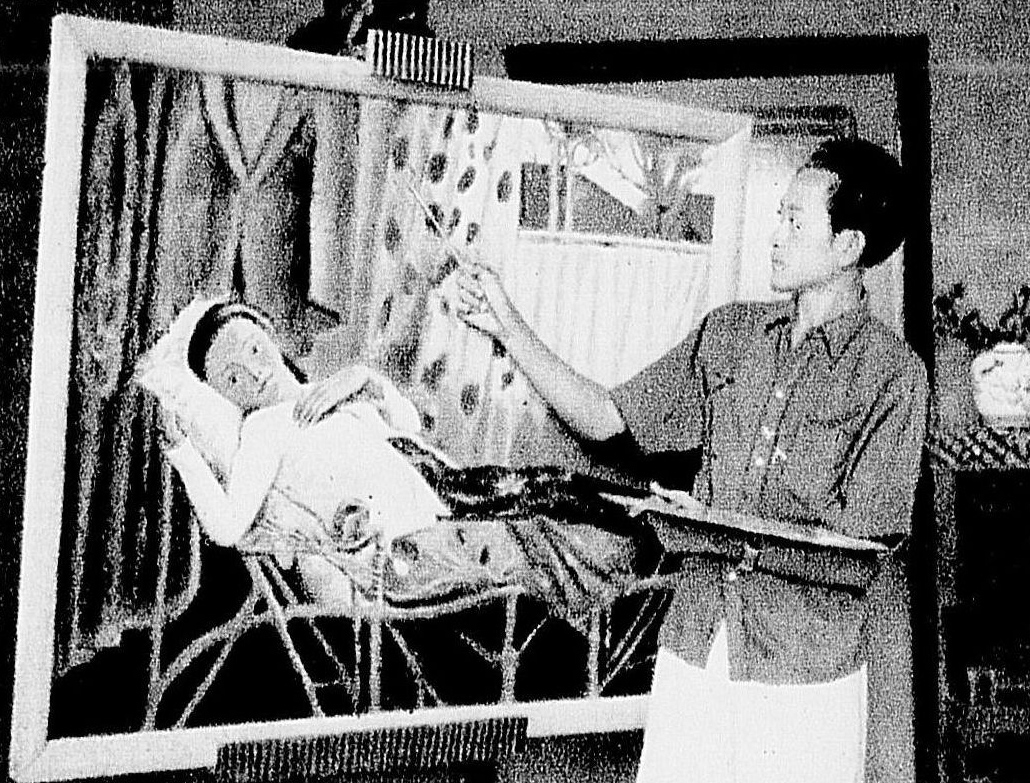
Otto Djaya's elder brother Agus, whose influences are evident in several works

Otto drew heavily from impressionism, with the figures in his artworks drawing stylistically from the reliefs on the candi (Hindu/Buddhist temples) of Indonesia. Stylistically, several of his works show the influence of Agus Djaya, with the American art historian Claire Holt noting a shared "agitated quality". Many of the scenes depicted in Djaya's works draw from everyday life in Java, including markets, weddings, traditional performances, and transportation, though elements of fantasy and mythology were also incorporated. His works have been described as replete with sarcasm and humour. Reviewing his 1978 exhibition, Bambang Bujono of Tempo magazine described Djaya's caricatural depictions of human figures as his greatest strength.

Critical reception of Djaya's works has been mixed. Writing in the Christian Science Monitor about an exhibit of Indonesian paintings in New York, Dorothy Adlow highlighted Djaya's Dream, describing it as drawing from Paul Gauguin and replete with "brilliant intensities and rich decorative detail". Writing in Tempo, Arif Zulkifli, W. S. Endah, and Dedy Sinaga described Djaya's works as less powerful than his brother's. The art critic Jim Supangkat described Djaya's works as less popular than those of his contemporaries at PERSAGI, which he attributed to Djaya's style diverging from those of Agus and Sudjojono. The latter two have remained more prominent in Indonesian art histories than Otto, resulting in Resty Armenia of CNN Indonesia describing him as existing in their shadows.

To commemorate the centennial of Djaya's birth, the National Gallery of Indonesia held an exhibit titled "100 Tahun Otto Djaya (1916–2002)" (100 Years of Otto Djaya [1916–2002]) in September 2016. Consisting of 172 paintings, the exhibition was curated by Inge-Marie and Hans Peter Holst and coincided with the publication of the book The World of Otto Djaya (1916–2002). In 2018, the Stedelijk Museum held an exhibition titled "The Djaya Brothers: Revolusi in the Stedelijk". The museum holds several works by the brothers, which were donated prior to their return to Indonesia. Works by Djaya were purchased by President Sukarno and held in his collection.

== Works cited ==
- Adlow, Dorothy (1 March 1952). "Indonesian and French Art". The Christian Science Monitor. Vol. 44, no. 81. p. 10.
- Agnes, Tia (30 September 2016). "Pameran Seabad Master Seni Rupa Otto Djaya Dibuka Malam Ini" [Exhibition 'A Century of Maestro Otto Djaya' Opens Tonight]. Detik.com (in Indonesian). Archived from the original on 15 August 2026.
- Armenia, Resty (6 October 2016). "Otto Djaya, Ruang Sempit di Indonesia dan Pengakuan di Eropa" [Otto Djaya, Limited Space in Indonesia, Recognized in Europe]. CNN Indonesia (in Indonesian). Archived from the original on 15 August 2026.
- Bujono, Bambang (21 January 1978). "Otto Djaya 1977". Tempo (in Indonesian). Vol. 7, no. 47. p. 47.
- Danarto (5 September 1999). "Petruk Menikmati Hidup" [Petruk Enjoying Life]. Tempo (in Indonesian). Vol. 28, no. 26. p. 91.
- Holt, Claire (1967). Art in Indonesia: Continuities and Change. Ithaca, New York: Cornell University Press. ISBN 978-0-8014-0188-6.
- Rahmiasri, Masajeng (3 October 2016). "Foreign Curator Brings Otto Djaya's Paintings to Indonesian Audience". The Jakarta Post. Archived from the original on 15 August 2026.
- Suharto (1991). Soeharto, My Thoughts, Words, and Deeds: An Autobiography. Translated by Sumadi. Jakarta: Citra Lamtoro Gung Persada. ISBN 978-979-8085-01-7.
- Winking, Kerstin (8 June 2018). "Fighting Colonial Claims to Power: Agus Djaya and Otto Djaya in Amsterdam 1947-1950". Stedelijk Museum Amsterdam. Archived from the original on 5 June 2026.
- Wirayudha, Randy (7 September 2018). "Utusan Seni Merangkap Telik Sandi" [An Arts Delegation Wrapped in Secrecy]. Historia.id (in Indonesian). Archived from the original on 15 August 2026.
- Zulkifli, Arif; Endah, W.S.; Sinaga, Dedy (7 July 2002). "Di Antara Relief Candi dan Garis Karikatural" [Between Temple Reliefs and Caricatural Lines]. Tempo (in Indonesian). Vol. 31, no. 18. p. 138.
