= Routledge Encyclopedia of Modernism =

Specialized English-language online encyclopedia

Routledge Encyclopedia of Modernism is an online encyclopedia published by Routledge since 2016.

The encyclopedia has been reviewed by the Reference Reviews of Emerald Group Publishing. It has been called the "dada of encyclopedias" by The Times Literary Supplement.
