= Keimin Bunka Shidōsho =

Indonesian cultural institution, 1943–1945

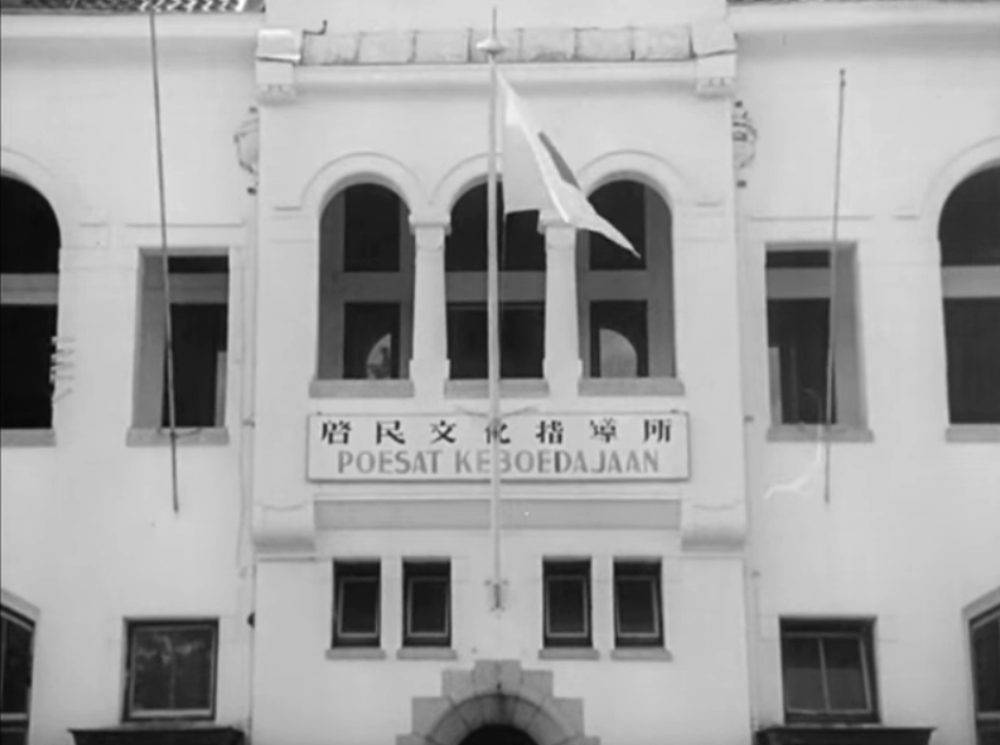
Keimin Bunka Shidōsho Office in Djakarta

Keimin Bunka Shidōsho (啓民文化指導所; lit. "Cultural Enlightenment and Guidance Center", but more correctly "Institute for People's Education and Cultural Guidance", Indonesian: Poesat Keboedajaan) was a Japanese-sponsored art and cultural institution in the Dutch East Indies during the Japanese Occupation in World War II.

== History ==
Keimin Bunka Shidōsho was founded in The Dutch East Indies in accordance with the Japanese Film Law enacted in July 1939. The Film Law was created by the Japanese Home Ministry to oversee the creation, regulation, and substantial supervision of films, censorship, and to tighten the regulation of film companies and movie publications.

On 8 March 1942, The Dutch East Indies was occupied by the Imperial Japanese Army. In order to increase support for Japan among the native Indonesian people, the Japanese Imperial administration used political, artistic and cultural propaganda to reach the populace. Upon their arrival to The East Indies, Japan had tried to foment support among the Pribumi population for "Indonesian Independence", with the intention of furthering its own interests, especially in the ongoing Pacific War. Japan soon confiscated former film companies run by the Dutch, instead putting film productions under the supervision of Nippon Eigasha.

On 9 January 1943, the Japanese administration set up a magazine called Djawa Baroe (literally, The New Java). It was a propaganda magazine which promoted literary works based upon Greater East Asian literature. In order to remove Western influences, the propaganda they published in Djawa Baroe included slogans that demonizes the allies, and the cruelty of the Dutch. While most of the writers at Djawa Baore were Japanese, there were also Indonesian writers, musicians, playwrights and theater artists involved with the magazine.

== Founding ==
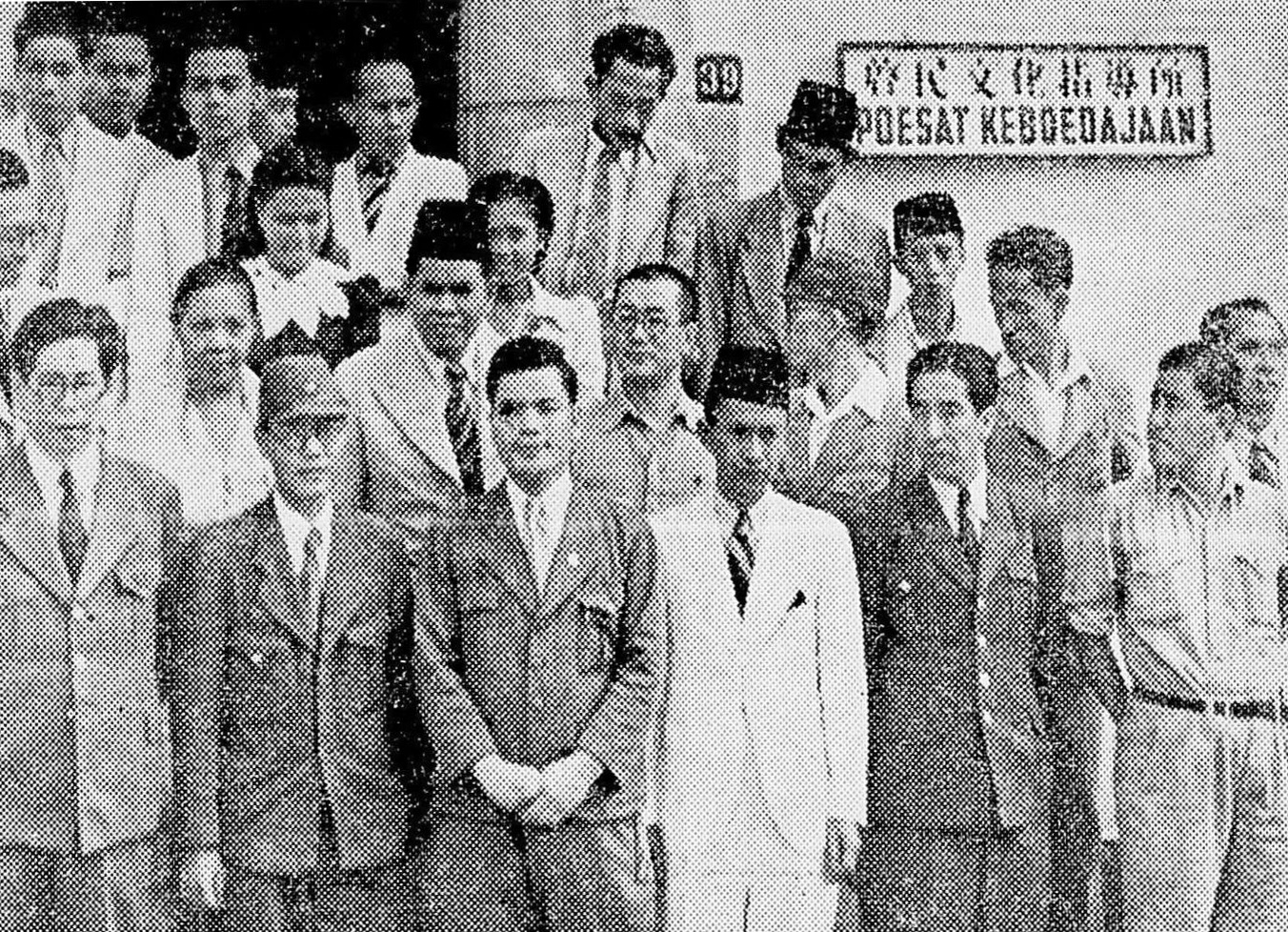
Keimin Bunka Shidōsho members after their 1st meeting

On 1 April 1943, the Japanese administration established the Keimin Bunka Shidōsho in Djakarta. Through this cultural institution, Japan tried to spread awareness of the unity of Greater East Asia among the Indonesian people in order to support them in the war. Soon after Keimin Bunka Shidōsho was founded, many artists were attracted to work in it, with the aim of broadening the skills of Indonesian artists.

The Japanese Authorities set up cinemas in West, Central and East Java for screening propaganda films or documentaries. The Japanese viewed film as an efficient and effective way to deliver propaganda messages. The Sendenbu successfully recruited a large number of Japanese and Indonesian artists to participate in these films.

The Japanese administration invited various artists, painters and composers from Japan, such as Iida Nobuo (飯田信夫), Kōno Takashi (河野鷹思), Kurata Bunjin (倉田文人), Hinatsu Eitarō (日夏英太郎), Yokoyama Ryūichi (横山隆一), Saseo Ono (小野佐世男), Koiso Ryōhei (小磯良平), and Hajime Itō. Indonesian artists such as Kusbini, S. Sudjojono, Emiria Sunassa, Basuki Abdullah, Barli Sasmitanata, Agus Djajasuminta and Iton Lesmana were also associated with the organization.

The Indonesian painters who worked at Keimin Bunka Shidōsho were, for the first time, trained in a contemporary fine arts and were fully sponsored and supported by the state. Indonesian artist Barli Sasmitawinata recalled his experience:

In the Dutch days, oil paint was very expensive for us as young artists to buy. But the Japanese occupation was not a bad time for us artists. The Japan Culture Center provided us with oil paint, canvases, brushes… everything for free. Every month a truck came to deliver painting material. Oil paint came not in tubes, but in bigger containers. When we ran out of painting material, all I had to do was to telephone or write to the headquarters in Jakarta. As for drawing paper, they supplied us with rolls of paper.
