= Emiria Sunassa =

Indonesian artist (1895–1964)

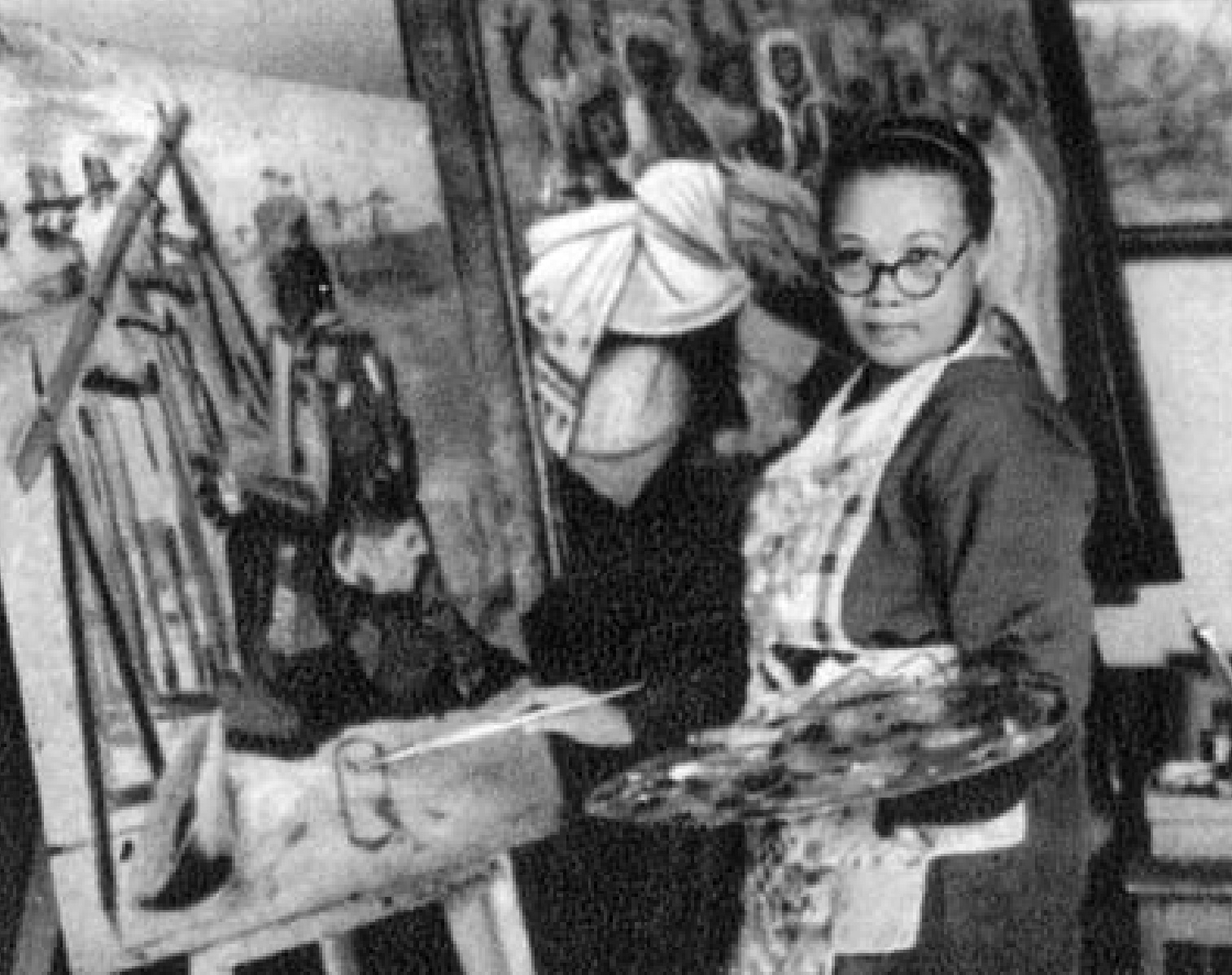
- Emiria in her studio, 1943
- Born: 5 August 1894
- Died: 1964 (aged 69–70)

Emiria Soenassa (Enhanced Spelling: Emiria Sunassa, 5 August 1894 – 1964) was an Indonesian artist. Little is known about her early life, including her place of birth, though she claimed to be the daughter of the Sultan of Tidore. She travelled extensively from the 1910s through the 1930s, working variously as a secretary and nurse in Java, studying Dalcroze eurhythmics in Europe, and then holding various jobs from Sumatra to West Papua. In the late 1930s, she settled in Batavia (now Jakarta), where she took up painting while working as a secretary. She soon joined the Indonesian Painters Association (Persatuan Ahli Gambar Indonesia; PERSAGI), with whom she had her first exhibitions, and remained active until 1959.

Emiria described art as her hobby, and has been variously identified as an autodidact and a mentee of the art critic Guillaume Frederic Pijper. She used various styles, experimenting with cubism and impressionism, though her works generally employed heavy brushstrokes. She most commonly painted indigenous peoples from eastern Indonesia, and gained a reputation as a primitivist who created dark and unsettling atmospheres. Though often labelled the "Mother of Indonesian Art", Emiria has also been marginalized in the Indonesian art canon.

== Biography ==
=== Early life ===
Emiria was born on 5 August 1894, in the Dutch East Indies (now Indonesia). Little is known for certain about her early life. She claimed to have been the daughter of Sahadjuan, the Sultan of Tidore, and to have the full name Emiria Sunassa Wama'na Poetri Al-Alam Mahkota Tidore; she was also known as Emma Wilhelmina Pareira. Other narratives have suggested that she was born in North Maluku or in the town of Tanawangko in North Sulawesi. She was likely of Tidorese descent, though she may have had Minahasan heritage. Her education at a primary school for Europeans, which she left after the third year, suggests that she came from an influential family.

By the 1910s, Emiria had travelled to Java, taking up stenography and typing. She studied nursing at Cikini Hospital in Batavia (now Jakarta) from 1912. In 1914, amidst the First World War, she departed for Europe, where she spent a year studying Dalcroze eurhythmics in Belgium and Austria; she was later reported to have fallen in love with a patient and followed him on these international travels. Emiria had returned to the Indies by 1916, spending another three years at Cikini before returning to secretarial work. From 1922 to 1924, she was secretary to A. H. Giel, the director of the Indies Bank. Emiria later travelled the archipelago, from Sumatra to Papua, frequently living in remote villages with indigenous peoples. This included time in Ternate, where she worked a singer and pianist, as well as Bandung and Halmahera. She worked diverse jobs during this period, including on plantations, at mines, and in factories. Accounts describe her variously as an elephant hunter, a poison-maker, and a "tiger woman".

=== Painting career ===
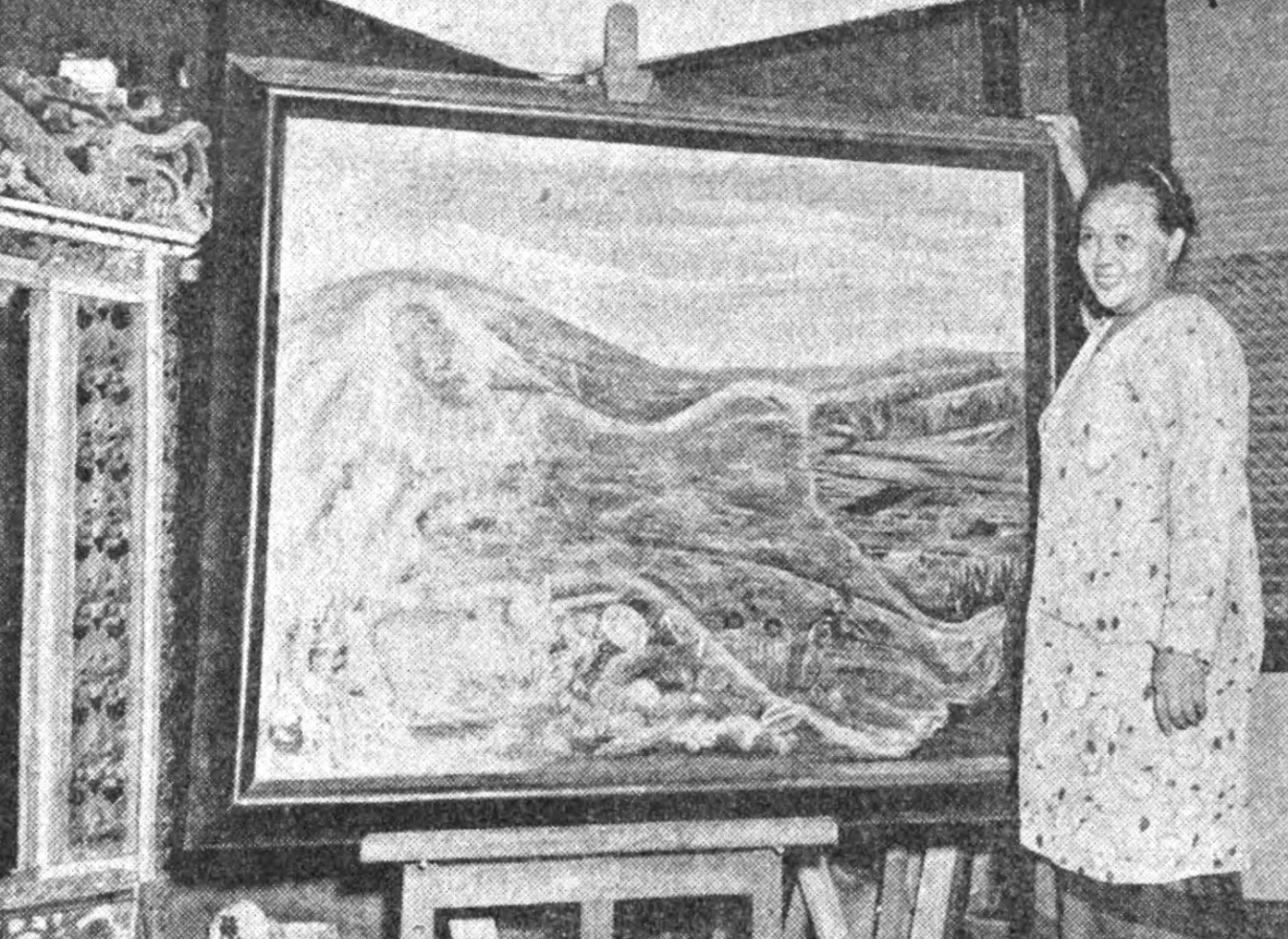
Emiria with her painting Ibu Pertiwi (Motherland), 1952

Emiria returned to Batavia in the 1930s, where she settled. She was first noted as a painter during this period. In a 1952 interview, she explained that she had taken up painting while working as a secretary for the Dutch professor and art critic Guillaume Frederic Pijper. When asked her opinion of Indonesian works in his catalogue, Emiria responded, "They mean nothing to me." She was subsequently challenged to produce a better work for Pijper's birthday, and during a trip to Lake Telaga Warna in Puncak she was inspired to work on a landscape. Pijper responded positively to the painting, and told her she had talent. Meanwhile, Iris Heidebrink writes in The Encyclopedia of Indonesia in the Pacific War that Emiria had taken up painting while in a romantic relationship with a member of the van Borselen family. (Note: Heidebrink (2009, p. 599) writes that Emiria became pregnant by her patron, giving birth to Anne van Borselen in 1937.)

Emiria joined the Indonesian Painters Association (Persatuan Ahli Gambar Indonesia; PERSAGI); along with Saptarita Latif and Trijoto Abdullah, she was one of the group's few women members. Her paintings were exhibited in PERSAGI's debut show in 1940, held at the Kolff bookstore, and again in 1941 at the Kunstkring. Shortly before the Japanese occupation in 1942, Emiria held a solo exhibition, which was reviewed favourably. She held another exhibition in 1943, during the occupation, with the Centre for People's Labour (Pusat Tenaga Rakyat; Poetera). She was also a member of the Keimin Bunka Shidōsho during this period, winning prizes for her paintings Pasar Buah (Fruit Market) and Angklung at exhibitions sponsored by the body. In 1946, during the Indonesian National Revolution, she held a solo exhibition to raise funds for the Red Cross.

Emiria remained in Batavia, later renamed Jakarta, and was reported to have completed 200 paintings by 1952. She was also active in efforts to gain Papuan self-recognition during the 1950s. In 1959, she held her final exhibition at Merdeka Gallery in Kebayoran, a group effort with artists that included Trisno Sumardjo and Oesman Effendi. She then left Jakarta. In July 1960, she was reported to be in Singapore, campaigning to be recognized as the rightful sovereign of West Papua. She is reported to have died in Lampung, Sumatra, in 1964. Her works were left to her neighbour, Jane Waworuntu.

== Art ==
Sources disagree about Emiria's formal training. Indonesian histories present her as an autodidact, while the art scholar Heidi Arbuckle suggests that she was mentored by Pijper. She was noted to paint in varied styles, experimenting with cubism and impressionism. No matter the style, the Ministry of Information described her works as united in shared "crudities and technical coarseness". She used thick and heavy brush strokes. Her works were reported to have been completed from memory, though the art historian Roger Nelson argues that Emiria based several works on photographs by the German artist Walter Spies.

Many of Emiria's works deal with Indonesia's traditional peoples, particularly those in the eastern islands. This subject matter was unfamiliar among urban art-goers, and distinguished her from other PERSAGI members, who frequently focused on revolutionaries. Her works were predominantly self-portraits, still-lifes, and depictions of Indonesian people. They included nudes, both self-portraits as well as those depicting others. For example, Mutiara Bermain (Pearls at Play) depicted nymphs above an open shell, referencing Botticelli's The Birth of Venus.

The Indonesian art scholar Kusnadi described Emiria's work as "born out of her primitive realisation of herself", creating "unsettling atmospheres or frightening tales." Arbuckle, meanwhile, describes Emiria as exploring "the dark, unexplored margins of the nation" while problematizing the concept of an imagined community. S. Sudjojono, the leader of PERSAGI, presented her paintings as stemming from "heartfelt emotion [that] springs like a boil on a virgin's lips", unbridled and unaccountable, with a machismo (kejantanan) greater than that of her male counterparts.

Exploring Emiria's portraits, Wulan Dirgantoro notes a tendency for subjects to engage viewers with a direct gaze, which she describes as emphasizing their agency. She further writes that, by recognizing the otherness of her subjects, Emiria presented a cosmopolitan view of nationalism that accommodates diverse cultures and rationalities, as well as native female sexuality. Meanwhile, taking a post-colonial perspective, Nelson describes Emiria's creation of art based on the works of a European as an "act of defiance" that "decentres the colonial encounter". The Indonesian art critic Citra Sasmita described Emiria's depictions of Papuans as antithetical to the glorification of "beautiful and exotic bodies" in mainstream art.

== Legacy ==
Emiria has been labelled the "Mother of Indonesian Art", and is considered by the American art historian Claire Holt as "the only renowned [Indonesian] woman painter of the older generation". In the canon of Indonesian art history, however, she has been marginalized. Based on the writings of Sudjojono, Arbuckle argues that this was realized through gendered language that sidelined Emiria's "potentially disruptive and subversive" works. Dirgantoro suggests further considerations, including Emiria's primitivist style, her lack of a patron, and her lack of personal links with male artists.

Holt was critical of Emiria's work, writing that, although some "works show flashes of power and originality", most were "lacking in strength and cohesion". Holt, as with many scholars after her, highlights Emiria's portraits of the indigenous peoples of Borneo and Papua as among her strongest. Nelson, comparing Emiria's Pucuk Layu (Wilting Stamen) and Tari Kebyar (Balinese Dancer) with Spies' photographs, writes that she "reanimates, refunctions, and supersedes" the earlier works.

In 2020, two of Emiria's paintings—Pucuk Layu and Tari Kebyar—were purchased by National Gallery Singapore. As of 2023, the works were undergoing conservation treatments and had not been exhibited. Another painting, Bahaya Belakang Kembang Terate (Danger Lurking Behind the Lotus), is also held by the gallery, which included Emiria as the only woman painter in its 2023 exhibition Familiar Others. Other works on display include Penari Bali (Balinese Dancer) at the Pelita Harapan University Museum, as well as Pengantin Dayak (Dayak Wedding) at the Museum of Fine Arts and Ceramics in Jakarta.

== Works cited ==
- "Emiria Sunassa: How She Came to Be a Painter" (PDF). Indonesian Affairs. Vol. 2, no. 2. Ministry of Information of Indonesia. April–May 1952. pp. 54–56.
- Dirgantoro, Wulan (2017). Feminisms and Contemporary Art in Indonesia: Defining Experiences. Amsterdam: Amsterdam University Press. pp. 77–118. doi:10.1017/9789048526994. ISBN 978-90-485-2699-4.
- Dirgantoro, Wulan (March 2019). "Interrogating the Feminine in Indonesian Modern and Contemporary Art". Southeast of Now: Directions in Contemporary and Modern Art in Asia. 3 (1): 77–118. doi:10.1353/sen.2019.0005. hdl:11343/355559.
- Heidebrink, Iris (2009). "Emiria Sunassa". In Post, Peter; Frederick, William H.; Heidebrink, Iris; Sato, Shigeru (eds.). The Encyclopedia of Indonesia in the Pacific War. Leiden: Brill. pp. 598–599. ISBN 978-90-04-19017-7.
- Holt, Claire (1967). Art in Indonesia: Continuities and Change. Ithaca, New York: Cornell University Press. ISBN 978-0-8014-0188-6.
- Lisa, Horikawa (2016). "Emiria Sunassa". In Wee, Low Sze; Lisa, Horikawa; Scott, Phoebe (eds.). Reframing Modernism: Painting from Southeast Asia, Europe and Beyond. Singapore: National Gallery Singapore. ISBN 978-981-09-9561-4.
- Low, Yvonne (2015). "Becoming Professional: Feminisms and the Rise of Women-centred Exhibitions in Indonesia". Australian and New Zealand Journal of Art. 15 (2): 210–224. doi:10.1080/14434318.2015.1089820.
- Nelson, Roger (2023). "Emiria Sunassa's Citational Paintings: 'Like a Boil on a Virgin's Lips'". Oxford Art Journal. 46 (3): 407–426. doi:10.1093/oxartj/kcad028.
- Oon, Amanda (23 April 2023). "Shades of Self: National Gallery Singapore Shines a Light on Indonesian Artist and "Queen of Papua," Emiria Sunassa". Plural. Archived from the original on 28 May 2026.
- Orang Indonesia jang Terkemoeka di Djawa [Prominent Indonesians in Java] (PDF) (in Indonesian). Jakarta: Gunseikanbu. 1944.
