= Di Depan Kelambu Terbuka =

1939 painting by Sindoedarsono Soedjojono

In Front of the Open Mosquito Net
- Di Depan Kelambu Terbuka (Indonesian)
- Artist: S. Sudjojono
- Year: 1939
- Medium: Oil on canvas
- Dimensions: 86 cm × 66 cm (34 in × 26 in)
- Location: Bogor Palace, Bogor, West Java, Indonesia

Di Depan Kelamboe Terboeka (Enhanced Spelling: Di Depan Kelambu Terbuka, lit. 'In Front of the Open Mosquito Net') is a 1939 oil painting on canvas by S. Sudjojono. This portrait depicts a woman seated in front of an open mosquito net, with hints of a four-poster bed behind her. One arm runs along the back of her chair, while the other grips the seat, creating a pose variously identified as showing tension and anxiety. The sitter was initially unknown, but has been identified as a sex worker named Adhesi, whom Sudjojono had sought to bring out of prostitution. The painting was purchased by Sukarno in the 1940s and remains in the collection of the Presidential Palace. It has been described as "one of the most iconic paintings of Indonesian modern art". Analysis has noted similarities to works by Raphael and Vincent van Gogh, and explored the work as a criticism of Dutch colonial rule.

== Description ==
Di Depan Kelambu Terbuka is an oil painting on canvas that measures 66 by 86 centimetres (26 in × 34 in). The work is completed with rapid brushstrokes, with sections of the canvas left empty. The painting was completed by S. Sudjojono in 1939. The artist had trained under several painters, including Mas Pirngadi and Abdullah Suriosubroto, but grown tired of the established "Beautiful Indies" (Mooi Indië) genre that he described as based around a "holy trinity" of mountains, coconut palms, and rice fields. He promoted the view that art should reflect reality, with its blemishes. Thematically, Di Depan Kelambu Terbuka was unprecedented in Indonesia at the time of its completion.

The painting depicts a woman wearing a flowered kebaya, with a dominance of yellows, reds, and greens, as well as a dark sarong with a red trim. Her black hair runs freely down her back, The subject is depicted sitting between two open curtains with one arm leaning on the chair and the other gripping the seat. The woman's face is pale and her lips are tightly pursed, while her black eyes stare forward. In the background is curlicue ironwork, indicating a four-poster bed. The painting includes Sudjojono's signature four times, as well as the place of completion—"Djakarta"—and year.

The pose depicted in Di Depan Kelambu Terbuka has been described variously as showing tension and anxiety. Simon Soon of the University of Melbourne describes the portrait as having an unsettling quality, with the subject's "sickly" body "clumsily propped up" against the chair. Writing for the National Portrait Gallery of Australia, the Indonesian art critic Aminudin Siregar views the pose as simultaneously mysterious and annoyed, as though the sitter "intends to leave as soon as the painting session finishes". In Art History, Kevin Chua presents the pose as concealing a feeling of dejection or anger.

== Subject ==
The subject of Di Depan Kelambu Terbuka was initially unidentified. In the 1950s, the Indonesian art community debated the identity of the sitter. Subsequently, the literata Sanusi Pane wrote that she seemed to be a woman who had seen suffering, while Umar Kayam of Gadjah Mada University explored the question in a front-page feature in the newspaper Kompas.

In her 2006 memoirs, Sudjojono's first wife Mia Bustam wrote that the sitter had been a sex worker named Adhesi, with whom the artist had cohabitated. Sudjojono is quoted as having become a regular client of Adhesi after becoming interested in her life story, whereby she was forcibly married to a haji based in Cirebon, West Java, and fled to Jakarta. Sudjojono sought to marry Adhesi, to the point of taking her to meet his parents, and perceived himself as rescuing Adhesi—whom he called Miryam—as Jesus had rescued Mary Magdalene. However, Adhesi left Sudjojono when he was unable to provide a steady income, and her own earnings as a prostitute in Senen were greater than his earnings.

== Analysis ==
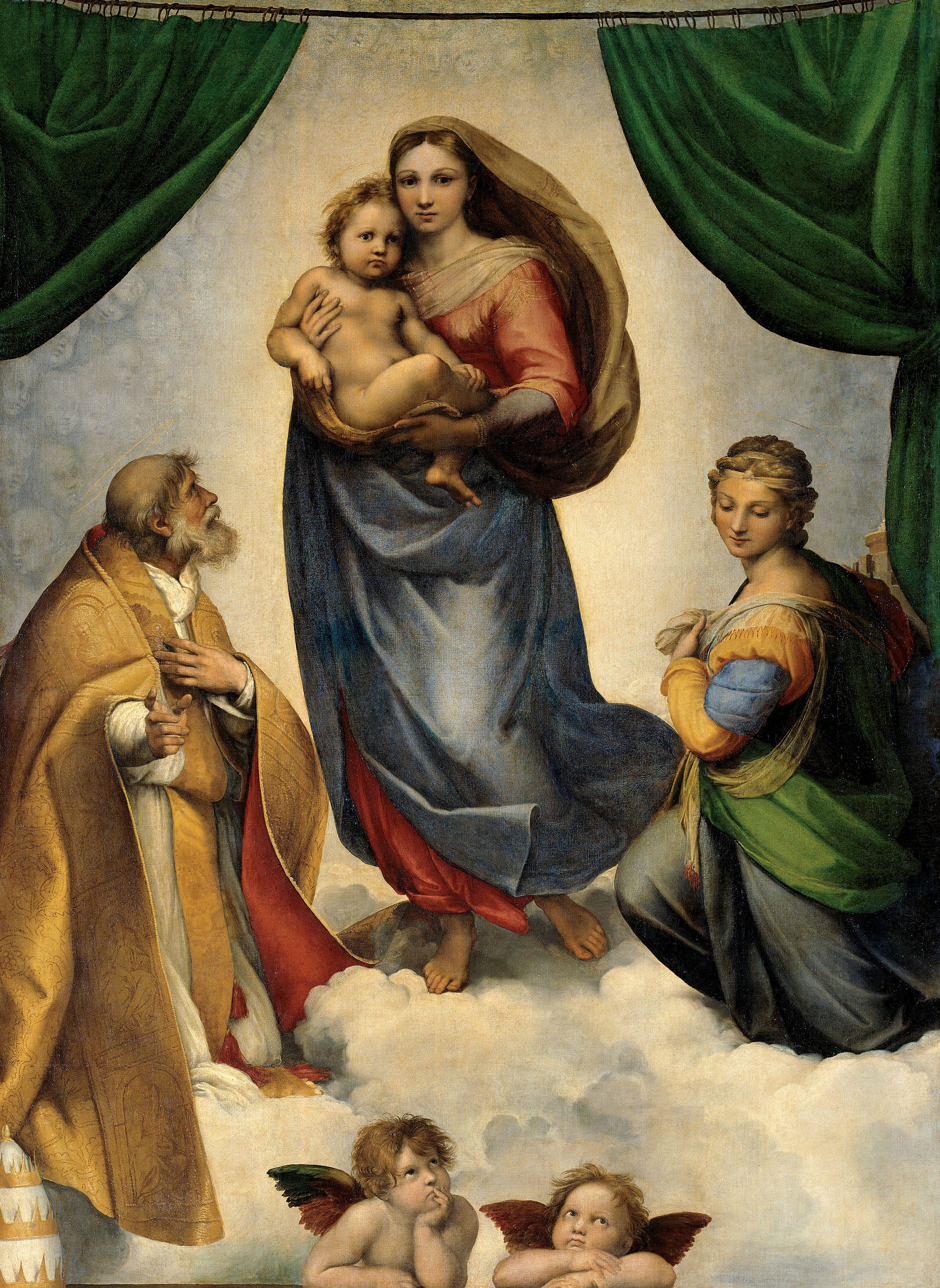
Similarities have been noted with Raphael's Sistine Madonna (1512) and Vincent van Gogh's La Mousmé (1888)

Writing for the Cabinet Secretariat, Kukuh Pamuji describes Di Depan Kelambu Terbuka as a critique of the suffering experienced by Indonesians under Dutch colonial rule. This conclusion is echoed by the Indonesian art critic Zuliati, who also highlights the work's presentation of social inequalities. Chua likewise highlights a defiance to Dutch control, though he links it to the increased regulation of prostitution. Siregar, meanwhile, contrasts the sitter's "distraught and uncomfortable" pose with the warmth expected of a woman in the bedroom, writing that Di Depan Kelambu Terbuka "may well be S. Sudjojono's erotic perception when recording the moment of separation – cold, quiet and flat".

Soon finds a "stylistic affinity" between Di Depan Kelambu Terbuka and Vincent van Gogh's La Mousmé (1888), though he notes that the sitter in Sudjojono's portrait appears "wizened and haggard" in comparison. Chua finds similarities in the framing of the subject in Di Depan Kelambu Terbuka and Raphael's Sistine Madonna (1512), though he argues that, unlike the earlier work, "everything about the painting refuses the transcendental, refuses the world beyond", instead emphasizing the "concrete presence" of the sitter.

== Legacy ==
Di Depan Kelambu Terbuka was purchased by Sukarno at an unknown date before 1948; as it survived the Indonesian National Revolution when many of Sukarno's later acquisitions were destroyed, it was likely acquired between 1940 and 1947. It remains in the collection of the Presidential Palace of Indonesia, being hung at the Bogor Palace as of 2015. The painting has also been exhibited outside the palace, such as during the exhibition 17/71: Goresan Juang Kemerdekaan (17/71: Battlelines of Freedom) in 2016.

The American art historian Claire Holt considers Di Depan Kelambu Terbuka one of Sudjojono's best, highlighting the contrast of the subject's tense expression with the fluffy mosquito netting as well as the work's use of colour. The Indonesian art historian Wulan Dirgantoro contrasts the work and its "unflattering" depiction of its subject and earlier paintings of exotic and beautiful women in the Mooi Indië genre, writing that this break from convention allowed the work to become "a clarion call for more truthful subject matter in Indonesian paintings". Siregar describes it as "one of the most iconic paintings of Indonesian modern art".

Di Depan Kelambu Terbuka has served as the basis for several other Indonesian artworks. The painting was reproduced by the Indonesian photographer Herra Pahlasari in a 2009 self-portrait. The artist also created a video with potential poses that Adhesi may have used. In 2018, the painter Moelyono exhibited a portrait of a ludruk dancer inspired by Sudjojono's work at Flinders University.

== Works cited ==
- Chua, Kevin (2018). "Courbet after Sudjojono". Art History. 41 (2): 292–317. doi:10.1111/1467-8365.12333.
- Dirgantoro, Wulan (2017). Feminisms and Contemporary Art in Indonesia: Defining Experiences. Amsterdam: Amsterdam University Press. pp. 77–118. doi:10.1017/9789048526994. ISBN 978-90-485-2699-4.
- Holt, Claire (1967). Art in Indonesia: Continuities and Change. Ithaca, New York: Cornell University Press. ISBN 978-0-8014-0188-6.
- Pamuji, Kukuh (22 May 2015). "Mengenal Koleksi Benda Seni Kenegaraan (Bag-7)" [Introducing the State Art Collection (Part 7)] (in Indonesian). Cabinet Secretariat of the Republic of Indonesia. Archived from the original on 14 June 2026.
- Pamuji, Kukuh (4 February 2019). "Kisah di Balik Lukisan: Di Depan Kelambu Terbuka" [Story Behind the Painting: Di Depan Kelambu Terbuka] (in Indonesian). Cabinet Secretariat of the Republic of Indonesia. Archived from the original on 17 June 2026.
- Siregar, Aminudin TH. "Herra Pahlasari". National Portrait Gallery. Archived from the original on 17 June 2026.
- Soon, Simon (2017). "The Woman and the Vista: Intimate Revolt of the Cultural Left". Charting Thoughts. National Gallery Singapore. pp. 202–213. doi:10.2307/j.ctv13xpr6k.19. ISBN 978-981-11-2865-3. JSTOR j.ctv13xpr6k.19.
- Susanto, Mikke; Zaelani, Rizki Akhmad (2016). 17/71: Goresan Juang Kemerdekaan: Pameran Koleksi Seni Rupa Istana Kepresidenan Republik Indonesia [17/71: Battlelines of Freedom: An Exhibit of the Artwork of the Presidential Palace of Indonesia] (in Indonesian). Jakarta: Ministry of the Secretariat of the Republic of Indonesia.
- Suyono, Seno Joko (15 October 2023). "Perlawanan Ludruk dalam Lukisan Moelyono" [The Struggle of Ludruk through the Paintings of Moelyono]. Tempo (in Indonesian). Archived from the original on 17 June 2026.
- Supangkat, Jim (2023). "A Brief History of Indonesian Modern Art". In Kent, Elly; Hooker, Virginia; Turner, Caroline (eds.). Living Art: Indonesian Artists Engage Politics, Society and History. Asian Studies. Vol. 17. Canberra: ANU Press. pp. 199–217. ISBN 978-1-76046-493-6.
- Yuliman, Sanento (2023). "New Indonesian Painting". In Kent, Elly; Hooker, Virginia; Turner, Caroline (eds.). Living Art: Indonesian Artists Engage Politics, Society and History. Asian Studies. Vol. 17. Translated by Kent, Elly. Canberra: ANU Press. pp. 109–144. ISBN 978-1-76046-493-6.
- Zuliati (2014). "Ikonografi Karya Sudjojono 'Di Depan Kelamboe Terboeka'" [The Iconography of Sudjojono's 'Di Depan Kelamboe Terboeka']. Journal of Urban Society's Arts (in Indonesian). 1 (1): 1–16. doi:10.24821/JOUSA.V1I1.784.
