= Young Artists of Indonesia =

Artist collective in Indonesia (active 1946–1965)

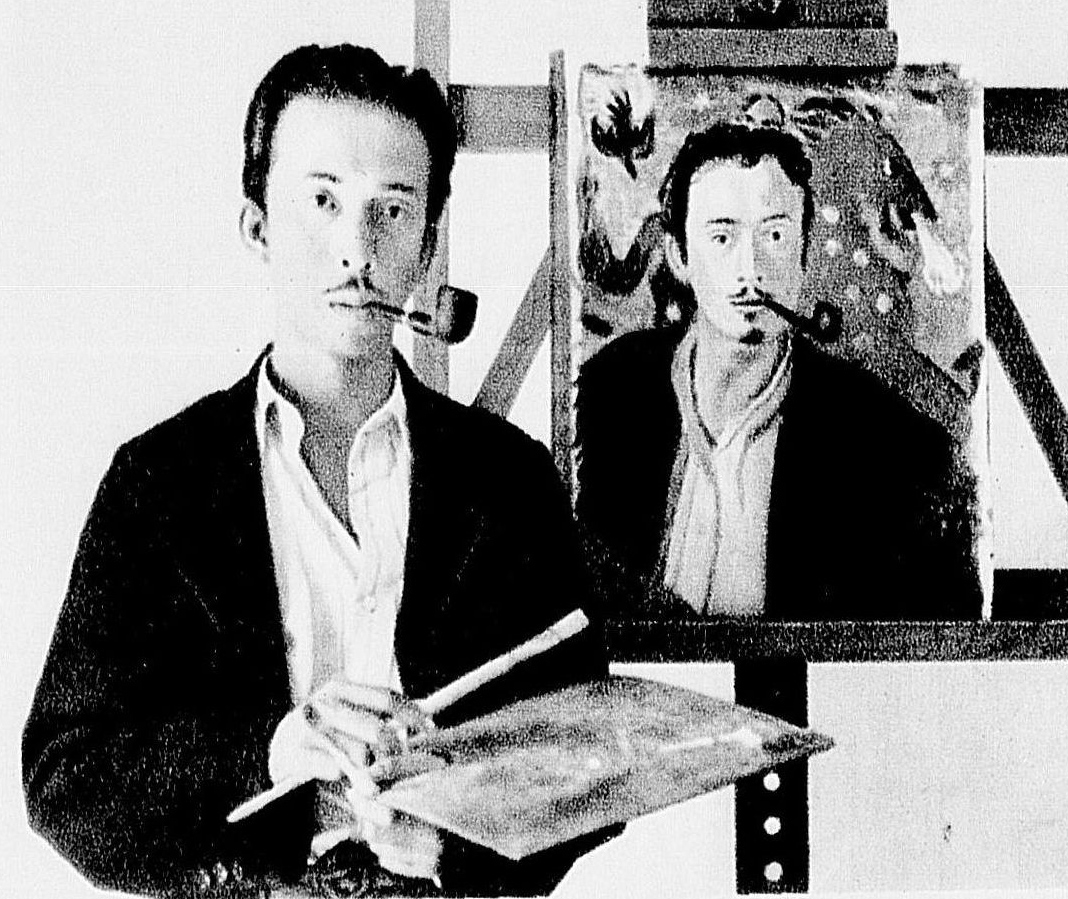
S. Sudjojono, the founder of the Young Artists of Indonesia, in 1943

Young Artists of Indonesia (Indonesian: Seniman Indonesia Muda), abbreviated SIM, was an artist collective (sanggar) active in Indonesia from 1946 until 1965. Established by S. Sudjojono as the cultural wing of the Indonesian Socialist Youth in Madiun, the collective moved several times during the Indonesian National Revolution, finally settling in Yogyakarta in 1948. Members came from diverse backgrounds, employed varied styles, and favoured different subjects, but generally promoted the nascent Indonesian nation through their art, often through a leftist lens. SIM had fallen from prominence by the mid-1950s, and after Sudjojono left the collective in 1959, many of its remaining members followed him. SIM continued to operate, later under the leadership of Sudjojono's former wife Mia Bustam, until 1965, when many of its members were captured during an anti-communist purge in the 1960s.

== History ==
SIM was established in 1946 during the Indonesian National Revolution. Its founder, S. Sudjojono, had previously co-founded the Indonesian Painters Association in the 1940s and worked with the Institute for People's Education and Cultural Guidance during the Japanese occupation. The collective was established in Madiun, East Java, and initially worked with the Indonesian Socialist Youth as its propaganda wing. As the revolution continued, SIM moved to Yogyakarta and Surakarta in Central Java. In the former city, it briefly combined with Seni Rupa Masyarakat (Plastic Arts of the People, SRM), a collective established by Affandi.

SIM and SRM separated in 1947. That year, SIM member Hendra Gunawan left the collective to establish Pelukis Rakjat (lit. 'Painters of the People') with Affandi. Gunawan is said to have left SIM over a dispute about subsidy allocation. Sudjojono advocated a model derived from that used in the Soviet Union, wherein artists were ranked based on their achievements, with higher ranked artists receiving a larger share of government subsidies. Gunawan, conversely, argued for a model wherein artists' subsidies were based solely on their marital status, with married artists receiving a larger share.

SIM held several exhibitions during this period. On 25 May 1947, during an exhibition in Yogyakarta, President Sukarno bought Sudjojono's painting Kawan-Kawan Revolusi (Friends of the Revolution) on credit; he only completed payment in 1949, after the artist visited him wearing a thread-bare shirt. Another 64 paintings by 25 artists were purchased by the Indonesian state at the same exhibition; the Indonesian art historian Amir Sidharta suggests that these may have included works by Affandi, Sudjojono, Henk Ngantung, and Barli Sasmitawinata. In 1948, SIM settled in Yogyakarta, occupying a space provided by Sultan Hamengkubuwana IX. SIM remained in Yogyakarta until its dissolution,

The American art critic Claire Holt writes that, by the mid-1950s, SIM had few distinguished members. She highlights Sudjojono, Harijadi Sumodidjojo, and Suromo Darpo Sawego, the last of whom was a teacher at the Indonesian Arts Academy. Later, SIM became less prominent in the Yogyakarta art scene, with the Amrus Natalsja-led and Communist Party of Indonesia (PKI)-affiliated Bumi Tarung (Arena) group on the vanguard. At the same time, SIM remained highly political, with Sudjojono representing the PKI in Indonesia's parliament from 1955 through 1959 and many of its members associated with the PKI-affiliated Institute of People's Culture (LEKRA).

Sudjojono left SIM in 1959, at which time he moved to Jakarta. Many of SIM's members also left the collective, and remaining members were disheartened. Mia Bustam, Sudjojono's former wife whom he had left for another woman, wrote to the remaining members, urging them to rededicate themselves to the people. As Mia developed herself as an artist, she gained support from the collective, ultimately becoming its leader from 1962 to 1963. Under her leadership, the artists purchased land north of Yogyakarta, which they attempted to convert into a shared workspace; however, due to rampant inflation as well as a detrimental financial arrangements with LEKRA, the workshop was never completed. In 1965, following a failed coup attempt by the 30 September Movement (Gerakan 30 September, or G30S) the preceding year, many of SIM's members were captured as part of an anti-communist purge and held as political prisoners. Mia, for example, was arrested on 23 November 1965, and detained without trial for thirteen years.

== Art ==
Members of SIM came from diverse backgrounds, employed varied styles, and favoured different subjects. During the revolution, members of SIM produced works of pro-Indonesian propaganda, which were distributed beyond the Van Mook line. It also published political cartoons in the newspaper Kedaulatan Rakyat. The Indonesian Museums Documentation Project describes SIM members as visual journalists, using their art to document events not available to photographers while simultaneously promoting an international image of Indonesia as a "sovereign, intellectual, and modern cultural entity". SIM continued to promote the Indonesian republic through its art into the 1960s.

== Notable members ==
- Basuki Resobowo
- Harijadi Sumodidjojo
- Hendra Gunawan
- Kartono Yudokusumo
- Mardian
- Mia Bustam
- Oesman Effendi
- Rusli
- S. Sudjojono (1946–1959)
- Suromo Darpo Sawego
- Trisno Sumardjo
- Trubus Sudarsono
- Zaini

== Works cited ==
- Chowdhury, Neel (24 July 2008). "Painter Laureate". Time. Archived from the original on 30 May 2026.
- Dirgantoro, Wulan (2017). Feminisms and Contemporary Art in Indonesia: Defining Experiences. Amsterdam: Amsterdam University Press. pp. 77–118. doi:10.1017/9789048526994. ISBN 978-90-485-2699-4.
- "Documenting Indonesia's Revolution through the Caricature Collection of Museum Joang '45". Indonesian Museums Documentation Project. 9 January 2026. Archived from the original on 14 June 2026.
- Holt, Claire (1967). Art in Indonesia: Continuities and Change. Ithaca, New York: Cornell University Press. ISBN 978-0-8014-0188-6.
- Lusandiana, Lisistrata (2020). "Dari Sanggar ke Kolektif: Perihal Iklim Komunal di Medan Sosial Seni Jogja" [From Sanggar to Collective: On the Communal Climate of the Social Field of Art in Yogyakarta] (PDF). Matajendela (in Indonesian). Vol. XV, no. 4. Yogyakarta. pp. 4–5. Archived from the original (PDF) on 14 June 2026.
- Pamuji, Kukuh (22 May 2015). "Mengenal Koleksi Benda Seni Kenegaraan (Bag-7)" [Introducing the State Art Collection (Part 7)] (in Indonesian). Secretariat of the Cabinet of the Republic of Indonesia. Archived from the original on 14 June 2026.
- Roosa, John (2006). Pretext for Mass Murder: The September 30th Movement and Suharto's Coup D'état in Indonesia. Madison: University of Wisconsin Press. ISBN 978-0-299-22030-3.
- Sidharta, Amir (7 October 2019). "Indonesian Art during the Revolutionary War: The Production and Circulation of Indonesian Modern Art (1945-1949)". Stedelijk Museum. Archived from the original on 14 June 2026.
