= Harijadi Sumodidjojo =

Indonesian painter (1919–1997)

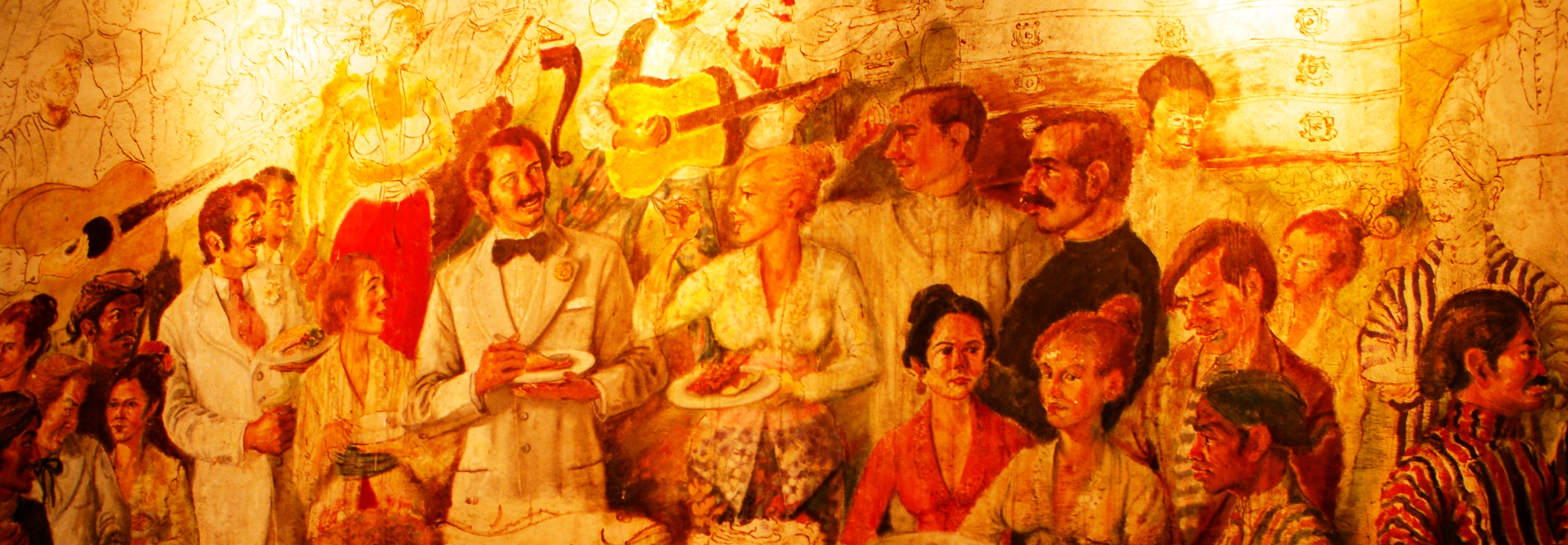
- Mural by Harijadi Sumodidjojo.
- Born: July 25, 1919
- Died: June 20, 1997 (aged 77)
- Occupations: Painter sculptor Carver

Harijadi Sumodidjojo (July 25, 1919 – June 3, 1997) was an Indonesian realist artist who lived during the revolutionary era. He was able to portray the physical form and thoughts of people in a way that could be enjoyed by the general public. Among his works are the paintings Awan Berarak Jalan Bersimpang and Biografi II di Malioboro (Biography II in Malioboro), Anak Tetangga Kita (Our Neighbor's Kid), a stone relief entitled Pesta Pura di Bali (Temple Party in Bali), and mural painted on the wall of the Jakarta History Museum. This 200 m^{2} unfinished mural, which portrays life in Batavia (now Jakarta) from 1880 to 1920. was hidden away in an ethnography room from 1974 until 2010 when a group of British and Indonesian historians came across it.

== Biography ==
Harijadi Sumodidjojo was born on July 25, 1919, in the village of, Purworejo Regency, Central Java. According to sources, his birth year was recorded as 1921 to allow him to join the students' army. His father was Samadi, an assistant teacher and headmaster of Ongko Loro School in Ketawangrejo. Samadi was well known as a lover of literature and traditional karawitan music, while his mother was Ngadikem binti Mansur, the daughter of a tobacco landlord in Jember, East Java.

=== Career ===
Before becoming a self-taught artist, Harijadi studied business. He started painting when he was working as movie poster maker. In 1940–1941, he worked as a commercial artist for a firm in Jakarta, and was well known as one of artists nurtured by the Young Artists of Indonesia (Seniman Indonesia Muda – SIM) organisation led by Sindoedarsono Soedjojono. To provide for his family, Harijadi also worked as a teacher in girls school.

During World War II, Harijadi worked for the Allies as a meteorologist and saw combat in Malaya and Sumatera. In 1949, he joined Brigade 17 of the (TNI) in the battle for Yogyakarta. He joined the Army as a Lieutenant 2nd class, but was soon promoted to Detachment Commander Engineer Brigade 17 for the South Kedu region.

Harijadi was one of the painters who was often invited by President Sukarno to discuss art.

In 1965, Sukarno sent Harijadi and another artist, Puranto Yapung, along with historians Drs Soemardjo and Drs Buchori to learn about museums in Mexico. They learned how to make dioramas from Mario Vasces, an expert in anthropology and museums who worked for the Mexican government. The purpose of this trip was so that the National Museum of Indonesia then under construction, could be filled with dioramas about Indonesian history. However, work was halted in 1965 by the coup attempt by the 30 September Movement after only five out of 30 planned dioramas had been completed done. In Mexico, Harijado also met Jose David Alvaro Siquiros, a mural artist and realist painter. He also became a member of the Organisacion International de Muralistos del Mundo in South America. His belief in Sukarno's nationalist ideology led to restrictions on his artistic freedom during the Indonesia New Order regime in power from 1968 to 1998 because during that era, people feared concepts associated with Sukarno. Until his end of life, he held firm to his principle of using his art for people and refusing to serve those in power.

=== Hobbies ===
Besides painting, Harijadi had an interest in automotives and racing. He participated in the Yogyakarta Motor Sport Association. In 1956, he came second in the Permi TT( Time Trial) Races class of 350 cc in Surabaya with his BSA Gold type Star. Until, the 1970s, he was active in the Indonesian Motor Association and worked as checker of machine authenticity every time a race was held at the Ancol circuit. His other hobbies were singing and writing poetry. In 1959, he acted in the Hartati theater directed by Subagio Sastrowardoyo. He also acted in the movies Badai Selatan (1960) and Nyoman Cinta Merah Putih (1989).
