= S. Sudjojono =

Indonesian artist (1913–1985)

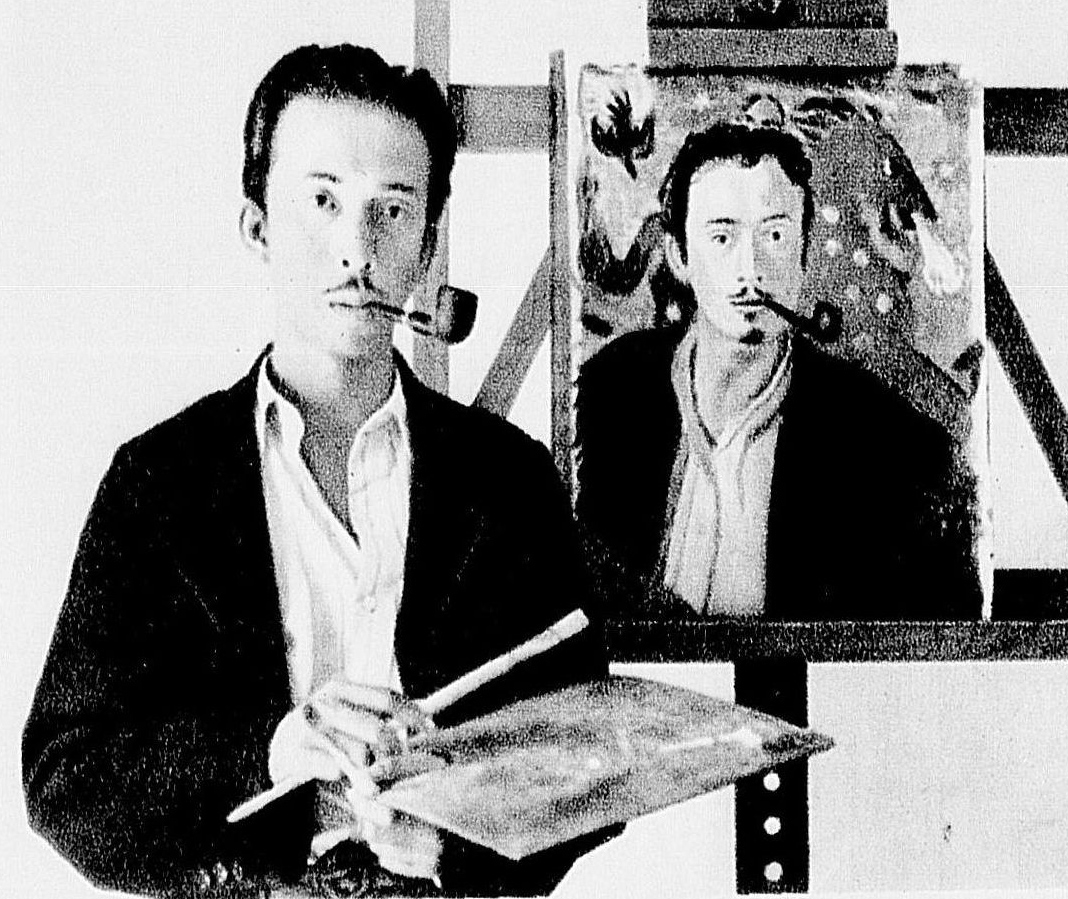
- Sudjojono, 1943
- Born: Sindudarsono Sudjojono; 1913; Kisaran, Dutch East Indies
- Died: 25 April 1986 (aged 72–73)
- Notable work: Di Depan Kelambu Terbuka
- Style: Socialist realism, Expressionism
- Spouse: Mia Bustam (1943–1959, divorced); Rose Pandanwangi (m. 1959)
- Relatives: Kartono Yudokusumo (adoptive brother)

Sindudarsono Sudjojono (1913 – 25 April 1986), more commonly known as S. Sudjojono, (Note: According to Sudjojono's son Tedjabayu, Sudjojono disliked the name Sindudarsono and insisted on abbreviating it (Afrida 2012).) was an Indonesian painter considered a "founder of the Indonesian modern art movement".

Born to a poor family in Kisaran, North Sumatra, Sudjojono was adopted by a teacher at a young age and provided schooling. Interested in art from his youth, in the 1920s he began to learn under established artists such as Mas Pirngadi. In the late 1930s, Sudjojono rejected the conventions of contemporary Indonesian painting—what he called "Beautiful Indies" (Mooi Indië)—in favour of a socialist realism that drew from European expressionism. He advocated this new style of painting through several organizations, including the Indonesian Painters Association (1938–1942) and Young Artists of Indonesia (1946–1959). Considered one of Indonesia's leading painters by the 1950s, Sudjojono was elected to parliament with the Communist Party of Indonesia in 1955 and was a member of the party's cultural wing. In 1958, however, he left the party over his extramarital affair with Rose Pandanwangi. In his later years, Sudjojono continued to paint. He wrote his memoirs in 1983, dying three years later to lung cancer.

Sudjojono experimented with different styles over the years, with his paintings from the 1950s putting greater emphasis on photorealism. His best received works are those produced from the 1930s through the 1940s, with the American art historian Claire Holt describing his later works as having lost "his freshness in form and feeling". His writings on art have been considered foundational in Indonesia's art canon. Works by Sudjojono have been exhibited extensively in Indonesia and in Singapore.

== Biography ==
=== Early life ===
Sudjojono was born in 1913 (Note: No official birthdate is available for Sudjojono (Simanjuntak 2017). Earlier sources tended to provide 1914 as his year of birth. Later sources have preferred 1913 (Supangkat 2023, p. 203). Some biographies provide 14 December 1917, which Sudjojono described as a date chosen by his wife because "he looked younger and healthier" than others his age (Simanjuntak 2017).) in Kisaran, North Sumatra, in the Dutch East Indies (now Indonesia). His parents were transplants from Java, and his father worked as a labourer at a plantation. (Note: Holt (1967, p. 329) writes that he was a labourer at a hospital on site.) He later recalled growing up "dirty and full of misery", with his father receiving less in wages than the ruling Dutch elite allocated to their dogs. He took up art at a young age, and was recognized for his intelligence, while at the same time contributing to his family's income by hunting wild boar. At the age of four or five, he was sent to live with another family, as his could no longer afford to feed him.

Sudjojono was adopted by Marsudi Yudhokusumo, (Note: This made him the adoptive brother of fellow artist Kartono Yudokusumo (Holt 1967, p. 329).) who sent him to a Dutch-run school for indigenous peoples. They moved to Batavia (now Jakarta) in 1925, where Sudjojono continued his education. Yudhokusumo also provided Sudjojono with access to works and discussions about philosophy and nationalism. At age 15, Sudjojono moved to Lembang, near Bandung, in West Java to attend a school for teachers, where he learned English as well as local and world history. This was followed by studies in Yogyakarta, where he attended a teachers' college operated by Taman Siswa. In his leisure time, he would frequently paint alongside fellow student Basuki Resobowo.

=== Painting and PERSAGI ===
Formal art education was limited in the Indies, and aspiring artists generally took an informal apprenticeship under established ones. Through his family connections, Sudjojono began studying under Mas Pirngadi by 1928. During this short apprenticeship, Pirngadi urged him against using "dirty colours" in his landscapes, instead prioritizing ochre with some whites and blues. He was also exposed to works by European modernists such as Vincent van Gogh, Paul Gauguin, Georges Braque, and Paul Cézanne through colonial exhibitions.

Although Sudjojono had exhibited works at the 1928 Youth Congress, he only began focusing on his art in mid-1930s. Sudjojono studied under the Japanese artist Chiyoji Yazaki in 1934 or 1935, and for a time was a follower of the academic artist Abdullah Suriosubroto. He spent time in Singapore, where he worked with J. Pieres at the Ceylon Studio, and upon returning to the Indies produced illustrations for newspapers such as Pikiran Rakyat. In 1937, Sudjojono participated in an exhibition alongside several European artists.

By the late 1930s, Sudjojono had become critical of the dominant art trends, the "Beautiful Indies" (Mooi Indië) style that he described as based around a "holy trinity" of mountains, coconut palms, and rice fields. Instead, he called for the rise of a "living artist" who depicted the "daily life transmuted by the artist himself who is immersed in it", rather than the beauties of antiquity or the "mental world of the tourist", and thereby emphasized reality and truth. Such an artist would learn from Western art techniques and philosophies as well as the diverse indigenous arts of the country's peoples; they would "turn to the West in order to go East". At the same time, the artist would be expected to maintain their individuality, rather than commit themselves exclusively to social mores and traditions.

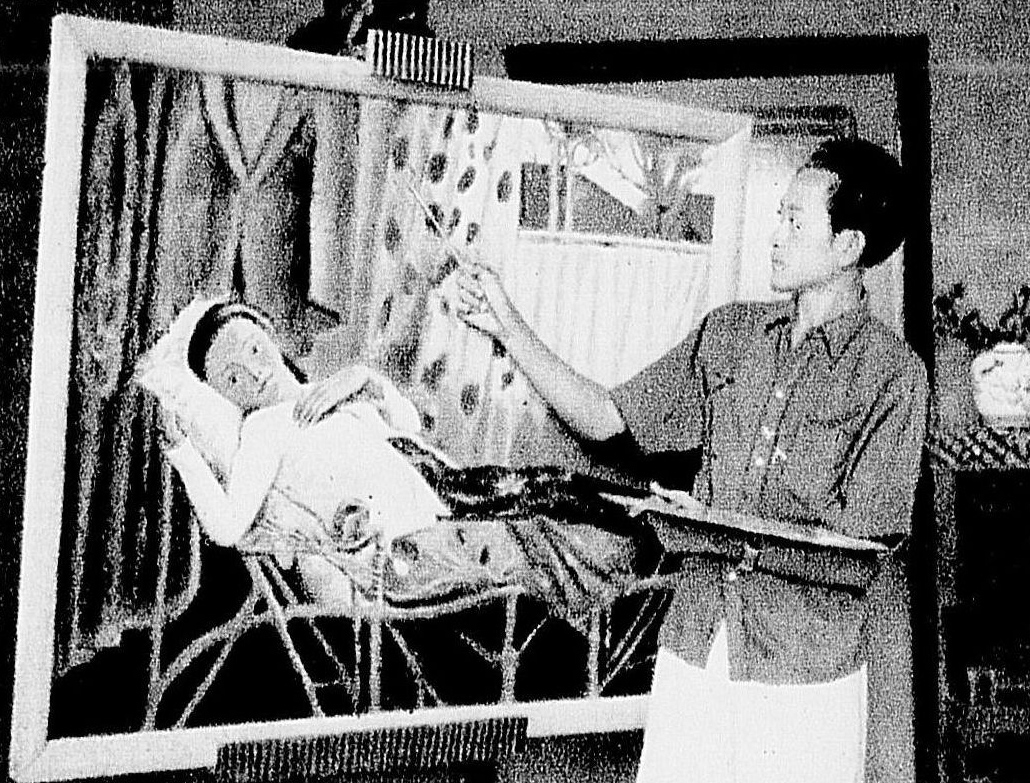
Agus Djaya, with whom Sudjojono established the Indonesian Painters Association

To advance this paradigm, which the art historian John Clark describes as "national expressionism", Sudjojono joined with like-minded artists such as Agus Djaya. On 23 October 1938, (Note: Some sources, such as Holt (1967, p. 197), give 1937.) they established the Indonesian Painters Association (Persatuan Ahli Gambar Indonesia; PERSAGI). This organization, which lasted for four years, eventually encompassed some 30 painters. Due to his articulate expressions Sudjojono was frequently perceived as their spokesperson, though he was reportedly uncomfortable with this label. Sudjojono participated in several exhibitions with PERSAGI. He was critical of the group's first show, held in 1940 at the Kolff bookstore, feeling that the artists had yet to distinguish themselves from the European stylings of their predecessors. The group held another exhibition in 1941 at the Kunstkring. Dutch critics were generally dismissive of the works' technical qualities, though the critic Velthuisen in De Java Bode praised their ability to capture the new spirit of modernism. During his time with PERSAGI, Sudjojono became recognized for his nationalistic style and approach.

=== Occupation and revolution ===
After the Japanese occupation of the Dutch East Indies in 1942, Sudjojono joined the Institute for People's Education and Cultural Guidance, a Japanese-established cultural organization that was used for propaganda purposes. In the art division, headed by Agus Djaya under the supervision of Kenji Yoshioka, Sudjojono and other artists had access to more resources as well as numerous exhibitions. Having continued to teach in the early years of his career, he resigned during the occupation.

During this period, Sudjojono regularly provided instruction to emerging artists, including Kusnadi, Trubus Sudarsono, and Zaini. He was also responsible, in conjunction with the painter Affandi, for the art department of the Center of the People's Power (Pusat Tenaga Rakyat; Poetera). In his personal life, Sudjojono married his first wife, later known as Mia Bustam, in 1943 over her family's objections; the couple would go on to have eight children.

By 1946, during the Indonesian National Revolution, Sudjojono was in Madiun, East Java, where he established the Young Artists of Indonesia (Seniman Indonesia Muda, SIM). The group, which moved to Surakarta in 1947 and Yogyakarta in 1948, produced numerous works of anti-Dutch and pro-Indonesian propaganda. It remained active through the 1960s, with Sudjojono its leader until 1959. During this period, Sudjojono continued to advocate against the Mooi Indië style, writing in 1946, "Painters of Indonesia! If there is still any of your own blood in your breast [...] leave your tourist-like sphere, break the chains that restrain the freedom of your blood."

During the revolution, many of Sudjojono's paintings vanished, and he recalled one of his sculptures being used by Dutch soldiers for target practice. Sudjojono's son Tedjabayu estimated that some 45 of his paintings had been destroyed by the Dutch. Outside of the art world, Sudjojono participated in the physical struggle against the returning Dutch forces. He recalled that, as an armed revolutionary, he witnessed acts of heroism and torture, which he later sought to reflect in his work.

=== Later years ===
A member of the Communist Party of Indonesia (Partai Komunis Indonesia, PKI) since 1937, Sudjojono joined the Institute for People's Culture (Lembaga Kebudajaan Rakjat, LEKRA)—the party's cultural office—in the 1950s. Arguing that reality for Indonesians was "the reality of rice", he became a leading figure in the institute. In the 1955 legislative election, he was elected to parliament as a PKI representative, and thus travelled frequently between the family home in Yogyakarta and the capital in Jakarta. During this period, Sudjojono continued to paint. He also took several students, including Maria Tjui.

Having established a personal friendship with President Sukarno, Sudjojono received several government commissions. He also toured Europe with government funding, including a 1951 trip to East Germany, Romania, and the Soviet Union. During one such trip, he began an affair with the music student Rose Pandanwangi, who was already married. In 1958, after Mia rejected his proposal for a polygamous marriage, Sudjojono separated from his wife, intending to marry Rose. When the PKI threatened to expel him for besmirching its moral image, in 1958 Sudjojono left the party and his government position. This also resulted in him losing his government patronage, and thus Rose—whom he married in 1959—became the family's primary source of income.

After the rise of President Suharto in 1965, which was followed by a purge of communists, Sudjojono avoided violence by virtue of having left the PKI. (Note: Although Sudjojono avoided the purge, his son Tedjabayu and his first wife were held prisoner. Tedjabayu was held in a prison camp on Buru Island, while Mia spent time at various women's prisons (Afrida 2012).) Sudjojono began to experiment with new styles, as well as write poetry, including works based on his paintings and inspired by Rose. In 1975, his earlier nationalist style was embraced by the Indonesian New Art Movement (Gerakan Seni Rupa Baru Indonesia).

In 1984, Sudjojono and eight of his students held an exhibition at Balai Budaya Jakarta. Writing in Tempo, the art critic Bambang Bujono wrote that, although Sudjojono's works maintained traces of his earlier style, they were no longer as fresh as paintings such as Di Depan Kelambu Terbuka. Sudjojono died of complications from lung cancer on 25 April 1986. In September of that year, the Duta Fine Arts Gallery in Jakarta held a retrospective exhibition featuring 109 works dating from 1937 to 1986.

== Art ==
Di Depan Kelambu Terbuka (1939), considered one of Sudjojono's best works

Sudjojono's style shifted over time. In his earlier works, his approach to art followed the tenets of socialist realism, at first with expressionist influences. In a 1939 article, he wrote that artists should "not only paint peaceful shelters in the rice fields and the blue mountains ... [but] also draw the sugar factories and the scrawny farmers, the motorcars of the rich and the trousers of the youth ... This is our existence, this is our reality. And painting [...] breathes this reality. Works during this period were characterized by heavy brushstrokes and "highly emotional". Generally, he did not identify his sitters by name, though he was known to have painted Mia several times.

Several scholars, including the American art historian Claire Holt, have highlighted Sudjojono's Di Depan Kelambu Terbuka (Before the Open Mosquito Net, 1939) as among the best examples of Indonesian modernism. Depicting a woman dressed in a kebaya and sarong sitting tensely in front of curlicue ironwork, the painting is described by the Indonesian art historian Wulan Dirgantoro as "a major turn from the established genre and a clarion call for more truthful subject matter in Indonesian paintings". She contrasts the work's unflattering frankness with the exotic and beautiful depictions of women in earlier Indonesian paintings.

In 1945, Sudjojono began urging Indonesian artists to "go to realism", and developed a photorealistic emphasis on detail. Such realism, he wrote, allowed the artist to "bring to light a more truthful, everyday image of Indonesians". The art critic Sanento Yuliman notes that Sudjojono's works completed after 1945 placed greater emphasis on volume and mass, as well as the interplay of light and shadow. In his writings, Sudjojono emphasized political consciousness, citing Pablo Picasso and Diego Rivera as prime examples of artists dedicated to achieving social justice, and called for art to reveal the "visible soul" (jiwa ketok).

Towards the end of his life, Sudjojono again embraced an expressionist approach, putting less emphasis on photorealistic depictions and objective observations. In his later career, Sudjojono's favoured subjects were landscapes, nudes, and still-lifes, though these were less popular with art-lovers. Several of his paintings depicted Rose, frequently dressed in a blouse and skirt, performing music or resting. Some of these works went beyond the physically observable, presenting fantastic scenes. Writing in the Routledge Encyclopedia of Modernism, Matt Cox describes Sudjojono's later works as more focused on introspection and contemplation. The historian Onghokham, meanwhile, describes them as little different from the Mooi Indië style Sudjojono had criticized.

== Legacy ==
As early as the 1950s, Sudjojono was considered one of Indonesia's leading painters, along with Affandi and Hendra Gunawan. He has subsequently been described as the "founder of the Indonesian modern art movement". (Note: Regarding claims that Sudjojono was the father of Indonesian art, Supangkat (2000) emphasized that European forms of art had existed well before Sudjojono became active.) This epithet has also been given to Agus Djaya and Hendra Gunawan. However, according to Dirgantoro, Sudjojono is distinguished from these contemporaries through "his articulation of views and thoughts on Indonesian art and nationalism". His writings, particularly the essays compiled in Seniloekis Kesenian dan Seniman (Painting, Art and Artists, 1946), have been considered core texts for Indonesian artists and art theorists.

Sabrina Binte Hardy of the Centre for Research on Islamic and Malay Affairs writes that Sudjojono has been placed "on a pedestal of heroic levels", having risen from poverty to "change the course of Indonesian art forever" as the "face of the space between nationalism and culture". Similarly, Cox describes Sudjojono as having been "valorized within post-colonial narratives" due to the hardships of his early life and association with the nationalist and independence movements. Yuliman attributes the second generation of modern Indonesia art to Sudjojono's work. (Note: The first generation is attributed to Raden Saleh and others who embraced Romanticism (Dirgantoro 2017, p. 43).)

Assessments have focused primarily on Sudjojono's early works. Writing in 1967, Holt described Sudjojono's early paintings as his best, arguing that, as his style became more photographic in the 1950s, "his freshness in form and feeling were lost". A similar view was expressed by Sumardjo, who argued that, in his emphasis on photorealism, Sudjojono forgot the possibility of embedding emotions in his works. Cox writes that Sudjojono's greatest influence was through his art criticism and activism, and Dirgantoro describes his early writings as his strongest. In 2014, Sudjojono's Pasukan Kita yang Dipimpin Pangeran Diponegoro (Our Soldiers under the Leadership of Prince Diponegoro), a depiction of Diponegoro at the Battle of Kejiwan, sold for HK$58.36 million (US$7.53 million) at Sotheby's Hong Kong; at the time, it was the highest price attained by an Indonesian painting.

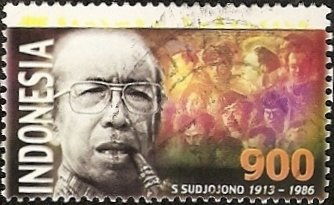
Sudjojono on a stamp issued by Pos Indonesia in 2000

In 1999, Sudjojono's works were included in Modernitas Indonesia dalam Representasi Seni Rupa (Indonesian Modernity as Represented by Art), the inaugural exhibition of the National Gallery of Indonesia. In 2008, the Museum of the Centre for the Arts at the National University of Singapore held a retrospective exhibition that focused on Sudjojono while also presenting works inspired by him. (Note: Titled "Strategies Towards the Real: S. Sudjojono and Contemporary Indonesian Art", the exhibition also included works by Nyoman Masriadi, Agus Suwage, and Rudi Mantofani (Chowdhury 2008). Dirgantoro (2017, p. 63) describes it as part of a broader movement towards reinterpreting Sudjojono's visions.) Several other exhibitions of Sudjojono's works have been curated in Singapore. (Note: The painting Kami Present, Ibu Pertiwi (Stand Guard for our Motherland) is held by the UOB Southeast Asia Gallery at the National Gallery Singapore (Binte Hardy 2026).) In Indonesia, exhibitions focused on Sudjojono's works have included Jiwa Ketok dan Kebangsaan: S. Sudjojono, PERSAGI dan Kita (Visible Soul and Nation: S. Sudjojono, PERSAGI, and Us, 2013) at the National Gallery of Indonesia and Seabad Sudjojono (A Century of Sudjojono, 2013) at the Rumah Topeng dan Wayang Setia Darma in Ubud, Bali.

In 2006, Mia Bustam published a memoir titled Sudjojono dan Aku (Sudjojono and Me). Focusing on their sixteen years of marriage and including chapters from their children, the book was highly critical of Sudjojono. In 2017, Sudjojono's autobiography Cerita tentang Saya dan Orang-orang Sekitar Saya (A Story about Me and the People around Me)—written in 1983—was published by Kepustakaan Populer Gramedia. It was paired with a biography of Rose by Sori Siregar titled Kisah Mawar Pandanwangi (The Story of Rose Pandanwangi). Publication rights to Sudjojono's paintings are held by the Sudjojono Centre, which was established by his family to promote the arts in Indonesia. As of 2018, it is headed by Sudjojono's daughter Maya.

== Works cited ==
- Afrida, Nani (30 May 2012). "The Style is Not Father's: Sudjojono's Son". The Jakarta Post. Archived from the original on 15 June 2024.
- "Basuki Resobowo" (in Indonesian). Taman Ismail Marzuki. Archived from the original on 4 April 2015.
- Binte Hardy, Sabrina (30 April 2026). "Historicising the Artist: An Exploration of S. Sudjojono". The Karyawan. AMP Singapore. Archived from the original on 30 May 2026.
- Bujono, Bambang (21 January 1984). "S. Sujoyono 1984 Pameran di Balai Budaya" [S. Sujoyono 1984 Exhibition at Balai Budaya]. Tempo (in Indonesian). Vol. 13, no. 47. p. 58.
- Chowdhury, Neel (24 July 2008). "Painter Laureate". Time. Archived from the original on 30 May 2026.
- Clark, John (1998). Modern Asian Art. Honolulu: University of Hawaii Press. ISBN 978-0-8248-2142-5.
- Cox, Matt (9 May 2016). "Sudjojono, Sindudarsono (1913–1986)". Routledge Encyclopedia of Modernism. doi:10.4324/9781135000356-REM913-1. ISBN 978-1-135-00035-6.
- Dirgantoro, Wulan (2017). Feminisms and Contemporary Art in Indonesia: Defining Experiences. Amsterdam: Amsterdam University Press. pp. 77–118. doi:10.1017/9789048526994. ISBN 978-90-485-2699-4.
- Holt, Claire (1967). Art in Indonesia: Continuities and Change. Ithaca, New York: Cornell University Press. ISBN 978-0-8014-0188-6.
- Kent, Elly (2023). "Artistic Ideologies: Individual and Society in Indonesian Art". In Kent, Elly; Hooker, Virginia; Turner, Caroline (eds.). Living Art: Indonesian Artists Engage Politics, Society and History. Asian Studies. Vol. 17. Canberra: ANU Press. pp. 83–108. ISBN 978-1-76046-493-6.
- "Saat Diponegoro Mengguncang Sotheby's" [When Diponegoro Shook Sotheby's]. Tempo (in Indonesian). 21 April 2014. Archived from the original on 30 May 2026.
- Sambrani, Chaitanya (2016). "PERSAGI (Persatuan Ahli-Ahli Gambar Indonesia)". Routledge Encyclopedia of Modernism. doi:10.4324/9781135000356-REM895-1. ISBN 978-1-135-00035-6.
- Simanjuntak, Tertiani (9 June 2017). "Djon and Rose, a Love Story". The Jakarta Post. Archived from the original on 26 August 2017.
- Sumardjo, Trisno (20 May 1950). "Realisme Sudjojono" [Sudjojono's Realism]. Mimbar Indonesia (in Indonesian). No. 20. pp. 21–23.
- Supangkat, Jim (9 January 2000). "Sudjojono Sang Perintis" [Sudjojono the Pioneer]. Tempo (in Indonesian).
- Supangkat, Jim (2023). "A Brief History of Indonesian Modern Art". In Kent, Elly; Hooker, Virginia; Turner, Caroline (eds.). Living Art: Indonesian Artists Engage Politics, Society and History. Asian Studies. Vol. 17. Canberra: ANU Press. pp. 199–217. ISBN 978-1-76046-493-6.
- Wira, Ni Nyoman (15 December 2018). "'Hey Djon' Highlights S. Sudjojono's Poems". The Jakarta Post. Archived from the original on 25 December 2022.
- Yuliman, Sanento (20 September 1986). "Mengenang Sujoyono: Dari Jiwa ... Mengenang, Dari Jiwa Yang Tampak" [Remembering Sujoyono: From the Soul ... Remembering, from the Visible Soul] (in Indonesian). Vol. 16, no. 30. p. 61.
- Yuliman, Sanento (2023). "New Indonesian Painting". In Kent, Elly; Hooker, Virginia; Turner, Caroline (eds.). Living Art: Indonesian Artists Engage Politics, Society and History. Asian Studies. Vol. 17. Translated by Kent, Elly. Canberra: ANU Press. pp. 109–144. ISBN 978-1-76046-493-6.
