= Mia Bustam =

Indonesian painter (1920–2011)

- Self-Portrait, 1959; black-and-white photograph of a lost painting
- Born: 4 June 1920; Purwodadi, Dutch East Indies
- Died: 2 January 2011 (aged 90); Depok, Indonesia
- Spouse: S. Sudjojono

Mia Bustam (4 June 1920 – 2 January 2011) was an Indonesian painter, activist, and memoirist. The daughter of a minor nobleman, Mia was educated to be a kindergarten teacher but left school after her father lost his job. In 1943, she met and married the painter S. Sudjojono, with whom she had eight children. After the couple divorced in 1959, Mia took up painting, joining the Young Artists of Indonesia as well as the communist-aligned Institute for People's Culture. Her works were well received, with her style likened to that of her former husband.

During the tumultuous period that followed the 30 September Movement coup, which was blamed on the Communist Party of Indonesia, Mia was arrested and held without trial. Over the course of thirteen years, she was detained at a series of prisons where she faced psychological abuse. After her release in 1978, she sought to restore the reputations of herself and other former detainees. She published four memoirs, including two posthumously. Most of her paintings are lost, and in the Indonesian art canon she is recalled primarily as Sudjojono's first wife.

== Biography ==
=== Early life and marriage ===
Mia was born on 4 June 1920 in Purwodadi on the island of Java in the Dutch East Indies (now Indonesia). Sources differ on her birth name. The Indonesian art Wulan Dirgantoro critic gives her full name Fransiska Emanuela Sasmiati, also rendered Sasmiya Sasmojo. The translator and feminist critic Astrid Reza, meanwhile, provides Sasmiyati Sri Mojoretno. In its obituary, the Indonesian magazine Tempo simply gives Sasmiati.

The daughter of Raden Ngabehi Sasmojo, a minor nobleman from central Java, Mia lived with her family in a small pavilion near the Kunstkring Building in Batavia (now Jakarta). In her youth, she learned several languages, being a student of an Europeesche Lagere School (European Primary School). In 1933 she began studying at the Van Deventer School to become a kindergarten teacher, but dropped out in 1936, after her father lost his job.

In 1943, Mia met the painter S. Sudjojono at the Kuntskring. Sudjojono, then a member of the Institute for People's Education and Cultural Guidance, had earlier built a reputation as a co-founder and spokesperson for the Indonesian Painters Association (Persatuan Ahli Gambar Indonesia; PERSAGI). Due to class differences—Sudjojono was the son of a poor migrant worker—her family opposed the relationship. Nonetheless, they married in 1943. During the Indonesian National Revolution, which lasted from 1945 until 1949, Mia and Sujojono moved several times, from Jakarta to Pati to Surakarta. By the 1950s, the couple were living in Yogyakarta.

Sudjojono travelled Europe in the 1950s, at which time he met and began an extramarital affair with the music student Rose Pandanwangi. Mia learned of the affair in 1956, after discovering a woman's handkerchief in Sudjojono's pocket. Although Sudjojono initially denied the affair, he ultimately acknowledged it and asked Mia to permit him a polygamous relationship. Mia refused, and the couple were separated in 1958. Their divorce was finalized the following year, and although Sudjojono—who had moved to Jakarta—remained in contact, Mia recalled that he often broke his promises. Mia thus became the single mother of eight children: five sons and three daughters.

=== Painting ===
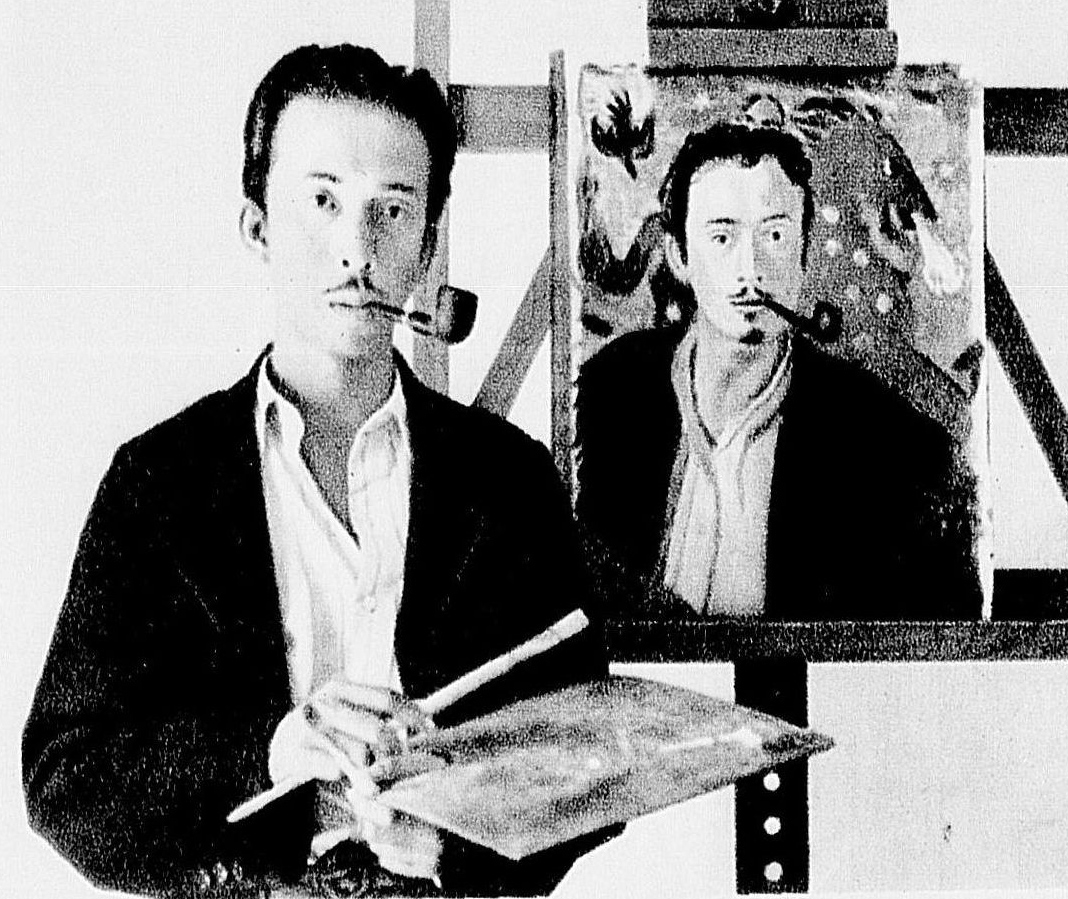
Mia's former husband S. Sudjojono in 1943

After her divorce, Mia took up painting under the pseudonym Mia Bustam. Mia was an abbreviated form of Sasmiati, while Bustam referred to Bustaman, her trah (family line). She produced a series of sketches of her children, and completed a self-portrait, and began work on a family portrait. In her memoirs, Mia later recalled that Sudjojno had previously encouraged her to draw, though she claimed no formal training. In her memoirs, Mia recalled being surprised by the positive responses from her colleagues, but over time gaining confidence through continued practice. Regarding her experiences with a still life, she wrote:

I plucked the desemberbol from the garden and I planted it in that pot. I arranged the cover of the altar in curvy shapes, I placed the pot above it, [then] I started to paint. I finished it in three days. It was good, it appeared to be three-dimensional, not flat. I began to feel confident and my brushstrokes became more solid.

Mia joined the Young Artists of Indonesia (Seniman Indonesia Muda, SIM), a nationalist art group that had been headed by Sudjojono until 1959. Recognizing that the collective was dispirited, she called for greater unity, and went on to formally lead SIM from 1962 through 1963. In this capacity, she oversaw the purchase of 2,000 square metres (22,000 sq ft) of land north of Yogyakarta, which was used as a workshop. Mia and the children also made their home there.

Mia also joined the Yogyakarta branch of the Institute for People's Culture (Lembaga Kebudajaan Rakjat, LEKRA), the cultural branch of the Communist Party of Indonesia (Partai Komunis Indonesia, PKI). She had previously dealt with the party through Sudjojono, who had represented the PKI in parliament from 1955 to 1959, and her attendance at the group's first congress in 1959 had been noted by senior leadership. Through LEKRA, Mia enrolled at the People's University and participated in the Revolutionary Literature and Arts Conference of 1964, and was asked to complete portraits of Karl Marx and Friedrich Engels. She was also a member of the agency for Indonesia–Soviet Union relations. Her LEKRA membership ultimately resulted in Mia spending thirteen years in prison without trial.

=== Imprisonment ===
In September 1965, a coup was undertaken by a group identifying itself as the 30 September Movement (Gerakan 30 September, or G30S). In the aftermath, President Sukarno was replaced by General Suharto as President of Indonesia. Suharto blamed the coup on the PKI, and the years that followed were marked by a tumultuous transition in which hundreds of thousands were killed. As a LEKRA member, Mia was captured on 23 November 1965, as were several other SIM members and students. (Note: Her eldest son, Tedjabayu, had been captured on 20 October (Dirgantoro 2017, p. 111). Sudjojono, who had left the PKI after the divorce, avoided violence and detention (Chowdhury 2008).)

After a series of interrogations, during which she recalled knives being thrown at her, Mia was detained at a series of prison camps. She was transferred no less than six times. Shortly after her detention, she was held at Fort Vredeburg in Yogyakarta. Beginning in 1966, she spent five years at the Wirogunan Prison in Yogyakarta. She was transferred in 1971 to the Plantungan concentration camp, near Kendal, and later sent to the Bulu Prison in Semarang. Mia later recalled experiencing extensive psychological abuse, including threats and verbal abuse. (Note: Although other texts on the experiences of women detainees include extensive discussion of the physical and sexual abuse experienced, Mia's memoir included only a few examples (Dirgantoro 2017, p. 112).) Detainees were involved in various activities, including gardening and making crafts for sale. Mia and other detainees also participated in choirs and other performance arts, which she later wrote helped them navigate the frustrations and despair of prison life.

Due to her previous experience, Mia was frequently tasked with set and costume design. She was also made to paint unpaid commissions by the prison wardens. In Wirogunan, she painted a jasmine that had grown in the prison yard. Later, in Plantungan, she completed a landscape depicting the prison grounds. In both instances, she excluded the barbed wire that surrounded her. Other works completed during this period included portraits of a mediating woman and Werdoyo Deksono, as well as an embroidery that depicted an imaginary meeting with her grandchildren.

=== Later life and death ===
Mia was released on 27 July 1978. She moved to Depok, where she took a variety of jobs to support herself. Due to the stigma against former detainees, she often used a pseudonym; this stigma also prevented her from continuing her artistic career. Rejecting the claim that she had been a PKI member, she also established an organization for former detainees, which campaigned to restore their reputations.

In the 2000s, Mia published two memoirs. The first, published in 2006, was titled Sudjojono dan Aku (Sudjojono and Me) and dealt with her relationship with Sudjojono between 1941 and 1958. Reviews of the memoir, which was initially intended for distribution within the family, focused primarily on its representation of Sudjojono. The second, published two years later, was titled Dari Kamp ke Kamp: Cerita Seorang Perempuan (From Camp to Camp: Story of a Woman) and focused on her experiences from 1958 to 1978. Yvonne Low of the University of Sydney describes these memoirs as chronicling "in rich textual depth and description the highs and lows of her life".

Mia died on 2 January 2011. In 2022, Mia's first memoirs were reissued by Penerbit Ultimatus. Two memoirs were published posthumously, Kelindan Asa dan Kenyataan (The Entanglement of Hope and Reality, 2022) and Mutiara Kisah Masa Lalu (Pearls of Stories from the Past, 2024). The former explored Mia's experiences from her liberation until her death, while the latter provided highlights from throughout her life. An English-language translation of a chapter from Sudjojono dan Aku by Astrid Reza was published in 2021.

== Art and legacy ==
Mia's paintings were primarily portraits and still lifes, often with a domestic setting. Her style was similar to that of Sudjojono, such that she recalled her colleague Marah Djilal confusing her family portrait with a work by her former husband. At the same time, the Indonesian art critic Wulan Dirgantoro writes that Mia distinguished herself by giving agency to her female subjects rather than reducing them to objects or ideals, as well as by avoiding explicitly political symbolism. Although she desired a solo exhibition, Mia had none during her lifetime.

Most of Mia's works have been lost, in part due to the tumultuous transition from the Sukarno to the Suharto eras. Her self-portrait completed in 1959, for example, had been exhibited at the PKI's offices in Jakarta after touring the Eastern Bloc as part of an exhibit; the painting was destroyed when the offices were razed in 1965, and survives only as a black-and-white photograph produced by Djilal. Dirgantoro writes that Mia's only surviving work is an incomplete family portrait, which had hung in her house. Sketches and an embroidery have also survived.

Dirgantoro notes that Mia's artistic career has received little academic exploration. Ultimately, Mia is best remembered as the first wife of Sudjojono, who is celebrated in the Indonesian art canon as the "father of Indonesian modern art". Low attributes Mia's absence in the history of Indonesian art to the gendered expectations under which she operated, whereby women were expected to "uphold the traditional and familial values of society", as well as the artist's leftist politics.

Mia and her story have been presented in other art forms. In 2022, a retelling of her life was staged at the Goethe Haus in Jakarta. Titled Sulaman Harapan Perempuan (The Woven Hopes of a Woman), the dramatic monologue starred Pipien Putri as Mia. In 2025, an exhibition dedicated to Mia was organized by her children at the Fort Vredeburg Museum in Yogyakarta. It included surviving photographs, writings, and sketches and paintings, as well as works dedicated to Mia by other artists.

== Works cited ==
- Bujono, Bambang (16 January 2011). "Akhirnya Kebenaran akan Berbicara" [Finally Truth will Speak]. Tempo (in Indonesian). Vol. 46, no. 39. p. 102.
- Bustam, Mia (2021). "Chapter 6: I Found Myself". Southeast of Now: Directions in Contemporary and Modern Art in Asia. 5 (1–2). Translated by Reza, Astrid: 339–349. doi:10.1353/sen.2021.0011.
- Chowdhury, Neel (24 July 2008). "Painter Laureate". Time. Archived from the original on 30 May 2026.
- Cox, Matt (9 May 2016). "Sudjojono, Sindudarsono (1913–1986)". Routledge Encyclopedia of Modernism. doi:10.4324/9781135000356-REM913-1. ISBN 978-1-135-00035-6.
- Dirgantoro, Wulan (2017). Feminisms and Contemporary Art in Indonesia: Defining Experiences. Amsterdam: Amsterdam University Press. pp. 77–118. doi:10.1017/9789048526994. ISBN 978-90-485-2699-4.
- Low, Yvonne (2021a). "Mia Bustam and Her Memoirs: Speaking for Herself". Southeast of Now: Directions in Contemporary and Modern Art in Asia. 5 (1–2): 335–338. doi:10.1353/sen.2021.0010.
- Low, Yvonne (2021b). "Interview with Astrid Reza". Southeast of Now: Directions in Contemporary and Modern Art in Asia. 5 (1–2): 351–356. doi:10.1353/sen.2021.0012.
- Maharani, Shinta (11 November 2025). "Arsip Langka Seniman Lekra Mia Bustam" [A Rare Archive of Works by Lekra Artist Mia Bustam]. Tempo (in Indonesian).
- Reliubun, Ihsan (10 December 2024). "Memoar Keempat Mia Bustam: Gambaran Perempuan Tangguh" [The Fourth Memoir of Mia Bustam: A Portrait of a Strong Woman]. Tempo. Archived from the original on 6 June 2026.
- Reza, Astrid (2025). "Mia Bustam (Sasmiyati Sri Mojoretno)". Archives of Women Artists, Research, and Exhibitions. Centre Pompidou. Archived from the original on 6 June 2026.
- Roosa, John (2006). Pretext for Mass Murder: The September 30th Movement and Suharto's Coup D'état in Indonesia. Madison: University of Wisconsin Press. ISBN 978-0-299-22030-3.
- Ricklefs, M. C. (1993). A History of Modern Indonesia since c.1300 (2nd ed.). Hampshire: Macmillan. ISBN 978-0-333-57689-2.
- Wibisana, Chris (1 September 2022). "Mia Bustam & Sudjojono: Mesra Kala Revolusi, Berakhir di Masa Damai" [Mia Bustam & Sudjojono: Intimate during the Revolution, Ended during the Peace]. tirto.id (in Indonesian). Archived from the original on 6 June 2026.
