= Citra Sasmita =

Indonesian artist (born 1990)

Citra Sasmita (born 1990) is an Indonesian artist. A self-taught artist, she started off as an illustrator for the Bali Post, before expanding into painting, sculpture ad installation. She is best known for her use of Kamasan, a painting technique from eastern Bali that is traditionally used to narrate Hindu epics. Her work has been exhibited in Europe and the USA, among them a solo show at the Barbican Centre in London in 2025.
