= Trisno Sumardjo =

Indonesian writer (1916–1969)

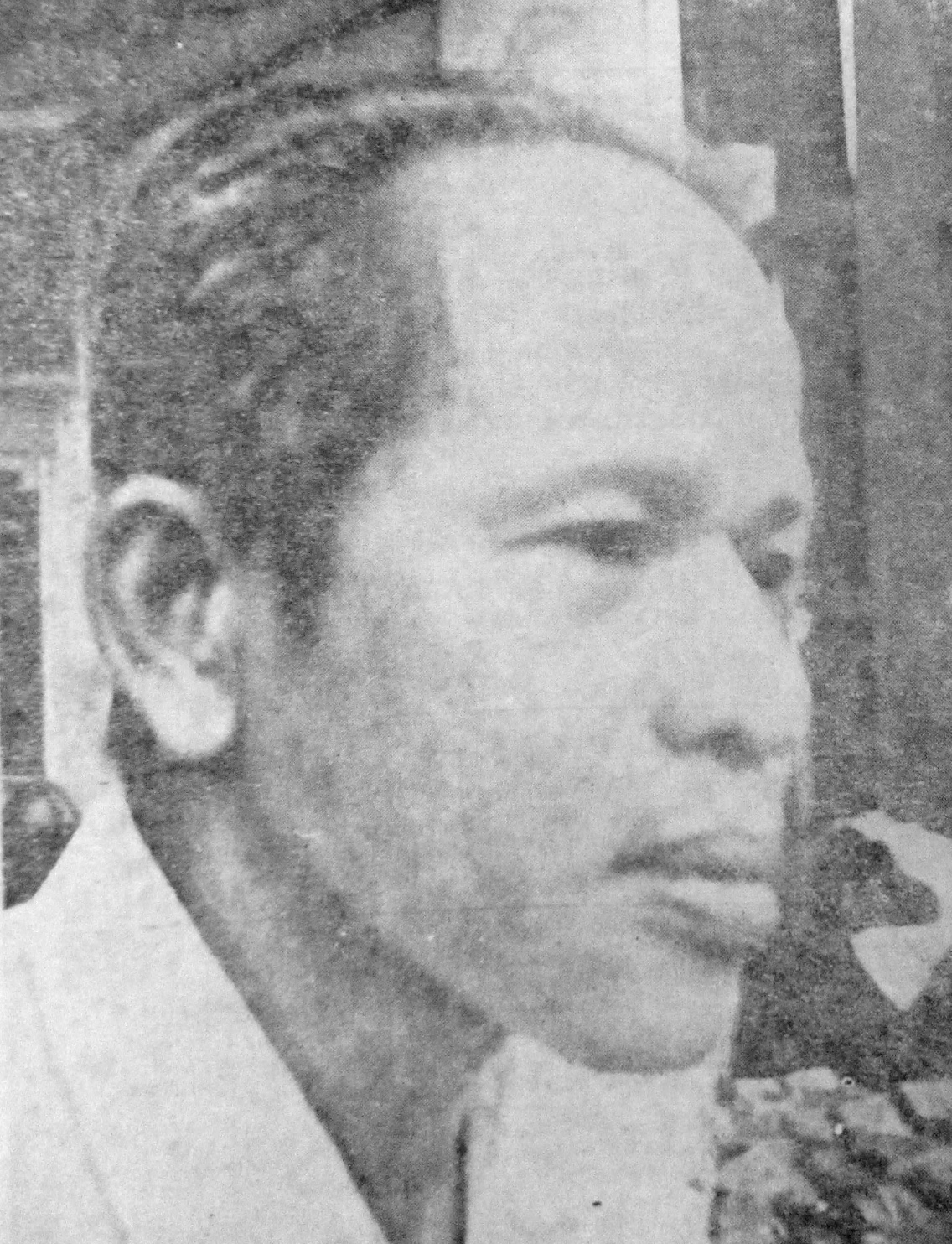
- Born: 6 December 1916; Surabaya, East Java, Dutch East Indies
- Died: 21 April 1969 (aged 52); Jakarta, Indonesia
- Resting place: Karet Bivak Cemetery

Trisno Sumardjo (Enhanced Spelling: Trisno Sumarjo, 6 December 1916 – 21 April 1969) was an Indonesian writer, translator, and painter. Born to a schoolteacher in Surabaya, he took up art and literature in the 1940s while with the Young Artists of Indonesia. After moving to Jakarta in 1950, he edited several publications, translated multiple works by William Shakespeare, and continued to paint. His main source of income was his literary output, which beginning with Katahati dan Perbuatan ('Conscience and Deeds') in 1952 also included several books of prose and poetry. In the late 1960s, he helped establish the Ismail Marzuki Park, which he led until his death.

Sumardjo was generally marginalized within his lifetime by both the literata and painters of Indonesia, with the Dutch scholar of Indonesian literature A. Teeuw writing in 1967 that he had had "no great impact". At the same time, he was recognized by his contemporaries for his devotion to intellectual honesty, cultural plurality, and artistic freedom. Critics have identified an undercurrent of pessimism in his literary works and noted a preference for dark colours in his paintings. Sumardjo's translations of Shakespeare have been praised.

== Biography ==
Trisno Sumardjo was born in Tarik Village, Surabaya, on the eastern coast of Java in the Dutch East Indies (now Indonesia), on 6 December 1916. The son of an elementary school teacher, he had access to Dutch-language schooling. He completed his secondary studies in Yogyakarta, with a focus on literature, in 1937. After graduating, he spent four years as a private teacher. In 1942, he began to work for the railroad.

Sumardjo joined the Young Artists of Indonesia while the group was in Surakarta in 1946, and edited the group's magazine Seniman (lit. 'Artist'). In 1950, he moved to Jakarta, where he became the secretary of the Badan Musyawarah Kebudayaan Nasional ('Congress of National Culture', BMKN). This organization sought to promote contemporary Indonesian literature, including through a monthly magazine titled Indonesia, (Note: The magazine had been inaugurated by Idrus and printed by Balai Pustaka in 1949, but later taken over by the BMKN (Teeuw 1967, p. 116).) which Sumardjo edited. He continued to paint, participating in a joint exhibition with Basuki Resobowo, Oesman Effendi and Zaini in September 1952. However, he sold few works; speaking to the American art historian Claire Holt, he described himself as "painting for a year to live half a month". (Note: Original: "melukis setahun untuk hidup setengah bulan".)

Sumardjo's main source of income was his literary work. He published his first book, Katahati dan Perbuatan ('Conscience and Deeds') in 1952. This book contained five stories, two short plays, and several poems written between 1946 and 1950. This was followed by a stage play in verse titled Tjita Teruna ('Youthful Ideals') in 1953. In 1957, he published the short story collection Rumah Raja ('The Great House'). To obtain inspiration, he travelled abroad on several cultural missions. This included a six-month journey through the United States and Europe in 1952, funded through a Rockefeller Foundation grant, as well as a trip to China in 1957. Describing these trips, he viewed American art as highly derivative of European art, which he considered representative of a "sterile personality", while also rejecting the highly politicized state of Chinese art.

In 1958, Sumardjo was a co-founder of the Foundation for Indonesian Art and Design alongside Effendi and Zaini. By 1967, the foundation had opened its own art museum, which Holt characterized as among the best in Jakarta. He undertook a second trip to the United States in 1961, arriving in April. He crossed the country, with a stop in Hartford, Connecticut, and a week in Albuquerque, New Mexico, before returning to Indonesia via San Francisco. The following year, he published Daun Kering ('Dry Leaves'), a collection of short stories written between 1951 and 1958 that included several anecdotes from his international travels.

Sumardjo was an active translator, with shorter works of fiction from Europe, Africa, Asia, and the United States included in magazines such as Konfrontasi and Sastra. Standalone translations included several works by William Shakespeare, mostly published between 1950 and 1955; his translation of Anthony and Cleopatra was serialized in Indonesia between October 1961 and June 1963 and his translation of King Lear was only published in 1976. He also translated Boris Pasternak's Dr. Zhivago (1957), as well as works by Edgar Allan Poe and Jean de La Fontaine. In his translation, Sumardjo used existing English and Dutch sources. According to his notes in the published editions, Sumardjo translated Shakespeare not from the original, but through Dutch-language translations by Leendert Burgersdijk.

In 1964, Sumardjo was a signatory of the Cultural Manifesto, which challenged the Indonesian government's approach to culture in the Guided Democracy era. Approximately two years later, he published a poetry collection titled Silhuet ('Silhouette', c. 1966). Sumardjo published his final short story collection, Wadjah-Wadjah jang Berubah ('Changing Faces') in 1968. He also helped establish the Ismail Marzuki Park (TIM), a cultural centre in Jakarta, in November of that year, with the backing of Governor Ali Sadikin. He was with the centre until his death, concurrently serving as the chairman of the Jakarta Arts Council. He also remained active with the BMKN.

Already sickly, Sumardjo died on 21 April 1969. Sumardjo's body was lain in repose in the dance hall of TIM. The funeral procession then moved to Karet Bivak Cemetery, where Sumardjo was interred at a ceremony that included a speech by the Indonesian literary critic H.B. Jassin.

== Legacy and analysis ==
=== Literature ===
Considered a member of the Indonesian literary canon's "Generation of '45", Sumardjo had published seven original books, thirteen books in translation, and dozens of essays, poems, and short stories by the time of his death, as well as numerous pieces of arts criticism. According to Nashar, in his lifetime Sumardjo was marginalized by Indonesia's literata and painters; literary critics urged him to focus on painting, while painters described him as a man of letters rather than an artist. The Dutch literary critic A. Teeuw similarly described Sumardjo's works as having "no great impact" in 1967. According to the Indonesian writer Abdul Hadi W.M., within a decade of Sumardjo's death his literary works had been forgotten by most Indonesians. Literary critics, likewise, had not explored his oeuvre.

In a 1950 essay, Sumardjo argued that it was time for pessimism after the optimism promoted by the "hypnosis" of the Indonesian National Revolution. He continued by decrying the tendency to frame the revolution as a political issue handled by oligarchic leaders who made plans they never realized. According to Hadi W.M., such pessimism carried over into Sumardjo's literary works, which questioned whether Indonesia's increasingly decadent society could truly realize its cultural aspirations and seemed to have been "written with a furrowed brow". (Note: Original: "[di]tulis dengan dahi berkerut-kerut".) He cited the short story "Asran" as an exception, one of Sumardjo's few stories with a humouristic tone.

Sumardjo argued that "art is the fruit of honesty". (Note: Original: "seni buah kejujuran") Themes of honesty were found in several of his works, which included stories based on his real life experiences. In the June 1969 edition of magazine Horison, Nashar wrote, "His entire life was only for the arts. ... The truth [he] expressed in the arts was the honest voice of the heart." (Note: Original: "Seluruh hidupnya hanya untuk kesenian. ... Kebenaran yang diungkapkan dalam kesenian adalah kata hati yang jujur.") Teeuw wrote that this emphasis on honesty compelled the artist to follow a lonely path. Taufiq Ismail, also in Horison, similarly described Sumardjo's literary struggles as lonely and bitter, which nonetheless produced works with a unique character.

Reviewing Sumardjo's translations of Shakespeare, Michael Skupin of the Chinese Culture University describes the writer as translating "Shakespeare, not Burgersdijk", producing an "exemplary" works with only minor blemishes. He writes that Sumardjo, as with Shakespeare before him, clearly distinguished between prose and poetry, though the iambic pentameter of the original poetry is not maintained. The language draws freely from Indonesian's diverse roots, including words of Dutch, Arabic, Malay, and Sanskrit etymology. Skupin characterizes the translation as at times matching the tone of the original and at times overly cautious. Several terms are presented without translation, including satyr in Hamlet.

=== Art ===
In his painting, Sumardjo blended naturalism and impressionism. Many of his works were landscapes. He favoured dark colours, creating what Ismail characterized as "hard and bitter" (Note: Original: "keras dan pahit") atmosphere. A reviewer for Tempo magazine wrote that most of his linework seemed tense or even stiff, though some paintings—including a view of the Yangtze River held by Ajip Rosidi—had more natural lines and lighter colours. A solo exhibition dedicated to Sumardjo, consisting of 34 paintings and 32 sketches, was held at TIM in April 1988.

In his criticism, Sumardjo promoted cultural plurality, and urged Indonesians to look at forms from photography and film to ceramics and architecture. Nashar characterized him as a warrior for freedom, opposing prescriptions to embrace realism and quickly angered by efforts to limit artists' freedom of expression. For instance, he wrote that while he did not understand abstract art, he was still able to appreciate the works of A. Sadali.

== Selected publications ==
=== Original works ===
- Katahati dan Perbuatan ('Conscience and Deeds', mixed collection, 1952)
- Tjita Teruna ('Youthful Ideals', stage play, 1953)
- Rumah Raja ('The Great House', short story collection, 1957)
- Daun Kering ('Dry Leaves', short story collection, 1962)
- Silhuet ('Silhouette', poetry collection, c. 1966)
- Wadjah-Wadjah jang Berubah ('Changing Faces', short story collection, 1968)

=== Translations ===
- Hamlet, Pangeran Denmark (from William Shakespeare's Hamlet, 1950)
- Saudagar Venezia (from William Shakespeare's The Merchant of Venice, 1950)
- Manasuka (from William Shakespeare's As You Like It, 1952)
- Prahara (from William Shakespeare's The Tempest, 1952)
- Macbeth (from William Shakespeare's Macbeth, 1952)
- Impian di Tengah Musim (from William Shakespeare's A Midsummer Night's Dream, 1953)
- Romeo dan Julia (from William Shakespeare's Romeo and Juliet, 1955)
- Dongeng Perumpamaan (from Jean de la Fontaine's Fables, 1959)
- Dr. Zhivago (from Boris Pasternak's Dr. Zhivago, 1960)
- Maut dan Misteri (stories from Edgar Allen Poe, 1969)

== Works cited ==
- "Artist from Indonesia". Albuquerque Journal. 10 June 1961. p. 11.
- "Culture Official of Indonesia Visiting City". Hartford Courant. 27 April 1961. p. 27.
- "Expositie 'Berempat'" [Exposition of the 'Berempat']. De Nieuwsgier (in Dutch). Jakarta. 23 September 1952. p. 2.
- Hadi W.M., Abdul (June 1979). "Trisno Sumardjo" (PDF). Horison (in Indonesian). Vol. 14, no. 6. pp. 193–195.
- Holt, Claire (1967). Art in Indonesia: Continuities and Change. Ithaca, New York: Cornell University Press. ISBN 978-0-8014-0188-6.
- Holt, Claire (October 1969). "In Memoriam: Trisno Sumardjo (December 6, 1916 - April 21, 1969)". Indonesia. 8: 213–216. hdl:1813/53471.
- Ismail, Taufiq (June 1969). "Epitaf" [Epitaph] (PDF). Horison (in Indonesian). Vol. 4, no. 6. p. 163.
- Liem, M. (2012). "A Bridge to the Outside World: Literary Translation in Indonesia, 1950–1965". In Lindsay, J.; Liem, M. (eds.). Heirs to World Culture: Being Indonesian 1950–1965. Amsterdam: KITLV Press. pp. 163–190.
- "Mengingat-Ingat Trisno Sumardjo" [Remembering Trisno Sumardjo]. Tempo (in Indonesian). Vol. 18, no. 8. 23 April 1988. p. 45.
- Nashar (June 1969). "In Memoriam: Trisno Sumardjo" (PDF). Horison (in Indonesian). Vol. 4, no. 6. pp. 170–171.
- Siregar, Aminudin T.H. (2022). "Art Photography in Indonesia: J.M. Arastath Ro'is, Trisno Sumardjo, and Zenith Magazine". In Arnold, Brian C. (ed.). A History of Photography in Indonesia: From the Colonial Era to the Digital Age. Amsterdam: Amsterdam University Press. pp. 181–194. doi:10.1017/9789048558025.008. ISBN 978-90-485-5802-5.
- Skupin, Michael (2013). "Shakespeare Comes to Indonesia". Multicultural Shakespeare: Translation, Appropriation and Performance. 10 (25): 99–119. doi:10.2478/mstap-2013-0008. hdl:11089/9471.
- Teeuw, A. (1967). Modern Indonesian literature. Germany: Springer Science+Business Media. doi:10.1007/978-94-015-0768-4. ISBN 978-94-015-0250-4.
