= Claire Holt (art historian) =

American art historian

Claire Holt (August 23, 1901 - May 29, 1970) was a Russian-born American journalist, anthropologist, and art historian specializing in the arts of Indonesia.

Photo of Claire Holt, W. Stutterheim and Walter Spies

== Early life ==
Born to an upper-middle class Jewish family as Claire Bagg in Riga, Russian Empire in 1901, Holt married Bernard Hopfenberg in 1920 and emigrated from the Soviet Union shortly thereafter with her husband. In 1921, they moved to New York City, where she received instruction at the Brooklyn Law School and Columbia University School of Journalism. During this time, she also studied sculpture with Alexander Archipenko at Cooper Union for the Advancement of Science and Art. Her husband died in 1928. From 1928 to 1930 she was employed as a reporter for The New York World, for which she wrote dance reviews under the pen name Claire Holt, which later became her legal name. In 1930, she traveled to Indonesia where she studied and documented Indonesian dance through film and photography with Rolf de Mare, a Swedish dance archivist and art collector. She returned to the US upon the start of World War II and served as a research assistant to anthropologist Margaret Mead at the Museum of Natural History.

== Career ==
Holt joined the staff of Cornell University in 1957 as a research associate. Her most important work of scholarship was Art in Indonesia: Continuities and Change (Ithaca, NY: Cornell University Press, 1967), an interdisciplinary introduction to Hindu and Buddhist monuments of Indonesia and the heritage of Indian influence in the performance arts. In 1965, she helped found the Cornell Modern Indonesia Project with faculty in the Cornell Southeast Asia Program, a compilation of analyses of contemporary Indonesia and translations of documents regarding Indonesia's socio-political evolution in the 20th century made available for scholarship. Her approach to art history incorporated history and politics into the analysis of sculpture, dance, and traditional and modern painting. She was still active in scholarship at the time of her death in 1970.
