= Al-Ahwaz theater (Zanj Rebellion) =

- Part of the Zanj Rebellion
- Map of al-Ahwaz (black) and the surrounding regions (red) during the Zanj Rebellion.
Date	869–881
Location	Al-Ahwaz Province
Result	Abbasid victory

Belligerents
Abbasid Caliphate	Zanj rebels	Saffarid Amirate

Commanders and leaders
Ibrahim ibn Sima †; Mansur ibn Ja'far al-Khayyat †; Asghajun; Abd al-Rahman ibn Muflih; Abu al-Saj; Masrur al-Balkhi; Ahmad ibn Laythawayh; Takin al-Bukhari; Aghartmish	Ali ibn Aban; Al-Khalil ibn Aban; Bahbudh ibn Abd al-Wahhab	Muhammad ibn Ubaydallah al-Kurdi; Hisn ibn al-Anbar

The al-Ahwaz theater was one of two major areas of operations during the Zanj Rebellion, the other being the regions of lower and central Iraq. Beginning in 869, Zanj armies repeatedly entered the province of al-Ahwaz (modern Khuzestan province, Iran) and succeeded in scoring several victories against the defending forces of the Abbasid Caliphate. Over the course of the next decade, the rebels attacked and looted many of the cities in the region, including Suq al-Ahwaz (the provincial capital), 'Askar Mukram and Ramhurmuz. By the height of the rebellion in the mid-870s the Zanj were effectively in control of extensive portions of the province, appointing governors to the districts under their sway and collecting supplies from the local population. During this period, the Zanj in al-Ahwaz were usually commanded by Ali ibn Aban al-Muhallabi, a primary lieutenant of the overall Zanj leader Ali ibn Muhammad.

In an effort to contain the Zanj, the Abbasid government in Samarra dispatched several commanders to the province to fight against the rebels. The caliphal armies were at times able to defeat the Zanj in battle, but they were unsuccessful in dislodging them from the province and frequently suffered severe losses themselves. The Abbasid war effort was further complicated after the Saffarid amir Ya'qub ibn al-Layth arrived in al-Ahwaz in 875 and attempted to assert his own authority over the region, at the expense of both the Zanj and the Abbasids.

The Zanj presence in al-Ahwaz came to a sudden end in 881, when Ali ibn Aban was ordered to abandon the region and return to lower Iraq, where the remaining military events of the rebellion would take place.

== Initial operations ==
The Zanj Rebellion began in early September 869, in the region of southern Iraq. The leader of the revolt was one Ali ibn Muhammad, who had previously led two failed movements against the Abbasid government in 863 and 868. 'Ali was able to quickly gather a major following, especially among the black slaves who had been employed to cultivate the lands in the area of the modern Shatt al-Arab. The rebels soon spread out through the districts around the city of Basra, and began taking control of the villages in the region.

Due to their proximity to Basra, some of the border districts of al-Ahwaz were entered by the Zanj in the initial months of the revolt. The rebels' movements in the province at this stage, however, were restricted to the lands around the southern Dujayl River (the modern Karun). The Zanj secured peace agreements with some of the villages in the area; other settlements, however, resisted the rebels and were attacked as a result.

== First occupation of Suq al-Ahwaz ==
For almost a year following the outbreak of the revolt, the rebels had mostly remained confined to the districts in the vicinity of Basra. In mid-870, however, the Zanj succeeded in overrunning al-Ubulla and receiving the submission of 'Abbadan, and the rebels sought to follow up these victories with further attacks. The Zanj leader 'Ali ibn Muhammad decided to expand to the northeast and make al-Ahwaz the target of his next campaign, and an army was ordered to proceed to the province.

The Zanj troops that set out for al-Ahwaz were enthusiastic about their mission, and they were reinforced with slaves and weapons that had been confiscated from 'Abbadan. Their first target was Jubba, to the east of the Dujayl. The residents of the town offered no resistance and fled, allowing the Zanj to enter Jubba and pillage it. From there, they spread through the environs of Jubba, which were laid waste. The rebels then continued marching north, and at last arrived before the city of al-Ahwaz, otherwise known as Suq al-Ahwaz.

News of the Zanj approach was met with great trepidation in the city. The military governor of al-Ahwaz at the time was Sa'id ibn Yaksin, who had a contingent of troops at his disposal. Sa'id, however, decided to withdraw from the city, taking his soldiers with him, and the residents of al-Ahwaz also fled. Consequently, when the Zanj army reached Suq al-Ahwaz they were able to enter and occupy the city, with almost no one offering resistance. The fiscal governor Ibrahim ibn Muhammad ibn al-Mudabbir, who had remained in Suq al-Ahwaz with his pages and servants, was captured by the rebels, and his money, furnishings and slaves were seized.

The Zanj occupation of Suq al-Ahwaz lasted only temporarily, and by the following year the Abbasids reestablished their military presence in the region. The occupation, however, succeeded in opening a new front in the war against the government. The Zanj would occupy Suq al-Ahwaz twice more, in 873 and again in 875, and after the latter occasion they would retain a hold over the city for several years. The capture of al-Ahwaz, together with that of al-Ubulla less than two months prior, also helped spread to fear among the residents of the surrounding regions; many people of Basra, for example, fled their city for safer areas after learning of the Zanj's victory.

== Arrival of Ibrahim ibn Sima ==
In 871, the Zanj leader sent Ali ibn Aban to al-Ahwaz, ordering him to occupy the province and destroy a bridge spanning the Dujayl. Upon reaching the bridge, however, his troops were met by Ibrahim ibn Sima al-Turki, a government commander who had been returning to Iraq from Fars. Ibrahim attacked the rebels from several sides, killing a large number of them and forcing 'Ali to flee. Pursued by Ibrahim's cavalry, 'Ali attempted to reach Suq al-Ahwaz, but a foot wound hindered his movements and he eventually decided to retreat back to Jubba instead.

As a result of his victory, Ibrahim was appointed to conduct the war against the Zanj in al-Ahwaz, and Sa'id ibn Yaksin was dismissed from his post. Ibrahim decided to pursue 'Ali and divided his forces into two, sending one contingent under his secretary Shahin and retaining the other for himself. Informed of their movements, 'Ali met Shahin's force and defeated it, killing Shahin and a large number of his men. He then immediately advanced against Ibrahim, reaching the latter's camp that same evening before the news of Shahin's defeat had reached him. Despite having far fewer troops, 'Ali fell upon Ibrahim's men and successfully routed them, forcing Ibrahim to withdraw in turn.

After the battles against Shahin and Ibrahim, 'Ali remained encamped in Jubba until he was recalled by the Zanj leader in order to take part in the Zanj attack on Basra.

== Killing of Mansur ibn Ja'far ==
After the successful capture of Basra in September 871, Ali ibn Aban was again dispatched to Jubba to fight against Mansur ibn Ja'far al-Khayyat, the military administrator of Basra and the Tigris districts. To reinforce 'Ali, the Zanj leader sent twelve barges laden with troops under the command of Abu al-Layth al-Isbahani, with orders to follow 'Ali's commands. Abu al-Layth, however, decided to attack Mansur on his own and went out to meet him without consulting 'Ali. In the resulting battle, Mansur defeated Abu al-Layth, killing many of his men and capturing his barges.

After learning of Abu al-Layth's defeat, 'Ali also withdrew back to his camp, where he remained for about a month. He then set out to fight Mansur again, and sent scouts to gather information about him. Upon learning of a contingent led by one of Mansur's officers, 'Ali launched a night attack against it, killing the commander and most of his men and looting their camp. News of this raid reached Mansur, who decided to set forth himself, and 'Ali came out to meet him as well. The resulting battle ended in complete victory for 'Ali; Mansur's troops suffered significant casualties and eventually fled, abandoning him on the battlefield. Mansur himself attempted to flee, but was pursued by a Zanj soldier and killed while attempting to cross a canal.

Following Mansur's death, Asghajun was appointed by the government to replace him. 'Ali remained in Jubba for a time, until a dispatch from the Zanj leader reached him to hasten back to Iraq, where Abu Ahmad ibn al-Mutawakkil (the future caliphal regent al-Muwaffaq) had arrived with a large army to attack the chief Zanj "city" of al-Mukhtarah.

== Second occupation of Suq al-Ahwaz, Ibn Muflih ==
In 873, following the withdrawal of Abu Ahmad from southern Iraq, the Zanj leader ordered Ali ibn Aban to return to al-Ahwaz with most of his troops. Upon learning of the rebels' advance, Asghajun advanced from Suq al-Ahwaz against 'Ali with his own forces, and the two sides met in a desert. The battle went badly for the government army; Asghajun and many of his men were killed and others were taken prisoner. The Zanj then made their way to Suq al-Ahwaz and entered it on May 8, upon which they began pillaging and killed a number of its inhabitants.

News of the fate of Suq al-Ahwaz reached the central government in Samarra, which responded by placing the general Musa ibn Bugha al-Kabir in charge of war against the Zanj. Musa sent 'Abd al-Rahman ibn Muflih to al-Ahwaz to engage 'Ali. In his first encounter against the rebels, Ibn Muflih was defeated, but after regrouping his forces, he launched a second attack and inflicted a severe defeat upon the Zanj. Many of 'Ali's men were killed or captured, while 'Ali himself escaped with a few of his followers and fled to southern Iraq.

After spending some time recovering in al-Mukhtarah, 'Ali was again sent out against Ibn Muflih, who had made camp at Hisn al-Mahdi on the Dujayl. He was engaged, however, by Ibrahim ibn Sima, who was then encamped at al-Badhaward, and was defeated twice by him. For his part, Ibn Muflih received word of 'Ali's movements and dispatched his lieutenant Tashtimur against him. Tashimur found that 'Ali had retreated into an area of dense thickets and reeds, so to force him out he ordered his troops to set fire to the vegetation. 'Ali was able to escape, but several of his men were captured by Tashtimur, who sent word of his victory to Ibn Muflih.

Following his defeat, 'Ali made his way to the Nahr al-Sidrah, in the area of the Dujayl south of Suq al-Ahwaz, where he wrote to the Zanj leader asking for reinforcements. Thirteen barges with several contingents of Zanj soldiers were sent to him, upon which 'Ali decided to advance again against Ibn Muflih. The two armies met, but refrained from fighting for a day. That night, 'Ali took several of his most trusted troops and made his way to the rear of Ibn Muflih's camp, where he launched a surprise attack. The government army was defeated and Ibn Muflih retreated, abandoning four of his barges in the process.

Ibn Muflih proceeded to al-Dawlab near Suq al-Ahwaz, where he reestablished his camp. Once he had recovered from his defeat, he sent Tashtimur to engage 'Ali, who was defeated and forced to retreat to the Nahr al-Sidrah. Ibn Muflih then set out with the rest of his forces, and succeeded in inflicting a major defeat on 'Ali, who lost ten of his barges during the battle. 'Ali was forced to retreat back to Iraq, and Ibn Muflih himself proceeded to Bayan.

== Abu al-Saj and the third occupation of Suq al-Ahwaz ==
Ibn Muflih and Tashtimur were both killed in early 875 by Muhammad ibn Wasil, the rebel governor of Fars; at the same time, Musa ibn Bugha decided to resign his command of the operations against the Zanj and returned to Samarra. In response, the central government appointed Abu al-Saj as military governor of al-Ahwaz and tasked him with defeating the rebels there.

Shortly after Abu al-Saj's arrival, Ali ibn Aban advanced into al-Ahwaz and proceeded to the Nahr al-Sidrah. There he fought against a government army and defeated it, killing its commander, a relative of Abu al-Saj's. The latter decided to withdraw to 'Askar Mukram, allowing the Zanj to advance to Suq al-Ahwaz. Upon entering the city, they proceeded to begin killing and capturing its residents, and pillaged and burned their homes.

Following the sack of Suq al-Ahwaz, Abu al-Saj was dismissed from his post and was temporarily replaced with Ibrahim ibn Sima. Later that year, Masrur al-Balkhi was given overall command of the war against the rebels.

== Ya'qub ibn al-Layth, Muhammad ibn 'Ubaydallah and Ahmad ibn Laythawayh ==
A new development in the war emerged in late 875 when the Saffarid amir Ya'qub ibn al-Layth arrived in Ramhurmuz. Ya'qub had spent the last several years becoming one of the most powerful rulers in the Islamic east, having conquered the provinces of Sijistan, Kirman, Khurasan and Fars. He furthermore sought to expand into the core regions of the Abbasid Caliphate, a policy that would culminate in early 876 with the Battle of Dayr al-Aqul in central Iraq. Although the battle ended in defeat for Ya'qub and forced him out of Iraq, he still sought to maintain his authority in al-Ahwaz, at the expense of both the Abbasid government and the Zanj.

Ya'qub appointed Muhammad ibn Ubaydallah al-Kurdi as governor of the districts of al-Ahwaz. Muhammad, however, soon entered into correspondence with the Zanj leader and offered to defect to the rebels' side. The Zanj leader agreed to the offer, on the condition that Muhammad submit to Ali ibn Aban as the latter's deputy.

The approximate movements of Ahmad ibn Laythawayh against Ali ibn Aban and Muhammad ibn 'Ubaydallah.

With Muhammad now on his side, 'Ali decided to send an expedition under his brother al-Khalil to al-Sus, where Ahmad ibn Laythawayh, who had been appointed by Masrur al-Balkhi as the military governor of al-Ahwaz, was staying. Al-Khalil and Muhammad joined forces and headed toward the city, but Ibn Laythawayh intercepted them before they arrived and launched an attack. Many of the rebels were killed or captured, and the rest soon withdrew. Ibn Laythawayh then proceeded to Junday Sabur and established himself there.

Upon learning of the defeat, Ali ibn Aban decided to assist Muhammad and departed from Suq al-Ahwaz with his troops. 'Ali and Muhammad's forces separately traveled along the Nahr Masruqan and eventually met up at 'Askar Mukram, where 'Ali and Muhammad discussed their plans. The two armies then split up again, with Muhammad heading toward Tustar to establish himself in that city, while 'Ali proceeded to a bridge on the road to Fars.

While Ali was stationed at the bridge, he received word that, although Muhammad had entered Tustar, he was making the prayers there on behalf of the caliph and Ya'qub ibn al-Layth, instead of the Zanj leader. Considering this to be evidence of Muhammad's betrayal, Ali ordered his forces to return immediately to Suq al-Ahwaz and destroyed the bridge to prevent anyone from following him. After a night's march, the rebels entered 'Askar Mukram, which they attacked and plundered despite a prior agreement with the city. Ali arrived after his troops and found what they had done, but was too late to stop them, and ordered them to continue back to Suq al-Ahwaz.

News of Ali's retreat reached Ahmad ibn Laythawayh, who had in the meantime returned to al-Sus. He decided to advance on Tustar and engaged Muhammad in combat. Muhammad was defeated and forced to escape, and Ibn Laythawayh established himself in Tustar.

Ali now set out for Tustar with the intention of fighting Ibn Laythawayh. Along the way, he learned that Ibn Laythawayh was also heading in his direction, and the two armies met near the Nahr Masruqan. Ibn Laythawayh's cavalry gave him a massive advantage, and the battle turned into a complete rout, with only a few of the Zanj infantry standing firm. Ali, who had been wounded in the leg by an arrow, barely managed to escape by jumping into the Nahr Masruqan. He managed to reach Suq al-Ahwaz, but he decided not to remain there and instead returned to al-Mukhtarah to treat his wounds.

After fully recovering from his injuries, Ali set out to return to al-Ahwaz. Having learned that Ibn Laythawayh was at 'Askar Mukram, he sent a large army under the command of al-Khalil and his nephew Abu Sahl Muhammad ibn Salih against him. The two leaders met Ibn Laythawayh's forces a farsakh outside the city and engaged him in battle. Ibn Laythawayh, however, executed a feigned retreat, and when the Zanj pursued him they were ambushed by a second regiment. With the rebels being routed, Ibn Laythawayh rejoined the battle, and the Zanj were compelled to make a full retreat. Once the battle was over, Ibn Laythawayh collected the heads of the slain rebels and headed for Tustar.

== Zanj-Saffarid conflict ==
Shortly after the battle at 'Askar Mukram, Ibn Laythawayh learned that Ya'qub ibn al-Layth was advancing toward al-Ahwaz; feeling that his position was now untenable, he decided to quit the region and fled from Tustar. Ya'qub proceeded to Junday Sabur, forcing the agents of the central government to evacuate the district. After establishing himself in the city, he sent al-Hisn ibn al-'Anbar to Suq al-Ahwaz to serve as his governor there. Upon learning of al-Hisn's advance, Ali ibn Aban decided to abandon the city and set up camp along the Nahr al-Sidrah, allowing al-Hisn to occupy Suq al-Ahwaz without incident.

'Ali and al-Hisn began to launch raids against each other, inflicting casualties on both sides. This continued until 'Ali decided to attack al-Hisn at Suq al-Ahwaz. In a fierce battle, the rebels inflicted a serious defeat on al-Hisn; many of the Saffarid troops were killed and the mounts of the cavalry were captured. Al-Hisn fled to 'Askar Mukram, while the victorious Zanj set about plundering Suq al-Ahwaz. 'Ali then returned to the Nahr al-Sidrah, where he dispatched an expedition against a Kurdish leader loyal to Ya'qub who was stationed at Dawraq. This engagement also went well for the Zanj, who captured the Kurd and killed a number of his men.

Following the defeats at the hands of the Zanj, Ya'qub ordered al-Hisn to refrain from engaging them in further combat and to restrict himself to Suq al-Ahwaz. He also wrote to 'Ali and sought a truce, on the condition that he be allowed to keep troops in the city. 'Ali responded by rejecting his proposal, unless he would be allowed to transfer food supplies from the city first. Ya'qub agreed to this and allowed 'Ali to remove his supplies, and the two sides ended hostilities with each other.

== Takin al-Bukhari ==
Ya'qub died in Junday Sabur in 879, and in that same year Masrur al-Balkhi appointed Takin al-Bukhari as military governor of al-Ahwaz. Upon arriving in the province, Takin learned that Ali ibn Aban was proceeding toward Tustar with a large army, so he set off for that city as well. When he reached Tustar, he found that 'Ali had surrounded the city and that it was on the verge of surrender. Without spending any time to prepare, Takin ordered an attack and successfully routed the Zanj, forcing them to withdraw from Tustar.

Shortly after the battle, Takin was informed that 'Ali had sent a contingent to the Fars bridge, and that it was in a poor state of discipline. He therefore advanced against their position and staged a night assault, which killed several rebel commanders and forced the rest to flee. Takin then continued along the Nahr Masruqan and eventually reached 'Ali's camp, but the latter decided not to fight and withdrew instead.

At this point, Ali and Takin began corresponding with each other, and messages and courtesies were sent between the two. News of this reached Masrur al-Balkhi, which caused him to suspect Takin's loyalty. He therefore departed for al-Ahwaz and wrote to Takin, expressing approval of his conduct. Unsuspectingly, Takin agreed to meet with Masrur, but when he arrived at his camp he was disarmed and imprisoned. Upon learning that Takin was in custody, his troops began to disperse; several of them entered into the service of Ali ibn Aban, while others joined Muhammad ibn 'Ubaydallah. In order to prevent further defections, Masrur issued a guarantee of safe conduct for the troops that remained, whereupon they agreed to join his forces.

== Aghartmish ==
With Takin now imprisoned, Aghartmish was appointed as military governor of al-Ahwaz in his place. With orders to fight against Ali ibn Aban, Aghartmish and other commanders marched until they reached Tustar, where they killed a number of Zanj prisoners that Takin had taken captive. They then continued south and eventually reached Askar Mukram.

Ali, meanwhile, decided to set out against Aghartmish and marched north, with his brother al-Khalil commanding his vanguard. Due to the rebels' superior numbers, however, the government army refrained from fighting and cut a bridge to hinder Ali's advance. Ali then returned to Suq al-Ahwaz, leaving al-Khalil at Masruqan. At Suq al-Ahwaz, he received a message from al-Khalil that Aghartmish was again advancing toward him, so he departed to meet the government forces and ordered al-Khalil to join him. A battle took place between the two sides and ended with Aghartmish the victor. Ali withdrew to Suq al-Ahwaz, but he found that his reserve forces there had fled to the Nahr al-Sidrah, so he followed them and joined up with them there.

Ali regrouped his troops and prepared to stage another attack against Aghartmish. The latter responded by drawing up his own forces and marched against the Zanj. 'Ali again put al-Khalil in his vanguard and instructed another commander, Bahbudh ibn Abd al-Wahhab, to position himself in ambush. Al-Khalil then marched against Aghartmish and began an engagement with him. The government army gained an initial advantage during the battle, but when they were attacked by the ambushers and suffered defeat. One of the government commanders was taken prisoner, and Ali ordered him to be decapitated in retaliation for the deaths of the prisoners at Tustar. 'Ali then proceeded to Suq al-Ahwaz and sent the heads of the slain to al-Mukhtarah, where they were put on display, while Aghartmish and the remnants of his forces retreated back to Tustar.

Fighting continued for a time between 'Ali and Aghartmish, with neither side clearly gaining the upper hand. When reinforcements arrived from al-Mukhtarah to bolster 'Ali's position, however, Aghartmish decided to seek a truce with 'Ali, which the latter accepted. 'Ali then proceeded to raid the nearby districts, and eventually arrived at Bayrudh, which he subdued and plundered. He sent the spoils to al-Mukhtarah and established himself in the village.

== Conflict between Ali ibn Aban and Muhammad ibn Ubaydallah ==
Relations between 'Ali and Muhammad ibn 'Ubaydallah, the former governor for Ya'qub ibn al-Layth, had remained poor since the incident at Tustar. In an attempt to free himself from 'Ali, Muhammad wrote to Ankalay, the son of the Zanj leader, and asked that the district under his control be removed from 'Ali's jurisdiction and assigned directly to him. This deal angered 'Ali, and in retaliation he requested that Muhammad's tax revenues be transferred to him. When he received the Zanj leader's approval, he demanded the money from Muhammad, but the latter delayed payment. 'Ali used the delay as a pretext to attack Muhammad, and set out for Ramhurmuz where he way staying. Lacking the means to face 'Ali, Muhammad decided to flee, and Ramhurmuz was ransacked by 'Ali's troops. A panicked Muhammad decided to request a reconciliation with 'Ali, which the Zanj leader assented to. Muhammad then turned over his tax revenues to 'Ali, who in turn forwarded the money to al-Mukhtarah and agreed to keep his distance from the areas under Muhammad's control.

Some time after this, Muhammad wrote to 'Ali, asking that he assist him in attacking a group of Kurds and offering that any loot received would go to the Zanj troops. 'Ali agreed and sent al-Khalil and Bahbudh to participate in the raid. The battle initially proceeded in favor of the Zanj, but when the Kurds counterattacked Muhammad's men suddenly deserted the field, forcing the Zanj to retreat. While they were in flight, they were attacked by another contingent of Muhammad's men, and lost many of their mounts and spoils in the fighting. When the surviving Zanj returned to 'Ali and reported what had happened, he immediately wrote to the Zanj leader about the incident. Terse negotiations then ensued between al-Mukhtarah, 'Ali and Muhammad, which ended with Muhammad agreeing to return the stolen mounts and send additional compensation.

Once the situation with Muhammad had been resolved, 'Ali took no action for a while. Eventually he decided to attack the stronghold of Mattuth and marched against it. When he arrived, however, he saw that it had strong fortifications and numerous defenders, so he decided to make further preparations before assaulting it. He withdrew and began assembling ladders and tools for scaling walls; once this was completed, he ordered his army to again approach the city. As he drew near Mattuth this time, however, he was suddenly attacked by Masrur al-Balkhi, who had learned of 'Ali's plans. The sight of Masrur's cavalry caused Ali's men to abandon their equipment and flee, and 'Ali was forced to retreat.

== Zanj abandonment of al-Ahwaz ==
The Abbasid government had launched a major offensive in late 879 against the Zanj in central Iraq; led by the prince Abu al-'Abbas (the future caliph al-Mu'tadid [r. 892–902]), the government army had succeeded in inflicting several major defeats against the Zanj in the regions of Wasit and the Batihah. In September 880 another army commanded by Abu al-'Abbas' father, the caliphal regent al-Muwaffaq, joined the fighting. The Zanj presence in central Iraq was soon all but eliminated; several towns were recovered by the government and the two rebel strongholds of al-Mani'ah and al-Mansurah were captured. The rebel forces in the region were gradually forced to withdraw and retreat closer to their capital of al-Mukhtarah.

The approximate movements of al-Muwaffaq during his advance through al-Ahwaz.

On January 7, 881, al-Muwaffaq set out from Wasit and advanced upon al-Ahwaz, taking the road to al-Sus. With the rebels' position in Iraq becoming increasingly precarious, and with al-Muwaffaq bearing down on Ali ibn Aban's position, the Zanj leader decided to recall 'Ali and have him return to al-Mukhtarah. He therefore wrote to Ali, ordering him to abandon his provisions and equipment and return to Iraq.

Ali, meanwhile, had already learned of al-Muwaffaq's advance; upon receiving the Zanj leader's letter, he appointed a lieutenant in his place and departed from Suq al-Ahwaz. A similar order reached Bahbudh, who governed the villages between al-Ahwaz and Fars; he promptly withdrew and abandoned his supplies as well. The rebels made the journey back to al-Mukhtarah, plundering the villages they encountered along the way despite the fact that they had made peace with the Zanj. Many of 'Ali's men failed to join him and deserted, deciding to remain in the province while 'Ali returned to al-Mukhtarah.

Al-Muwaffaq soon arrived at al-Sus, where he was soon joined by Masrur al-Balkhi, his governor of the province. While at al-Sus, he ordered that the supplies left behind by the Zanj be seized, and set about opening dams that the rebels had put up on the rivers and repairing the local roads. After three days he left al-Sus for Junday Sabur, where he ordered his men to search for fodder. After another three days he continued on to Tustar, and upon arriving there he sent officers throughout the district of al-Ahwaz to collect taxes, and arranged for the payment of Masrur's troops. He also sent a representative to Muhammad ibn 'Ubaydallah, who was still in the province, to negotiate a settlement with him.

Al-Muwaffaq eventually departed from Tustar and proceeded to 'Askar Mukram, and from there he made his way to Suq al-Ahwaz. While there, he discovered that the Zanj had mined a nearby bridge which prevented supplies from reaching the city, so he ordered his men to restore the crossing. Once that was done, he remained in the city for several days in order to strengthen his forces. During this time, the Zanj who had deserted 'Ali wrote to him requesting a pardon; al-Muwaffaq granted this, and about one thousand of 'Ali's men were integrated into his army.

Having reestablished the Abbasid government's authority in al-Ahwaz, al-Muwaffaq departed from Suq al-Ahwaz and made his way south. He and Abu al-'Abbas soon reached al-Mukhtarah in mid-February 881 and began besieging it, thereby initiating the final phase of the rebellion.

== Aftermath ==
During the siege of al-Mukhtarah, which lasted from 881 to 883, no fighting appears to have taken place in al-Ahwaz; the province, however, did contribute to the Abbasid war effort, sending both supplies and volunteers to al-Muwaffaq. When al-Mukhtarah was finally captured in 883, some surviving rebels attempted to flee to al-Ahwaz; one fugitive who had wounded al-Muwaffaq during the siege, for example, was apprehended by the authorities in Ramhurmuz and sent to Abu al-'Abbas, who had him put to death.

After the final defeat of the Zanj, al-Muwaffaq ordered that letters be sent out to the centers of the Muslim world announcing to the people of the districts of Basra, al-Ubulla, al-Ahwaz and Wasit that the rebellion was over and that it was now safe for them to return to their homes.
