= Iraq theater (Zanj Rebellion) =

- Part of the Zanj Rebellion
- Map of lower and central Iraq (black) and the surrounding regions (red) during the Zanj Rebellion.
| Date | 869–883 |
| Location | Iraq |
| Result | Abbasid victory |

Belligerents
| Abbasid Caliphate | Zanj rebels |

Commanders and leaders
| Ju'lan al-Turki; Sa'id ibn Salih al-Hajib; Mansur ibn Ja'far al-Khayyat; Abu Ahmad al-Muwaffaq; Musa ibn Bugha; Ahmad ibn Laythawayh; Abu al-'Abbas ibn al-Muwaffaq | Ali ibn Muhammad †; Al Bahrani (POW); Ibm Jami' (POW); Al Jubba'i †; Al Sha'rani (POW) |

The Iraq theater was one of two major areas of operations during the Zanj Rebellion, the other being the neighboring province of al-Ahwaz.

The revolt, which began in September 869 in southern Iraq, was initially limited to the region around the port city of Basra, as well as the southern districts of al-Ahwaz to the east. Efforts by the Abbasid caliphs in Samarra to crush the rebellion proved ineffectual, and several towns and villages were occupied or sacked. Basra itself fell in September 871 following an extended blockade, after which the city was burned and its inhabitants massacred. A retaliatory campaign undertaken by the caliphal regent Abu Ahmad ibn al-Mutawakkil (known by his honorific of al-Muwaffaq) against the rebels in 872 ended in failure, and the Zanj remained on the offensive over the next several years.

The continuing inability of the Abbasid central government to suppress the revolt, caused in part by its preoccupation with fighting against the Saffarid Ya'qub ibn al-Layth's advance into Iraq, eventually encouraged the Zanj to expand their activities to the north. A campaign by the rebels to occupy the marshlands between Basra and Wasit in 876 proved successful, and soon they made their way into the district of Kaskar. By 879, the rebellion reached its furthest extent; Wasit was sacked and the rebels advanced northwest along the Tigris, coming to within fifty miles of Baghdad.

The Abbasid government finally regained the initiative in the war in late 879, when al-Muwaffaq sent his son Abu al-'Abbas (the future caliph al-Mu'tadid) with a major force against the rebels. Al-Muwaffaq himself joined the offensive in the following year, and over the next several months the government forces succeeded in driving the rebels back toward their "capital" of al-Mukhtarah, to the south of Basra. Al-Mukhtarah itself was put under siege in February 881, and its fall in August 883, combined with the death or capture of most of the rebel commanders, brought the revolt to an end.

In the opening stages of the war, the Zanj were personally led by the revolt's leader 'Ali ibn Muhammad. Following the construction of al-Mukhtarah, however, 'Ali seldom went into the field himself, and the rebels armies in Iraq came to be led by several of his deputies, such as Yahya ibn Muhammad al-Bahrani and then, after the latter's capture and execution in 872, Sulayman ibn Jami', Ahmad ibn Mahdi al-Jubba'i, and Sulayman ibn Musa al-Sha'rani. The Abbasid government, for its part, rotated a number of officers to prosecute the war against the Zanj, but few of these made significant progress in quelling the rebellion prior to 879.

The Zanj armies, bolstered by allied Arab tribesmen, included a mix of both infantry and cavalry troops, and were able to repeatedly score victories against the government forces in both pitched battles and ambushes. Both sides were also heavily reliant on watercraft to navigate the extensive canal system of lower Iraq and the waterways of the marshlands, and barges were frequently used to transport both men and supplies. The rebels also undertook other activities in the districts under their control, such as constructing fortresses, securing agreements with neighboring villages, collecting taxes and supplies, digging canals, and minting their own coins.

== Background ==
The leader of the rebellion was one 'Ali ibn Muhammad, a man of obscure background. Prior to the outbreak of the revolt, 'Ali had traveled to the province of al-Bahrayn in eastern Arabia 863, where he gained a number of followers, including Yahya ibn Muhammad al-Bahrani and Sulayman ibn Jami', and attempted to form an imamate in opposition to the Abbasids. This scheme, however, floundered due to opposition from the local inhabitants, and in 868 he decided to depart for the port city of Basra in southern Iraq.

At Basra 'Ali again proclaimed a new revolt, but this also failed when the populace refused to support him. He was forced to flee Basra for the nearby marshlands, where he was arrested and transported to the city of Wasit. After a short time, however, 'Ali was able to convince the local governor to release him and his companions, and he afterwards made his way to Baghdad. There he remained for the next year, during which time he gained additional followers for his cause.

In 869 'Ali learned that his family, who had previously been incarcerated in Basra, had been released. He therefore decided to return to the Basra region, arriving there with his followers in August/September of that year. Upon his arrival he began to induce the local slave laborers, including Zanj slaves trafficked from eastern Africa to slavery in the Abbasid Caliphate, to join him, and adopted a heterodox slogan to give religious justification for a revolt.

== 869 ==
=== Initial operations ===
Map of the Basra region (red), the initial area affected by the Zanj Rebellion in Iraq.

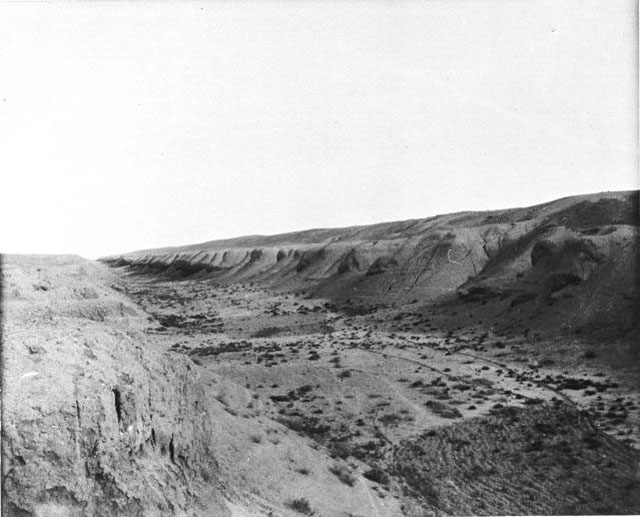
The dry bed of the Nahrawan Canal in central Iraq. The canals of the Basra region were the scene of many battles during the rebellion, and were used by both the Abbasid government and the rebels to transport men and supplies.

Map of the canals (nahrs) of the Basra region: 1. Abu al-Asad; 2. al-Marah; 3. al-Dayr; 4. Bithq Shirin; 5. Ma'qil; 6. al-Ubulla; 7. Abu al-Khasib; 8. al-Amir; 9. al-Qandil.

In early September 869, 'Ali and his followers began seizing slaves in the Basra region and encouraged them with promises of plunder if they sided with his rebellion. After several hundred slaves joined him in this manner, he crossed the Dujayl and set up a camp, where he continued to recruit more followers. A few days later, the rebels defeated a detachment just after Eid al-Fitr, thus winning their first victory.

The local authorities and magnates quickly scrambled to suppress the revolt, and a force of four thousand men was sent to attack the Zanj. Despite being poorly equipped for combat, the rebels defeated this army and took a number of prisoners, who 'Ali ordered to be beheaded. 'Ali then made his way to several villages in the region, where the inhabitants either submitted to him or fled, and at the same time gained his first booty. Following several further defeats in battle, the locals attempted to buy 'Ali off if he agreed to return the slaves to their owners, but this was indignantly rejected by the rebel leader and fighting between the two sides went on.

Over the course of the next several weeks, the rebels continued to grow in strength. The efforts of the Basran authorities and landowners to put down the revolt proved ineffective, and several detachments sent against the rebels were defeated. With no force capable of stopping them, the Zanj continued to pillage their way through the region, and a number of villages either voluntarily submitted or were sacked.

=== Battle of the Barges ===
By mid-October the Zanj had grown strong enough to attempt an advance on Basra. As the rebels approached the city, however, they were met by a large group of Basrans and suffered a serious defeat. Encouraged by their success, the Basrans organized a fresh expedition to fight the rebels, who had retreated to a camp on the Nahr Shaytan. The force consisted of a number of barges and galleys, and was escorted on land by a large crowd, which included a number of unarmed civilians.

Upon learning of the Basran advance, 'Ali ibn Muhammad set up an ambush, placing detachments on both banks of the canals. When the Basran force arrived they were suddenly attacked by the Zanj on all sides and were soon overwhelmed. The battle continued until almost the entire Basran force was annihilated; only a few managed to escape the rout.

The Zanj victory on the Nahr Shaytan, known as the Day of the Barges, was a watershed moment in the war, and transformed what had previously been a largely local affair into one requiring the intervention of the central government. In the aftermath of the battle, the residents of Basra became convinced that the rebels had become too strong to be defeated by local forces and abstained from engaging in further fighting. At the same time, the Abbasid government in Samarra realized that it would have to become more involved in suppressing the revolt, and decided to dispatch additional government troops to the region.

== 869-870 ==
=== Arrival of Ju'lan al-Turki, construction of al-Mukhtarah ===
Following the Zanj victory over the Basrans, the Abbasid government sent a force under the command of Ju'lan al-Turki to southern Iraq to fight against 'Ali ibn Muhammad. Ju'lan spent the next six months in the field, but he soon found that his mounted troops could not easily move through the dense landscape, and he was unable to make any headway against the Zanj. After the rebels undertook a devastating night-time raid against his camp, he decided to abandon the campaign and return to Basra. Ju'lan's withdrawal convinced the government that he was unsuitable for the task of defeating the rebels; he was therefore dismissed and his command was given to Sa'id ibn Salih al-Hajib instead.

Around the same time, 'Ali ibn Muhammad made his way to the western side of the Nahr Abi al-Khasib and began construction on a settlement there. Known as al-Mukhtarah, it became the "headquarters" of the Zanj for the duration of the revolt, serving as the primary residence of the Zanj leader and as a place of refuge for the rebels. From this point forward, 'Ali ibn Muhammad largely refrained from personally leading the Zanj into battle, and instead remained in al-Mukhtarah and delegated the command of his forces to his lieutenants.

=== Occupation of al-Ubulla ===
Julan's withdrawal to Basra and the weakness of the government forces allowed the Zanj to continue their raiding activities in lower Iraq unimpeded. Soon after Ju'lan left the field, 'Ali ibn Muhammad decided to undertake an expedition against one of the cities of the region. He initially intended to send his troops against 'Abbadan; after his army began their march, however, he was advised that al-Ubulla would be a better target. As a result, he recalled his men and ordered them to head toward that city instead.

Upon arriving at al-Ubulla, the Zanj found the city to be defended by Abu al-Ahwas al-Bahili, whom Ju'lan had appointed as its governor. Nevertheless, the rebels initiated their assault, attacking the city both on land and from commandeered boats. Fighting between the Zanj and defenders continued until the evening of June 28, 870, at which point the Zanj stormed the city from the direction of the Tigris and the Nahr al-Ubulla. The defenders were soon overwhelmed, and both the governor and his son were killed during the fighting.

As the Zanj spread throughout the city, they put it to the torch. Many buildings in al-Ubulla were made of teakwood and were constructed close together; as a result, the fire soon spread throughout the city, destroying much of it. Many residents were killed; others attempted to flee into the waterways and drowned. The Zanj then began to plunder al-Ubulla and collected large number of spoils, but by that point most of the city's goods had been destroyed by the flames.

News of the sack of al-Ubulla spread terror throughout the region. The residents of 'Abbadan, fearing that they would suffer a similar fate, decided to surrender to the Zanj. 'Ali ibn Muhammad sent troops to the city, where they were allowed to seize any weapons and slaves that they could find. The people of Basra were also panicked by the news; the fall of al-Ubulla, together with that of al-Ahwaz later that year, caused many to flee the city, moving to safer areas not subject to Zanj attack.

== 870-871 ==
=== Campaign of Sa'id ibn Salih ===
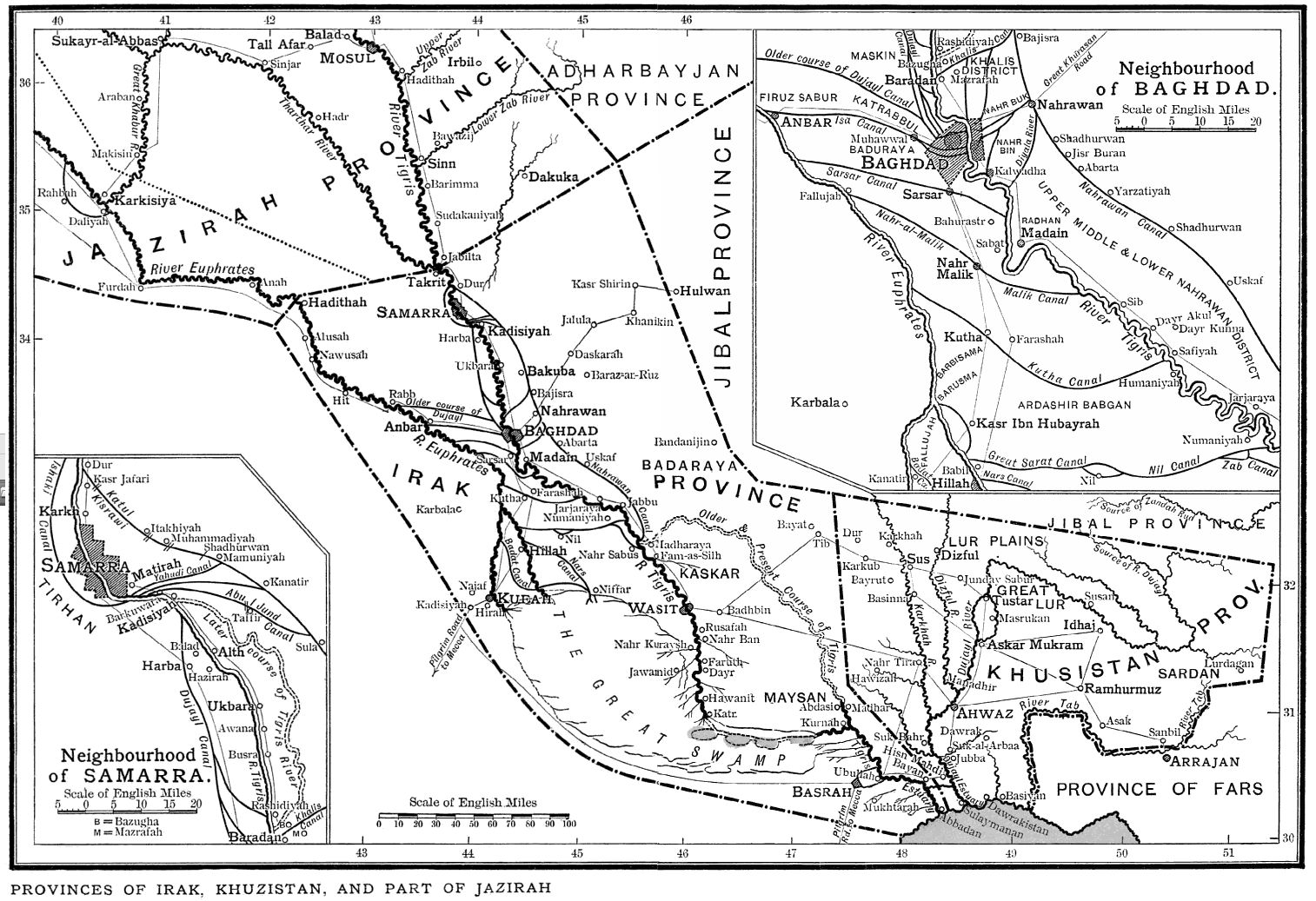
Iraq under the Abbasid Caliphate.

In mid-871, the Abbasid government desired to initiate a new offensive against the Zanj, and sent Bughraj to press Sa'id ibn Salih on the matter. Sa'id accordingly set out for the Tigris in June and advanced toward the headquarters of 'Ali ibn Muhammad, eventually reaching the Nahr Ma'qil. There he encountered a rebel army on a tributary canal, and despite being wounded he succeeded in routing the Zanj. The victorious government troops gained loot and freed a number of women who had been taken captive by the rebels.

After the battle, Sa'id proceeded to set up a new camp and spent several days preparing for further engagements. While there, he received word of a nearby Zanj force, which he attacked and defeated. He next set out for the western side of the Tigris and engaged the Zanj in several skirmishes, after which he returned to his camp and began directing the activities of his army from there.

In mid-July, 'Ali ibn Muhammad decided to strike back against Sa'id, and ordered his lieutenant Yahya ibn Muhammad al-Bahrani to send a contingent against him. The rebel force, which consisted of a thousand men and was commanded by Sulayman ibn Jami' and Abu al-Layth al-Isbahani, proceeded from the Nahr Ma'qil by night and managed to catch the government army unprepared. The Zanj inflicted a severe defeat on Sa'id, killing a large number of his men and setting fire to his camp.

The attack succeeded in bringing an end to Sa'id's campaign. The government troops were extremely disorganized after the battle, and they were unable to make any further advances against the rebels. At the same time, a delay in a scheduled shipment from al-Ahwaz caused further problems, and Sa'id was forced to withhold the allotments for his soldiers as a result. Determining that Sa'id was incapable of continuing the operations against the Zanj, the central government decided to relieve him of his command. He therefore handed over his army to Mansur ibn Ja'far al-Khayyat and returned to Samarra, while Bughraj remained behind to protect Basra against the rebels.

=== Blockade of Basra and campaign of Mansur ibn Ja'far ===
By mid-871 the city of Basra was effectively under blockade from the Zanj. The rebels had been able to largely cut off the flow of supplies to the city, having by this time taken control of several of the surrounding districts and destroying a number of nearby villages. The canals to Basra were also unsafe for travel, and ships attempting to reach the city were vulnerable to attack. The loot seized from ships not only deprived the city of needed provisions, but also provided an important source of supplies for the Zanj. With the rebels closing in on Basra, shortages appeared in the city, and its residents began to suffer from hunger.

Upon taking up his command in the region, Mansur ibn Ja'far attempted to break the blockade of Basra by establishing a convoy system, assigning barges to escort supply ships until they reached the city. This strategy temporarily relieved the Basrans from the shortages that they had been suffering, and also made it more difficult for the rebels to secure provisions for themselves. Once this was accomplished, Mansur decided to go on the offensive and advanced toward the headquarters of the Zanj leader with his troops and barges. The Zanj, however, were prepared for him, and when the government army entered the camp they were ambushed by the rebels. Many of Mansur's men were killed during the fighting, while others attempted to flee by jumping into the Tigris and drowned, and Mansur himself was forced to withdraw. Approximately five hundred severed heads were sent to the camp of Yahya ibn Muhammad at the Nahr Ma'qil and were put on display.

As a result of the defeat, Mansur decided that he was unable to directly engage the Zanj; he therefore refrained from further attacks and instead focused on protecting the Basran supply ships. Following the Zanj advance on Jubba, however, he turned his attention away from the convoys and allowed the ships to go unescorted. The rebels were consequently soon able to cut off the flow of provisions to the city, and supplies once again became scarce for its inhabitants.

=== Sack of Basra ===
In August 871, 'Ali ibn Muhammad decided that the time had come for a full-fledged attack against Basra. Messages were sent to both 'Ali ibn Aban al-Muhallabi, who was then encamped in Jubba, and Yahya ibn Muhammad, who was overseeing the blockade of the city, to combine their forces and coordinate an assault. The two commanders accordingly abandoned their positions and set out for the city.

Despite receiving some notice that the Zanj were advancing against them, the Basrans were in a poor state to defend themselves, having been weakened by the effects of the blockade. As Mansur ibn Ja'far was not in the city, the only government force available was a fifty-strong cavalry force under Bughraj, which was supplemented by the Basran militia under the command of Burayh.

The Zanj began their attack on Basra on September 7. After three days of intense fighting, Bughraj and Burayh decided to abandon the city and fled, allowing the Zanj to enter it unopposed. The rebels proceeded to massacre many of its inhabitants, and plundered and destroyed a large portion of the city.

The devastation on Basra was one of the Zanj's greatest accomplishments during the early stages of the rebellion, and the city's fall was celebrated by 'Ali ibn Muhammad. The Abbasid government, for its part, became more committed to suppressing the rebels, and news of Basra's fate prompted the Abbasid prince Abu Ahmad to go on campaign against the Zanj in the following year.

=== Campaign of Muhammad al-Muwallad ===
In the immediate aftermath of the conquest of Basra, the Abbasid government dispatched Muhammad al-Muwallad against the Zanj. He departed from Samarra on September 20 and established himself in al-Ubulla. The Zanj commander Yahya ibn Muhammad, meanwhile, had withdrawn from Basra following the sack, and set up camp on a nearby canal. After receiving instructions from 'Ali ibn Muhammad, he advanced against al-Muwallad and engaged him in battle.

After ten days of fighting between the two sides, Yahya was reinforced with barges commanded by Abu al-Layth al-Isbahani and ordered a night assault against the government army. The battle continued until the following afternoon, at which point al-Muwallad conceded defeat and withdrew, allowing the Zanj to enter and plunder his camp. Yahya then pursued al-Muwallad as far as al-Hawanit, but eventually decided to let him escape. He therefore proceeded back toward the Basra region, attacking and plundering the villages along his route, before reestablishing his camp on the Nahr Ma'qil.

== 871-872 ==
=== First Abu Ahmad campaign ===
==== Battle at Nahr Abi al-Khasib ====
Around the end of February 872, the Abbasid prince Abu Ahmad ibn al-Mutawakkil, the brother and virtual regent of the caliph al-Mu'tamid, decided to personally go on campaign against the Zanj in response to the recent "atrocities" committed by the rebels. A large and well-equipped army led by himself and Muflih al-Turki accordingly set out from Samarra, intending to fight against 'Ali ibn Muhammad in the Basra region. After first passing through Baghdad, where it was enthusiastically met by the local residents, the army made its way south and eventually reached the Nahr Ma'qil. There they found that Yahya ibn Muhammad and the Zanj forces stationed in the area had fled, so they continued toward the Nahr Abi al-Khasib, to attack the headquarters of 'Ali ibn Muhammad.

The approach of Abu Ahmad and Muflih caught 'Ali ibn Muhammad by surprise, as most of his forces were stationed elsewhere at the time. He urgently sent a message to 'Ali ibn Aban, who had returned to Jubba after the sack of Basra, to hasten back to the Nahr Abi al-Khasib with whatever men he could. 'Ali ibn Aban therefore set out for the Basra region, but he was unable to reach 'Ali ibn Muhammad's headquarters before the arrival of the government forces, and by the time he appeared the battle was already over.

With no reinforcements available to him, 'Ali ibn Muhammad decided to engage the government army on his own, and ventured forth on foot. Abu Ahmad and Muflih, for their part, reached the Nahr Abi al-Khasib on April 1 and ordered their men to attack. The assault on the Zanj headquarters initially instilled a state of panic among the rebel noncombatants, and many women and children drowned while attempting to flee across the canal. Nevertheless, the battle ended in complete disaster for the government forces. Muflih was mortally wounded by an arrow early in the fighting, and soon the army was overwhelmed by the rebels; many men were killed and their heads were collected by the Zanj, while others were taken prisoner, and Abu Ahmad was forced to retreat.

Muflih died of his wound the day after the battle, and his body was returned to Samarra. Abu Ahmad, meanwhile, withdrew to al-Ubulla in order to reassemble his army.

==== Capture of Yahya ibn Muhammad ====
While recovering at al-Ubulla, Abu Ahmad received word that the Zanj commander Yahya ibn Muhammad was heading for the Tigris. He decided to advance to the Nahr Abi al-Asad and establish camp there, in order to cut off the flow of supplies and reinforcements to Yahya. Upon arriving at the canal, he dispatched Tashtimur al-Turki with an army to track down Yahya and defeat him.

Yahya ibn Muhammad's forces, meanwhile, had been progressively weakened since his withdrawal from the Nahr Maqil; an engagement with the forces of Asghajun, the governor of al-Ahwaz, had left many of his men injured, and he was lacking in cavalry after he granted his horsemen leave to return to 'Ali ibn Muhammad's camp. After learning of Abu Ahmad's movements, he abandoned his march toward the Tigris and attempted to withdraw through a swamp, but many of the Zanj fell sick during the journey. After emerging from the swamp, the Zanj vanguard under the command of Sulayman ibn Jami' found their path blocked by barges and troops sent by Asghajun, so they abandoned their own boats and decided to head for the road back 'Ali's camp.

Unaware of the fate of his vanguard, Yahya ordered his men to begin crossing a canal and towing their boats across. During the crossing, however, Tashtimur suddenly arrived with his army on the western side of the canal. Panic broke out among the Zanj, and many of the rebels hurriedly crossed over to the eastern side and escaped. Yahya, left with only a few dozen men, attempted to charge against Tashtimur's position, but the government forces quickly stopped the rebels with a hail of arrows. Yahya was wounded in both his arms and his left leg, and his remaining followers quickly decided to flee. The government troops proceeded to both banks of the canal, where they plundered and burned the boats abandoned by the Zanj.

Despite his wounds, Yahya was able to escape the battlefield. Now completely abandoned by his army, he attempted to head back to 'Ali's camp on a galley, but he found the way blocked by government barges. He therefore decided to continue on foot, but his injuries hampered his progress. His flight was finally brought to an end after an informant revealed his location to some government troops, who captured him and took him to Abu Ahmad.

Yahya's capture was celebrated as a significant achievement by the Abbasids. He was transported to Samarra, where the caliph al-Mu'tamid ordered the construction of a platform near the city racecourses for the rebel commander to be tortured on. On May 22, in an event attended by the caliph and the public, Yahya received 200 lashes, after which his hands and legs were cut off. He was then beaten with swords, drawn and quartered, and finally his body was burned.

==== Withdrawal of Abu Ahmad ====
Following Yahya's capture, Abu Ahmad's camp at the Nahr Abi al-Asad was temporarily crippled by the outbreak of disease, and the government army was forced to wait until the afflicted soldiers had either died or recovered. After the disease had passed, Abu Ahmad ordered his troops to proceed to Badhaward, where he prepared his troops and barges for a new offensive against the Zanj.

Once his forces were ready, Abu Ahmad dispatched several commanders to advance against the Nahr Abi al-Khasib, while he remained behind with a handful of his troops. As the battle began, the government army was able to burn several of the rebels' dwellings and free a number of female captives, but the superior numbers of the Zanj eventually prevailed. Abu Ahmad's own position came under attack, and he eventually gave the signal for retreat. Most of the government troops were able to extract themselves, but a detachment of men was cut off from the barges and ambushed by the rebels; 110 men were killed and their heads were sent to 'Ali ibn Muhammad.

After the battle, Abu Ahmad made his way back to Badhaward, where he prepared for another advance against the Zanj. Before long, however, a wind storm caused a fire to break out in his camp and destroy it, and this brought an end to the campaign. In June or July 872 Abu Ahmad decided to make the return journey to Wasit, and upon reaching the city the majority of his troops dispersed.

== 872-875 ==
=== Campaign of Musa ibn Bugha ===
In 873, following the Zanj's occupation of Suq al-Ahwaz, the central government decided to appoint the general Musa ibn Bugha al-Kabir to direct the war effort against the rebels. On September 14, a public procession for Musa's departure was held; the caliph accompanied Musa through Samarra, and rewarded him with robes of honor at the city walls. Musa then departed to take up his command, and sent 'Abd al-Rahman ibn Muflih to al-Ahwaz, Ishaq ibn Kundaj to Basra, and Ibrahim ibn Sima to Badhaward to fight against the Zanj.

Ibn Muflih was soon able to make progress in al-Ahwaz, forcing the Zanj commander 'Ali ibn Aban to withdraw from the province and return to Iraq. Once this was accomplished, Ibn Muflih advanced to Bayan, whereupon the two sides became stuck in a period of stalemate. Ibn Muflih and Ibrahim ibn Sima began to launch successive attacks against 'Ali ibn Muhammad's headquarters, while Ishaq ibn Kundaj worked to cut off the flow of supplies to the rebels; in response, 'Ali ibn Muhammad began sending out his forces to hold off the government armies, after which he would send a detachment to the outskirts of Basra, where Ishaq ibn Kundaj would fight them off. This series of attacks and counterattacks continued for ten months, until Musa ibn Bugha was replaced with Masrur al-Balkhi in mid-875.

== 875-877 ==
=== Occupation of al-Batihah and Dast Maysan ===
Map of the Bata'ih region (orange).

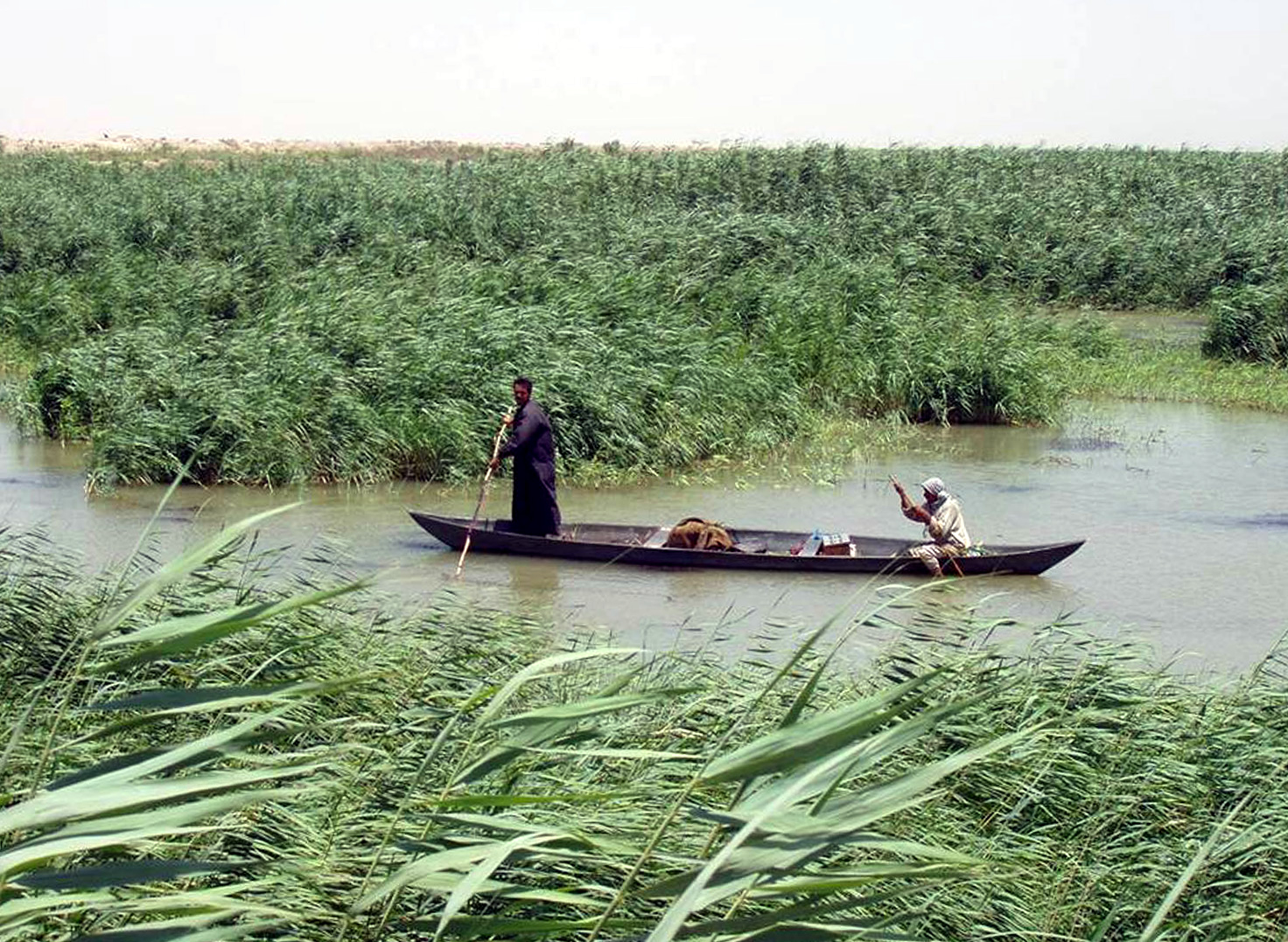
The wetlands of southern Iraq.

Map of the canals to the south of Wasit: 1. (A)ban; 2. Quraysh; 3. al-Sib; 4. Barduda.

The invasion of Iraq by the Saffarid amir Ya'qub ibn al-Layth in early 876 provided the Zanj with a new opportunity to advance to the north. In order to stop the Saffarid army, the caliphal general Masrur al-Balkhi had been obliged to withdraw from the region of Wasit and recall his troops from the Tigris districts. This allowed him to join up with the main Abbasid army and halt Ya'qub's advance at the pivotal Battle of Dayr al-'Aqul, but in the process he had left the region south of al-Mada'in vulnerable to the Zanj, allowing them to expand without major hindrance.

Even prior to Masrur's withdrawal, the campaign against the rebels had suffered several recent setbacks. The government officer Musa ibn Utamish, stationed at al-Badhaward, had suffered losses at the hands of the Zanj commander Sulayman ibn Jami'; when Musa was consequently replaced by Ju'lan al-Turki, a certain Tha'lab ibn Hafs attacked and inflicted casualties on his cavalry and men. 'Ali ibn Muhammad, meanwhile, dispatched Ahmad ibn Mahdi al-Jubba'i with a fleet to the Nahr al-Mar'ah, which advanced to the neighborhood of al-Madhar and proceeded to plunder and destroy the villages in the area.

After returning to the Nahr al-Mar'ah, al-Jubba'i informed the Zanj leader that the region of the marshlands (al-Batihah was undefended by government troops, on account of their withdrawal by Masrur. The Zanj leader therefore decided to send his own forces into it and ordered Sulayman ibn Musa al-Sha'rani and Sulayman ibn Jami' to set out, instructing the latter to proceed to al-Hawanit. Al-Jubba'i was also told to go ahead of Sulayman ibn Jami' and establish camp at al-Hawanit, and a local guide was provided to help him navigate the roads and byways of the marshlands.

==== Advances of Sulayman ibn Jami' and al-Jubba'i ====
After receiving his orders from 'Ali ibn Muhammad, Sulayman ibn Musa set out for al-Batihah. On the way he received a message from 'Ali, instructing him to stop a government fleet of thirty barges that was heading for the Zanj leader's headquarters and which had destroyed a village that had made peace with the rebels. Sulayman spent a month dealing with the enemy force, after which he resumed his advance and eventually reached the marshlands.

Al-Jubba'i, meanwhile, advanced until he encountered an army headed by Rumays. Al-Jubba'i defeated him, forcing Rumays to flee and capturing over fifty of his boats. During their retreat, Rumays's men were intercepted by Sulayman ibn Jami' and were again defeated. Several of the men and galleys defected to Sulayman, and told him that area between him and Wasit was clear of any government forces. Trusting in this information, Sulayman was unprepared for an attack by a Abu Mu'adh al-Qurashi, who routed him and captured one of his officers.

Following the battle, Sulayman returned to his camp, where he was informed by the deserters that Abu Mu'adh was the only force defending Wasit. He therefore sent notice to 'Ali ibn Muhammad and set out for the Nahr Aban. Abu Mu'adh attempted to block his way, but in the resulting battle he was forced to retreat. The way to the Nahr Aban now cleared, Sulayman proceeded toward it and began burning and plundering and taking women and children captive. A government detachment, however, eventually intercepted him and killed a large number of his men, and Sulayman and al-Jubba'i were compelled to flee back to their camp.

==== Withdrawal from al-Hawanit ====
Upon being informed that Masrur al-Balkhi had departed from Wasit and was heading in his direction, Sulayman grew concerned that his position was exposed to attack by land and water. After consulting with his men, he decided to transfer to the area of Nahr Tathitha, which had dense thickets and an escape route back to the central Zanj camp. This move successfully threw the government forces off of his trail; upon Masrur's arrival he only found Sulayman's deserted camp, and attempts to locate the rebel's new position were unsuccessful.

After arriving at his new location, Sulayman sent notice of his movements to 'Ali ibn Muhammad, who approved and ordered him to send any food supplies and animals back to the central Zanj camp. This caused a dispute to break out between Sulayman, who attempted to send the supplies back on barges, and al-Jubba'i, who believed that any supplies they found should be burned in order to deny their use by the government. Al-Jubba'i began ignoring Sulayman's commands, prompting the latter to write to 'Ali and complain. The Zanj leader therefore intervened and sent orders to al-Jubba'i, instructing him to obey Sulayman and follow his commands.

==== Killing of Khushaysh ====
After receiving word that a government army under the command of Aghartmish and Khushaysh was headed his way, Sulayman prepared his men for battle and sent al-Jubba'i to gather intelligence. Upon learning that the enemy force was only half a farsakh away from his position, he ordered al-Jubba'i to block Aghartmish's and Khushaysh's path and divert them from Sulayman's camp. He then crossed the Nahr Tahitha and ordered his black troops to conceal themselves; at a given signal they were to attack the government army as it passed them along the waterway. In spite of some difficulties, the Zanj attack was successful; Aghartmish's troops were routed and Khushaysh was killed. The rebels pursued Aghartmish back to his camp and seized a number of barges, but Aghartmish was eventually able to recover these.

Following the battle, Sulayman sent Khushayh's head to 'Ali ibn Muhammad, who ordered it to be put on display. Sulayman and al-Jubba'i then proceeded to the district of al-Hawanit. There they encountered a force under one Abu Tamim, who was killed during the fighting. Several of his barges, together with the troops on them, were seized, and news of the encounter was sent by Sulayman to 'Ali.

== 877-880 ==
=== Fighting around al-Hawanit ===
After remaining in the marshlands for some time, Sulayman ibn Jami' wrote to 'Ali ibn Muhammad, requesting that he be allowed to return to the Zanj leader's camp. While waiting for a reply, he learned that a government force under Takin al-Bukhari was stationed in the region. After consulting with al-Jubba'i, Sulayman agreed to an attack and set out for Takin's position. While al-Jubba'i began attacking the government army with his galley, Sulayman's infantry and cavalry waited in ambush. Al-Jubba'i then faked a retreat and led Takin's men into the trap; the surprised government troops were unable to resist and were compelled to flee, with the Zanj pursuing them over a distance of three farsakhs.

Following the battle, Sulayman initially wanted to turn back, but at al-Jubba'i's urging he instead ordered an advance on Takin's encampment, which he reached at sunset. When the attack began, however, the government army put up a fierce resistance, and eventually Sulayman ordered his men to fall back. After spending some time to reorganize his men he ordered another assault, but this time he found that Takin had decided to withdraw and abandon his camp. The Zanj therefore plundered and burned it, and then returned to their own camp. There Sulayman learned that he had received approval from 'Ali to return, so he placed al-Jubba'i in command and set out for the Zanj leader's headquarters, arriving there in January or early February 878.

Sulayman was soon forced to head back to the marshlands, however, when a letter arrived from al-Jubba'i, stating that the latter had been defeated by Ju'lan al-Turki and that two other commanders, Manjur and Muhammad ibn 'Ali al-Yashkuri were attacking villages allied to the Zanj. Upon Sulayman's return, he set out from Tahitha with his forces. He first neutralized Ju'lan by sending al-Jubba'i to set up a position opposite him; al-Jubba'i was ordered to make his presence known, but to refrain from battle. Once this was done, Sulayman advanced with the rest of his army and attacked Muhammad ibn 'Ali. The resulting engagement was a major victory for Sulayman, who defeated Muhammad and seized a large amount of booty.

Sulayman spent the next several months on the offensive, attacking enemy villages and successively defeating several government commanders sent to stop him. By July 878, he had reached the vicinity of al-Rusafa, to the south of Wasit; the government army under Matar ibn Jami' stationed there was defeated and the town was plundered and burned. After this, however, Sulayman decided to temporarily halt his campaign and ordered a return to 'Ali ibn Muhammad's headquarters, which he reached on August 8.

=== Occupation of Wasit, al-Nu'maniyyah and Jarjaraya ===
Map of the Wasit (yellow) and Baghdad (green) regions.

Following Sulayman's departure, a government army under Matar ibn Jami' undertook a raid against Zanj villages, advancing to within two and a half farsakhs of Tahitha. Word of this expedition was sent by al-Jubba'i; in response, Sulayman to again set out for the marshlands, arriving on August 31. He spent the remainder of the year there, and continued to score victories against various government forces stationed in the region.

Toward the beginning of 879, Sulayman ibn Jami' decided to make a new advance and set out with his elite commanders and troops. He first encountered Takin al-Bukhari at al-Shadidiyyah on the Nahr Barduda, and despite suffering substantial losses he defeated him and seized his barges. News of this engagement caused Ahmad ibn Laythawayh, who had been appointed as governor of the region, to advance to al-Shadidiyyah himself. The resulting battle went on inconclusively for two days, but on the third day Sulayman drew out Ibn Laythawayh's by ordering his men to fall back. The Zanj then turned around and defeated the government army; Ibn Laythawayh was thrown into the Nahr Barduda and only narrowly escaped being drowned.

Following the victory against Ibn Laythawayh, Sulayman decided to assault Wasit itself. After requesting and receiving reinforcements from 'Ali ibn Muhammad, he advanced toward the city and attacked its governor Muhammad al-Muwallad. The latter was defeated and the Zanj proceeded to enter Wasit. Despite encountering resistance from a government force that held out until the afternoon, Sulayman's well-coordinated troops successfully occupied the city. A large number of people were killed and Wasit was plundered and burned. Afterward the rebels departed from the city and headed in the direction of Junbula' between Wasit and al-Kufa, causing despoliation and destruction on the way.

Sulayman spent most of the next month stationed in the district of Junbula', during which time he focused on digging a canal that would enable the shipment of supplies to his camp. Any hopes of maintaining this forward position, however, were dashed when Ibn Laythawayh undertook a damaging attack against the Zanj; several of Sulayman's commanders were killed and his boats were killed. Sulayman was forced to retreat back to Tahitha, which he reportedly stayed in for most of the remainder of the year.

The year 879 marked the northernmost advance of the rebels; Jabbul was entered and al-Nu'maniyyah was burned. The Zanj also reached Jarjaraya, which caused the residents of the Sawad region to seek refuge in Baghdad.

== 880-883 ==
=== Campaign of Abu al-'Abbas ===
==== First battle, entry into Wasit ====
The fall of Wasit in 879 finally convinced the Abbasid government of the need to devote more resources against the rebels. The caliphal regent Abu Ahmad (who by now was known by his honorific of al-Muwaffaq) accordingly charged his son Abu al-'Abbas to lead a well-equipped army of some ten thousand cavalry and infantry, together with a number of barges, galleys and ferries, and clear the Tigris districts of enemy troops. Abu al-'Abbas agreed and, after conducting an inspection of his men in late November or December 879 and making his preparations, he set out from Baghdad and headed south.

As he passed through the various towns along the Tigris, Abu al-'Abbas received information from his vanguard concerning the movements of Sulayman ibn Jami', al-Jubba'i and Sulayman ibn Musa. After reaching Fam al-Silh, between Jarjaraya and Wasit, he received word that the rebels were advancing against him; he therefore departed from the main road and changed his course. Soon after he made his first encounter with the advance units of the Zanj. The government troops provoked the rebels into pursuing them with a feigned retreat, and when the rebels approached Abu al-'Abbas he ordered his cavalry and infantry to attack. The Zanj were defeated and forced to withdraw; several prisoners were taken a number of barges and galleys were burned.

Following the battle, Abu al-'Abbas established himself in Wasit. After reciting the Friday prayers there, he again set out and made camp in al-'Umr, one farsakh below Wasit. There he ordered the construction of barges and ordered his men to conduct raids against the rebels.

==== Battles in the marshlands and Dast Maysan ====
A short time after his arrival in al-'Umr, Abu al-'Abbas received word that the Zanj were again planning to attack him, and were approaching his army from three directions. The rebels initially hoped to draw the government troops into an ambush and sent twenty galleys to lure them into the trap, but Abu al-'Abbas ordered his men to hold their positions and not give pursuit. Their ruse having failed, Sulayman ibn Jami' and al-Jubba'i instead decided on a frontal attack, and Abu al-'Abbas responded by ordering his barges and cavalry to advance against the rebels. The battle, which took place in the vicinity of al-Rusafa, ended in another defeat for the Zanj; Sulayman and al-Jubba'i fled, and fourteen barges, as well as the horses of the rebels, were seized.

For twenty days after the battle, the government army made no further encounters with the Zanj. Abu al-'Abbas returned to al-'Umr, while al-Jubba'i set about digging traps on the paths usually taken by cavalrymen. Afterwards, the rebels began to harass Abu al-'Abbas' camp in an effort to provoke an engagement, but this strategy failed to produce the desired result, and no fighting took place for about a month.

Sulayman next decided to request reinforcements from 'Ali ibn Muhammad; once these arrived, al-Jubba'i established his position opposite Abu al-'Abbas' camp. Al-Jubba'i refrained from engaging the government army and retreated whenever it advanced; at the same time, his men began destroying bridges, shooting at horsemen that came within range of their arrows, and set fire to vessels that they caught while out on patrol. After two months of these activities, Abu al-'Abbas decided to attempt to draw out the rebels, and dispatched galleys as bait to lure them into a trap. The Zanj fell for the trick and seized a number of the galleys, whereupon the government army immediately set out against them. In the resulting battle, the rebels lost a number of their galleys to the government troops and were forced to retreat.

Abu al-'Abbas decided to follow up on his victory by scouting out the routes used by the Zanj galleys. He ordered his fleet commander Nusayr Abu Hamzah to go ahead with his barges, and then set ahead in his own boat. Abu al-'Abbas soon became separated from Nusayr, however, and disaster nearly overtook him when a strong Zanj force suddenly appeared on both sides of the canal and attacked his craft. Abu al-'Abbas narrowly escaped from the rebels and returned to al-'Umr. There he ordered three sailors who had left his vessel to seize some cattle be decapitated, and issued a warning that sailors who abandoned their galleys in time of battle would be put to death.

Upon learning that a large Zanj army had assembled at al-Siniyyah below Wasit, Abu al-'Abbas ordered his men to march there. The Zanj force was defeated; some of those who escaped made their way to Sulayman ibn Jami's base of al-Mansura in Tahitha, while others went to Sulayman ibn Musa's fortress of al-Mani'a at Suq al-Khamis. Abu al-'Abbas next made his way to 'Abdasi, where two Zanj commanders were stationed. The rebels there were routed; one of the commanders was killed and the other captured, and a number of female captives held by the Zanj there were freed.

==== Expedition against al-Mani'a ====
After returning to his camp, Abu al-'Abbas resolved to march against Sulayman ibn Musa's stronghold of al-Mani'a. Despite the difficulties in reaching the fortress, which was accessible only by a narrow canal, he set out with Nusayr in the vanguard. Upon reaching the Nahr Baratiq, which led to al-Mani'a, Abu al-'Abbas remained at the mouth of the canal, about two farsakhs from the walls of the fortress, while Nusayr advanced on a road that ran alongside the canal. While positioned at the canal mouth, Abu al-'Abbas's ships came under attack by a rebel ground force, and the two sides fought for most of the morning. Nusayr, meanwhile, initially lost some of his barges to the Zanj, but he soon recovered them and succeeded in setting fire to al-Mani'a and taking prisoners. Abu al-'Abbas then drew out the rebel army with the lure of an exposed barge; the Zanj fell into the ambush and were defeated. Six Zanj galleys were captured and the rebels fled.

After the victory outside al-Mani'a, Abu al-'Abbas returned to al-'Umr, where he remained until the arrival of his father al-Muwaffaq.

=== Return of al-Muwaffaq ===
==== Arrival of al-Muwaffaq, capture of Mani'a ====
In September 880, Abu Ahmad al-Muwaffaq received a report that 'Ali ibn Muhammad had ordered his lieutenant 'Ali ibn Aban, who was then in al-Ahwaz, to march to Iraq with his troops and reinforce Sulayman ibn Jami'. Based on this information, al-Muwaffaq decided that Abu al-'Abbas needed additional support; he therefore resolved to organize an army and personally lead it against the rebels. Departing from the suburbs of Baghdad with his troops and watercraft in October, he made his way to Wasit; there he was met by his son and was apprised of the status of the latter's men.

Al-Muwaffaq and Abu al-'Abbas now combined their forces and set out to fight the Zanj. As they progressed to the south, Abu al-'Abbas came under attack from Sulayman ibn Musa's men, but he defeated them and decapitated the prisoners he took. The government armies then continued on their path until they reached their intended target, Sulayman's stronghold of al-Mani'a. Al-Muwaffaq ordered his son to advance against the city with a flotilla of barges and galleys, while he himself followed with his barges and army. As they approached al-Mani'a, the rebels engaged Abu al-'Abbas in a skirmish; when Sulayman ibn Musa and the Zanj realized the full strength of the forces arrayed against them, however, they decided to abandon the city and flee. Al-Muwaffaq then pursued the rebels to the marshlands, while Abu al-'Abbas' men scaled the walls of al-Mani'a, killed many of its inhabitants and freed several thousand women held captive there. Al-Muwaffaq ordered that the walls of al-Mani'a be razed and that the plunder gained from its conquest be sold off, using the proceeds to pay his troops.

==== Capture of al-Mansura ====
Following the sack of al-Mani'a, al-Muwaffaq paused to gather information on Sulayman ibn Musa and Sulayman ibn Jami'. Upon receiving a report that the latter was at al-Hawanit, he dispatched Abu al-'Abbas to attack him there. Abu al-'Abbas reached al-Hawanit, but instead of finding Ibn Jami' he encountered two of his lieutenants, who were guarding a large food supply. The two sides met each other in battle, and fighting continued until nightfall. Abu al-'Abbas, however, learned from a defector that Sulayman was actually at al-Mansura in Tahitha and forwarded this news to al-Muwaffaq. The latter responded by heading to Barduda, from which led the road to Tahitha.

After conducting repairs on his ferries and equipment, paying his troops and gathering workers and materials for blocking canals and repairing roads, al-Muwaffaq set out from Barduda for Tahitha in late November 880, proceeding on horseback with his cavalry. His army advanced until they came within two mils of al-Mansura. Following a delay of several days due to inclement weather, al-Muwaffaq and a group of his officers went forward to the walls of al-Mansura to search for a place to deploy the cavalry. There, however, they were ambushed by the rebels and heavy fighting broke out. During the battle several government officers were captured by the Zanj, but the rebel commander al-Jubba'i was mortally wounded by an arrow and died a few days later.

Al-Muwaffaq then returned to his camp and prepared his troops for an assault on al-Mansura. Once the preparations were complete, he ordered his infantry, cavalry and watercraft to advance against the city, and sent orders for Abu al-'Abbas to do the same. The government soldiers successfully overcame the defenses of al-Mansura and entered the city from all sides, while the barges and galleys penetrated the city via a canal and proceeded to sink every rebel ship they encountered. Most of the Zanj were killed or captured, while Sulayman ibn Jami' fled with a small group of men. A large number of captive women and children were freed and dispatched to Wasit, and the captured government officers were freed as well. As with the fall of al-Mani'a, a great amount of stores, money, food and cattle were captured from al-Mansura; al-Muwaffaq ordered these sold and disbursed the proceeds to his men.

Al-Muwaffaq stayed in Tahitha for seventeen days following the taking of al-Mansura, after which he ordered that the latter's walls destroyed and its moats filled in. He also established a prize for anyone who managed to capture a Zanj fugitive; any rebel prisoner who was brought to him was treated well and pardoned, thereby enticing them to defect from the Zanj leader. Al-Muwaffaq then dispatched Nusayr Abu Hamzah to pursue Sulayman ibn Jami' and appointed Zirak al-Turki to remain in Tahitha and hunt down any remaining Zanj in the area.

==== Advance on al-Mukhtarah ====
With both al-Mani'a and al-Mansura conquered, al-Muwaffaq returned to Wasit, where he prepared for a march into al-Ahwaz to clear the Zanj from that province. Shortly before departing, Zirak arrived and reported that the area of Tahitha was now secure. Al-Muwaffaq therefore instructed Zirak to head down to the Blind Tigris and meet up with Abu Hamzah Nusayr; the two were then to keep watch over the river and attack any Zanj troops travelling en route to al-Mukhtarah. Following this, al-Muwaffaq departed for al-Ahwaz, and over the course of January and February 881 he restored government control over that region.

While al-Muwaffaq was occupied in al-Ahwaz, Zirak and Nusayr arrived at the Blind Tigris and marched until they reached al-Ubulla. There they learned from a defector that a large Zanj force was occupying the Tigris and was headed for Nusayr's camp on the Nahr al-Marah. Nusayr then returned to his camp; Zirak, however, moved to intercept the rebels and placed himself in a position which he believed they would pass through. When the Zanj arrived he routed them, captured their commander and seized thirty galleys. Zirak then collected the severed heads of the slain and made his way to Wasit, where he informed al-Muwaffaq of the battle. News of Zirak's victory quickly spread, and two thousand rebels soon requested a pardon from Abu Hamzah. This was granted and the men were integrated into the government army.

By mid-February 881, al-Muwaffaq had finished operations in al-Ahwaz and was ready to attack the Zanj headquarters of al-Mukhtarah itself. He therefore set out for the Tigris region in the vicinity of al-Mukhtarah, arriving there on February 19, and also sent instructions to his commanders to meet him at the same place.

=== Capture of al-Mukhtarah, end of the revolt ===
Over the course of the next two and a half years, the government forces under al-Muwaffaq laid siege to 'Ali ibn Muhammad and the Zanj in al-Mukhtarah. During this period, both the besiegers and the besieged engaged in numerous stratagems in an attempt to dislodge the other side, and battles took place both inside and outside the city's fortifications. The rebels mounted a fierce defense, conducting several sorties against the besiegers, attempted to repair damage to their defenses and block government ships by sabotaging canals. By the time of the siege most if not all of the Zanj had returned to the city to reinforce it, and most of the remaining Zanj commanders, including Sulayman ibn Jami', Sulayman ibn Musa, 'Ali ibn Aban, and 'Ali's son Ankalay, participated in its defense.

On the government's side, al-Muwaffaq was in command of an enormous number of men and ships, and his troops used naphtha in an attempt to burn down enemy structures. In addition, he ordered the construction of a new city, al-Muwaffaqiyyah, which provided provisions and other services for his men. Throughout the siege he utilized a carrot and stick approach with the rebels; Zanj troops that voluntarily surrendered were granted guarantees of safety and rewards, and were paraded in front of al-Mukhtarah to convince others to join them, while rebel soldiers that were killed in battle were at times decapitated and their heads were displayed in view of the defenders.

Despite several reverses, including one incident where al-Muwaffaq was seriously wounded in battle, the government forces progressively wore down the defenses of the rebels. The western side of al-Mukhtarah fell in the spring of 883, and the eastern side followed that August. During the final assault by the government army, the rebels were completed defeated and 'Ali ibn Muhammad was killed, bringing the rebellion to a virtual end.

== Aftermath ==
Following the fall of al-Mukhtarah and the killing of 'Ali ibn Muhammad, al-Muwaffaq ordered letters to be written to the centers of the Muslim world, proclaiming that the rebel leader was dead and that the people of Basra, al-Ubulla, the Tigris districts, and al-Ahwaz could return to their homes in safety. Abu al-'Abbas, meanwhile, returned to Baghdad in November 883 and led his troops in a procession through the city; the head of 'Ali was placed on a spear and carried in front of Abu al-'Abbas during the ceremony, allowing the city's residents to see it and celebrate the rebel's death.

Several of the rebel commanders who had surrendered, including Ankalay, 'Ali ibn Aban, Sulayman ibn Jami', and Sulayman ibn Musa, were imprisoned in Baghdad following the end of the revolt, and the household and children of 'Ali ibn Muhammad were brought to the city as well. In 885/886, in response to a Zanj riot in Wasit, al-Muwaffaq ordered that the commanders be decapitated and the heads brought to him. The bodies of those killed were initially dumped down a sewer, but were later retrieved and put on display on the west and east sides of Baghdad.
