= Occupation of al-Ubulla (870) =

- Part of the Zanj Rebellion
- Map of lower Iraq and al-Ahwaz during the Zanj Rebellion.
Date	June 28, 870
Location	Al-Ubulla
Result	Zanj victory

Belligerents
Abbasid Caliphate	Zanj rebels

Commanders and leaders
Abu al-Ahwas al-Bahili	'Ali ibn Muhammad

The Zanj occupation of al-Ubulla (Arabic: دخول الزنج الأبلة) was an event of the Zanj Rebellion, occurring on June 28, 870. Zanj troops dispatched by their leader 'Ali ibn Muhammad advanced against the city of al-Ubulla on the Tigris and launched an attack against it. Despite a defense set up by the Abbasid government to protect the city, it was successfully stormed and taken by the rebels. Much of al-Ubulla was destroyed and many of its inhabitants were killed during the assault.

== Background ==
Following the Zanj victory at the Battle of the Barges, the Abbasid government in Samarra sent a force under the command of Ju'lan al-Turki to put an end to the rebellion. Ju'lan spent the next six months in the field, but he soon found that his mounted troops could not easily move through the dense landscape, and he was unable to make any headway against the Zanj. After the rebels undertook a devastating nighttime raid against his camp, he decided to abandon the campaign and return to Basra. Ju'lan's withdrawal convinced the government that he was unsuitable for the task of defeating the rebels; he was therefore dismissed and his command was given to Sa'id ibn Salih al-Hajib instead.

Ju'lan's withdrawal to Basra and the weakness of the government forces allowed the Zanj to continue their raiding activities in lower Iraq unimpeded. Soon after Ju'lan left the field, the Zanj leader 'Ali ibn Muhammad decided to undertake an expedition against one of the cities of the region. He initially decided to send his troops against 'Abbadan; after his army began their march, however, he was advised that al-Ubulla would be a better target. As a result, he recalled his men and ordered them to head toward that city instead.

== Battle ==
Upon arriving at al-Ubulla, the Zanj found the city to be defended by Abu al-Ahwas al-Bahili, whom Ju'lan had appointed as governor of the city. Nevertheless, the rebels initiated their assault, attacking the city both on land and from commandeered boats. Fighting between the Zanj and defenders continued until the evening of June 28, at which point the Zanj stormed the city from the direction of the Tigris and the al-Ubulla Canal. The defenders were soon overwhelmed, and both the governor and his son were killed during the fighting.

As the Zanj spread throughout the city, they put it to the torch. Many buildings in al-Ubulla were made of teakwood and were constructed close together; as a result, the fire soon spread throughout the city, destroying much of it. Many residents were killed; others attempted to flee into the waterways and drowned. The Zanj then began to plunder al-Ubulla and collected large number of spoils, but by that point most of the city's goods had been destroyed by the flames.

== Aftermath ==
News of the sack of al-Ubulla spread terror throughout the region. The residents of 'Abbadan, fearing that they would suffer a similar fate, decided to surrender to the Zanj. 'Ali ibn Muhammad sent troops to the city, where they were allowed to seize any weapons and slaves that they could find. The people of Basra were also panicked by the news; the fall of al-Ubulla, together with that of al-Ahwaz later that year, caused many to flee the city, moving to safer areas not subject to Zanj attack.

In the same month that the battle took place, Sa'id al-Hajib arrived in Basra to assume command of the war against the Zanj. Although he scored some initial successes against the rebels, he ultimately fared little better than Ju'lan had. The Zanj soon managed to hit his camp with a surprise attack and inflict numerous casualties among his forces; in consequence, he was recalled back to Samarra and forced in turn to give his command to Mansur ibn Ja'far al-Khayyat, who took over the campaign.

The Zanj did not remain in al-Ubulla for long, and by the following year government forces were again stationed in the city. Nevertheless, the fall of al-Ubulla and 'Abbadan to the Zanj cut off the principal trade route to Basra, which soon began to suffer shortages as a result. Combined with a Zanj siege against the city, conditions in Basra quickly deteriorated, allowing the Zanj to conduct an assault against it in the following year.
