= Abu Hilal al-Askari =

Persian poet and Islamic scholar (died c.1010)

Abū Hilāl al-Ḥasan ibn ʿAbdallāh b. Sahl al-ʿAskarī (d. c. 400 AH/1010 CE), known also by the epithet al-adīb ('littérateur'), was an Arabic-language lexicographer and literatus of Persian origin, noted for composing a wide range of works enabling Persian-speakers like himself to develop refined and literary Arabic usage and so gain preferment under Arab rule. He is best known for his Kitāb al-ṣināʽatayn, Dīwān al-maʽāni, and the Jamharat al-amthāl. However, he composed at least twenty-five works, many of which survive at least in part.

== Life ==
Abū Hilāl's epithet al-ʿAskarī indicates that he came from ʿAskar Mukram in the Persian province of Khūzistān. He was taught by his father and the similarly named Abū Aḥmad al-Ḥasan ibn ʿAbdallāh ibn Saʿīd al-ʿAskarī (with whom later scholars sometimes confused him). He was a cloth merchant, and his journeying enabled him to develop a wide knowledge of Arabic-language culture.

Among his poetry are works addressed to the Būyid wazīr al-Ṣāḥib ibn ʿAbbād (d. 385/995); he criticised al-Mutanabbī (d. 354/965). What seems to be his last work, Jamharat al-amthāl, indicates that his previous work, al-Awāʾil, was completed in 395 AH/1005 CE. Al-Suyūṭī reckoned that al-ʿAskarī died around 400 AH/1010 CE.

The preface to al-ʿAskarī's Sharḥ Dīwān Abī Miḥjan al-Thaqafī indicates that this was the first of several planned commentaries on minor poets, but it seems that al-ʿAskarī completed no more of these.

In some of his poetry, al-ʿAskarī complained that his scholarship was not shown the respect it deserved, but medieval biographers characterised his treatise Furūq as ḥasan ('good'), his al-Ṣināʿatayn as mufīd jiddan ('very useful') and badīʿ ('innovative'), and work as a whole fī ghāyat al-jawda ('totally excellent').

In the assessment of Beatrice Gruendler,

Writing in Khūzistān, partly for native speakers of Persian, Abū Hilāl impressed upon them the need to master elevated (ʿulwī), as opposed to colloquial (ʿāmmī), Arabic speech and Arabic writing, for use in poetry, sermons, and epistles ... With his manuals, which are structured systematically, with detailed tables of contents in the prefaces (a format adhered to throughout his books) so that any item can be easily located, he offers aspiring udabāʾ an opportunity to shine in literary and scholarly majālis. Abū Hilāl expected his books to be memorised and cited in learned conversation, with the purpose of social advancement in the reigning Arabic literary culture, fostered by the second generation of Būyid amīrs and their wazīrs.

== Works ==
=== Lexicography ===
- al-Talkhīṣ fī maʿrifat asmāʾ al-ashyāʾ. A thematically arranged thesaurus.
- al-Furūq fī l-lugha (a.k.a. al-Furūq al-lughawiyya). Al-ʿAskarī presents this work as a step to attaining the level of Arabic needed for religious study and a full appreciation of the Qur'an. It disagrees with the claim of previous authorities (such as Sībawayh [d. c. 796 CE], al-Aṣmaʿī [d. 828 CE], and al-Rummānī [d. 994]) that complete synonymity (tarāduf) could exist between words within a single dialect of Arabic. It deploys around 1,200 examples. The work focuses on the speech of fuqahāʾ and mutakallimūn, alongside more common usages. The text was abridged and edited into a question-and-answer format under the title al-Lumaʿ min al-Furūq. Under the title Muʿjam al-furūq al-lughawiyya, the work was also arranged alphabetically and supplemented from the eighteenth-century Nūr al-Dīn al-Jazāʾirī's Furūq al-lughāt.
- al-Muʿjam fī baqāyā l-ashyāʾ maʿa dhayl asmāʾ baqiyyat al-ashyāʾ. A collection of terms denoting different kinds of remainders, aimed at an audience of fuqahāʾ and muḥaddithūn.

=== Poetry ===
Al-ʿAskarī composed poetry of his own, which is partially preserved through citations in al-ʿAskarī's own works and by others in biographical literature; this has been gathered by Muḥsin Ghayyāḍ and George Kanazi.

Al-ʿAskarī also wrote a number of treatises on poetics:

- Kitāb al-Ṣināʿatayn al-kitāba wa-l-shiʿr (originally named Ṣanʿat al-kalām). This was al-ʿAskarī's most influential piece, influencing Ibn al-Athīr's al-Mathal al-sāʾir and abridged by Muwaffaq al-Dīn al-Baghdādī (d. 628/1230) around the thirteenth century CE, and influencing Ibn Ḥijja al-Ḥamawī's Khizānat al-adab in the fifteenth. In the assessment of Beatrice Gruendler, it was 'a foundational text for the state of rhetoric at the close of the fourth/tenth century ... Abū Hilāl was more a perceptive practical critic than a theorist, and his merit is that of assembling the accepted rules and principles of literary criticism in a more coherent, detailed, and comprehensive way than ever before ... Nonetheless, he placed prose and poetry on a par for the first time, and he expanded Ibn al-Muʾtazz's list of seventeen tropes (five badīʾ figures and twelve maḥāsin al-kalām) to twenty-nine, some of which he claimed to have invented himself. His most original chapter, even if inspired by the ʿIyār al-shiʿr of Ibn Ṭabāṭabāʾ (d. 322/934), is the one on literary borrowing (sariqa, akhdh, ittibāʿ), which he considered successful so long as the second author concealed the theft by a transfer across genres or between prose and poetry, or if he enriched the wording, the meaning, or both.' The work drew on al-Jāḥiẓ, Qudāma ibn Ja'far and Ibn al-Muʿtazz, along with (without acknowledgement) Ibn Qutayba, Ibn Ṭabāṭabāʾ, and al-Rummānī.
- Dīwān al-maʿānī. A catalogue of literary conceits and motifs — the first maʿānī written in Arabic from the perspective of literary criticism rather than lexicography. Al-ʿAskarī reproduced this text in individual fascicles, each on a specific theme, for ease of reference. The text is also noted as an early source of poetic Arabic riddles.
- Sharḥ Dīwān Abī Miḥjan al-Thaqafī.
- al-Risāla al-māssa fīmā lam yuḍbaṭ min al-Ḥamāsa (a.k.a. al-Risāla fī ḍabṭ wa-taḥrīr mawāḍiʿ min dīwān al-Ḥamāsa li-Abī Tammām).

=== Literature ===
- al-Awāʿil. The first monograph in Arabic on inventions and their inventors in Arabic cultural history (adab).
- Jamharat al-amthāl. An alphabetised collection of turns of phrase (muḥāwarāt), parables, adages, and proverbs — the most comprehensive in Arabic up to that time.
- al-Kuramāʾ (Faḍl al-ʿaṭāʾ ʿalā l-ʿusr).
- al-Ḥathth ʿalā ṭalab al-ʿilm. This excursus on learning reveals much about al-ʿAskarī's pedagogical conception of his writings, focusing on methods of memorisation and learning, and on the purpose of knowledge.
- Kitāb mā iḥtakama bi-hi al-khulafā’ ilā al-quḍāt. In this short book, the author relates a series of cases in which caliphs submitted to a qadi's judgement.
