= Battle of the Barges =

Battle fought on October 24, 869 near Basra

- Part of the Zanj Rebellion
- Map of lower Iraq and al-Ahwaz during the Zanj Rebellion.
Date	October 24, 869
Location	Shaytan canal, near Basra
Result	Zanj victory

Belligerents
Zanj rebels	Abbasid Caliphate: Local Basran militia

Commanders and leaders
'Ali ibn Muhammad 'Ali ibn Aban; Zurayq; Abu al-Layth al-Isbahani; Shibl ibn Salim; Husayn al-Hammami	Kuş Temur (surrendered)

Strength
At least 1,500	Unknown

The Battle of the Barges or Day of the Barges (Arabic: يوم الشذا Yawm al-Shadhā) was fought on October 24, 869 near Basra. It was one of the first major engagements of the Zanj Rebellion, taking place less than two months after the outbreak of the revolt.

The battle was the culmination of several weeks of fighting between the Zanj rebels and local defenders in the villages and canals of southern Iraq. A large army of volunteers from the city of Basra that had set out to quell the Zanj was ambushed and defeated by the insurgents. Almost all of the Basran soldiers, together with a number of civilians that had accompanied them, were killed during the fighting. The battle was a major victory for the Zanj, and it forced the Abbasid government to take a more direct role in the campaign against the rebels.

== Background ==
The Zanj Rebellion had begun in early September 869, in the region of southern Iraq. It was led by one 'Ali ibn Muhammad, who had previously led failed attempts against the government in al-Bahrayn and Basra. 'Ali was able to quickly gather a major following, especially among the black slaves who had been employed to cultivate the lands in the area of the modern Shatt al-Arab. Soon after the proclamation of the rebellion, the Zanj spread out among the districts of the lower Tigris and Karun rivers and advanced against several of the villages in the region. Some villages secured agreements with the Zanj; others resisted and were attacked and plundered as a result.

In the early stages of the rebellion, the defense of the towns of lower Iraq was largely handled by provincial garrisons, local volunteers and slaves, with the central government in Samarra initially contributing little or no troops to stop the Zanj. Militia groups composed of men from Basra, al-Ubullah and other towns were soon organized, and set off to fight off the Zanj in an attempt to protect their communities and property. Over the course of late September and early October, these groups engaged the Zanj in several battles, but they were usually defeated by the rebels. At the same time, 'Ali ibn Muhammad's forces continued to grow, and soon numbered in the thousands.

== Zanj advance toward Basra ==
By mid-October, the rebels had gathered sufficient strength to attempt an advance on Basra. Approaching the city from the southeast, the Zanj soon encountered two regiments consisting of soldiers, Arab tribesmen and men from the factions of Basra. 'Ali ibn Muhammad divided his forces, sending 'Ali ibn Aban with a large contingent to fight the first group near the Riyahi canal, while Muhammad ibn Salm was dispatched to fight the second regiment at the village of al-Ja'fariyyah. Both 'Ali ibn Aban and Muhammad ibn Salm engaged the enemy troops and emerged victorious; they forced the government loyalists to retreat and inflicted numerous casualties on them.

'Ali ibn Muhammad and the Zanj next advanced to the salt flats near al-Ja'fariyyah. On the morning of October 22 he gathered his followers and warned them not to make a premature attack on Basra. Despite this, several of his men enthusiastically pressed on ahead, but they were met by a large group of Basrans. Upon receiving this news, 'Ali sent reinforcements and set up camp near them. The Basran army then attacked the Zanj, and after some heavy fighting inflicted a severe defeat upon them. Many Zanj, including several commanders, were killed and the rest were forced to flee. Cut off from his men, 'Ali ibn Muhammad was unable to reestablish order and only narrowly avoided being killed himself.

Following the rout, 'Ali ibn Muhammad retreated to a place called al-Mu'alla on the Shaytan canal. There he took a headcount and discovered that only five hundred of his men had returned; the rest had fled. He stayed at al-Mu'alla overnight, and in the following morning he inspected the troops again, finding that a thousand more men had returned during the night. After reprimanding one of the men who had failed to immediately return to the camp, he dispatched Muhammad ibn Salm to speak to the Basrans and attempt to garner support among them. This proved to be unsuccessful; when Muhammad began to speak to the hostile Basran crowd, the latter immediately attacked and killed him.

== Battle ==
Encouraged by their success against the Zanj, the Basrans organized a fresh army to fight the insurgents again. The force consisted of archers and volunteers from the various city factions; Hammad al-Saji, a veteran sailor, was appointed to lead the expedition. The archers were loaded onto three river barges which set out for the Zanj camp on the Shaytan canal on October 24. They were accompanied by a number of galleys, together with a large group of people traveling on foot along the canal banks. Some of the crowd were armed with weapons, but others were unarmed and merely intended to watch the upcoming battle.

The advance of the Basran army was quickly reported by 'Ali ibn Muhammad's scouts, who returned to the Zanj camp to deliver the news. After being apprised of the situation, 'Ali deployed his forces, intending to set up an ambush for the enemy. A detachment under the command of Zurayq and Abu al-Layth al-Isbahani was sent ahead along the east bank of the Shaytan canal, while a second group under Shibl ibn Salim and Husayn al-Hammami advanced along the west bank. The remaining troops were put under the command of 'Ali ibn Aban and were ordered to face the enemy head on. The two detachments along the canal banks were to remain in hiding and allow the Basrans to pass by them; once 'Ali ibn Aban's men had engaged the enemy, they were to attack the Basrans from behind. The Zanj women were ordered to gather rocks and supply them to the men during the fighting.

The Basran army soon appeared in sight of the Zanj, the large size of the force causing consternation among the troops. Nonetheless, the Zanj remained in position and prepared to fight the enemy. 'Ali ibn Aban's men were under orders to refrain from attacking the Basrans until the enemy was close enough to brandish their swords at them. They remained in a crouching position facing the Basran army and hid behind their shields as they approached.

When the Basrans came close enough to 'Ali ibn Aban's troops, the Zanj initiated their attack. The ambushers then emerged from their hiding places and fell upon the enemy from the rear, indiscriminately attacking the foot soldiers and unarmed people alike. Attacked from all sides, the Basrans were soon overwhelmed. The barges and one of the galleys were overturned, causing the fighters on them to drown. A number of men attempted to stand their ground against the attackers, but they were soon defeated and killed. Faced with the Zanj onslaught, many of the people on shore attempted to flee into the canal, but were either slain or drowned. The battle continued until almost the entire Basran force was annihilated; only a few managed to escape the rout.

== Aftermath ==
Following the battle, 'Ali ibn Muhammad ordered the Zanj to collect the heads of the slain. He put them on display, and allowed the families of the dead to collect the heads of their kin. The remaining heads were then put on a boat, which was cast off to float back to Basra.

Several of the Zanj were eager to follow up on their victory and urged 'Ali ibn Muhammad to march on Basra itself. 'Ali, however, rejected this advice as imprudent and counseled his followers that they should instead force the enemy to seek them out. He then withdrew to a safe area and ordered his men to build huts for a camp. The Zanj resumed their raiding activities, attacking the surrounding villages and stealing property.

News of the battle reportedly provoked outrage among many Muslims. Not only were a large number of Basrans killed, but several notable people, including Hashimites and veteran fighters, were among the dead. Several poets commemorated the battle in their works.

Al-Tabari, who was a contemporary of the rebellion, appears to have been personally shocked by the massacre of the Basrans. In his narrative of the revolt, he had previously referred to 'Ali ibn Muhammad simply as the Zanj leader; after his account of the battle, however, he abruptly changes his tone, and subsequently refers to the Zanj leader primarily with pejorative terms such as "the abominable one," "the enemy of God" and "the cursed one."

The victory over the Basrans proved that the Zanj were too strong to be defeated by local regiments and volunteers alone. Following the battle, the Basrans ceased their campaigns against the rebels. The alarmed residents of the city decided to write to the caliph al-Muhtadi in Samarra, urging him to send government troops to the region. The caliph responded by sending Ju'lan al-Turki with reinforcements to the Basra area, thereby expanding the involvement of central government in the effort to combat the Zanj.
