= Ibrahim ibn Muhammad ibn Isma'il al-Hashimi =

Abbasid governor of Mecca

Ibrahim ibn Muhammad ibn Isma'il al-Hashimi إبراهيم بن محمد بن إسماعيل الهاشمي

Abbasid Governor of Mecca
- In office 873–880s
- Monarch: al-Mu'tamid

Amir al-hajj
- In office 873, 874
- Monarch: al-Mu'tamid

Personal details
- Born: Abbasid Caliphate
- Relations: Abbasid dynasty
- Parent: Muhammad ibn Isma'il ibn Ja'far ibn Sulayman ibn Ali al-Hashimi (father)
- Religion: Sunni Islam

Ibrahim ibn Muhammad ibn Isma'il ibn Ja'far ibn Sulayman ibn Ali al-Hashimi (Arabic: إبراهيم بن محمد بن إسماعيل بن جعفر بن سليمان بن علي الهاشمي), known as Burayh (Arabic: بريه), was a ninth century member of the Abbasid dynasty. He was involved in the defense of Basra during the Zanj rebellion, and later served as a governor of Mecca.

== Career ==
Ibrahim was a descendant of Sulayman ibn Ali, the uncle of the first two Abbasid caliphs al-Saffah and al-Mansur. He appears in 869-870 as one of the individuals who took part in the efforts of Jul'an al-Turki to combat the Zanj rebellion, which was then active in southern Iraq. When the Zanj launched an assault on Basra in late 871, he and the officer Bughraj assumed command of the defenders, but after several days of fighting they decided to flee, allowing the rebels to enter and sack the city unopposed.

Ibrahim was subsequently appointed as governor of Mecca, where he led the pilgrimages of both 873 and 874. In the latter year he participated in a general exodus of residents from the city in response to a severe food shortage, which caused prices to significantly rise for a period of several months.

He later accompanied the future caliph al-Mu'tadid during the latter's campaign against the Zanj in 880.
