= Battle of Basra (871) =

Major engagement of the Zanj Rebellion in the year 871

- Part of the Zanj Rebellion
- Map of lower Iraq and al-Ahwaz during the Zanj Rebellion.
Date	September 7–10, 871
Location	Basra
Result	Zanj victory

Belligerents
Abbasid Caliphate	Zanj rebels

Commanders and leaders
Bughraj; Burayh	Yahya ibn Muhammad 'Ali ibn Aban; Rafiq

Casualties and losses
Likely above 10,000 (including civilians)	Unknown

The Battle of Basra was a major engagement of the Zanj Rebellion, fought on September 7–10, 871. Zanj rebels and allied Arab tribesmen, led by Yahya ibn Muhammad al-Azraq and 'Ali ibn Aban al-Muhallabi, launched a coordinated attack against the city of Basra. The city’s defenders, consisting of a small contingent of Abbasid regular troops and local Basran militia, were quickly overwhelmed, and the Zanj were able to enter the city, after which they massacred its inhabitants and engaged in a several-day period of looting.

The historian Alexandre Popovic has called the battle "the most outstanding event of this whole period if not of the entire [Zanj] revolt." The total loss of life and damage to the city is unknown, but Muslim historians have generally described the incident as being extremely destructive. Following the battle, the Abbasid government intensified its efforts to suppress the Zanj, and in the following year the caliphal regent Abu Ahmad personally went on campaign against the rebels.

== Background ==
In the two years since the outbreak of the revolt in September 869, the Zanj had successfully spread throughout the districts of lower Iraq and al-Ahwaz, bringing much of the region under their control. The rebels attacked cities and towns with virtual impunity; they had conquered al-Ubulla, Jubba and al-Ahwaz and received the voluntary submission of 'Abbadan. Rather than attempt to hold the cities that they captured, the Zanj generally opted to pillage and abandon them, after which they would move on to their next target.

After mid-870 the leader of the rebellion, 'Ali ibn Muhammad, was no longer personally leading the Zanj armies into battle; he instead resided in his newly built city, al-Mukhtara, and issued orders to his military commanders in the field. Among his chief lieutenants were 'Ali ibn Aban al-Muhallabi and Yahya ibn Muhammad al-Azraq, two men who had been in the service of the Zanj leader since before the start of the revolt. By mid-871 'Ali ibn Aban was encamped in the district of Jubba, while Yahya was stationed on the Ma'qil Canal, in the vicinity of Basra.

In an effort to combat the Zanj, the Abbasid central government in Samarra had dispatched a number of commanders, such as Ju'lan al-Turki, Sa'id al-Hajib, and Ibrahim ibn Sima al-Turki to lower Iraq and al-Ahwaz. These men were sometimes able to score a military victory against the rebels, but more often they suffered defeat, and in any case they were unable to effectively hinder the operations of the Zanj throughout the region. In 871 Mansur ibn Ja'far al-Khayyat was appointed as the administrator of Basra and the Tigris districts, but he was similarly incapable of making any headway against the Zanj, and his troops suffered significant casualties at the hands of the rebels.

Due to its proximity to the rebels, as well as its status as a major commercial and cultural center, the city of Basra was a prime target for the Zanj. 'Ali ibn Muhammad had led an aborted revolt in the city in 868, and it was one of his first objectives after the start of the Zanj rebellion in 869. Although the Zanj had failed to take it at that time, a significant number of Basrans were subsequently killed at the Battle of the Barges, and the city was thereafter forced to rely on the Abbasid government to send troops for protection. The fall of al-Ubulla and of al-Ahwaz in 870 further instilled a state of panic in the city, and many of its inhabitants decided to evacuate to safer areas.

== Preparations ==
In order to weaken Basra, the Zanj placed the city under virtual siege, harassing it with attacks day and night and destroying the surrounding villages. They also cut off the supply routes to the city, which soon resulted in a shortage of resources. This was temporarily relieved after Mansur ibn Ja'far began organizing armed escorts for supply ships; by mid-871, however, the operation of the convoys had largely fallen apart and supplies for the inhabitants again became scarce. Hunger and disease broke out, and fighting erupted between the city factions.

By late August 871, 'Ali ibn Muhammad decided that Basra had been reduced to the point where a full-fledged assault was possible, and began preparing for an attack. A message was sent to 'Ali ibn Aban, recalling him from Jubba and ordering him to proceed against the city, while Yahya ibn Muhammad, who was then conducting the blockade, received a similar command. A man was sent to the nearby Arab tribes in an effort to convince them to join the attack; many of them agreed to do so and a second man was sent to train them for the operation. 'Ali ibn Muhammad was also encouraged by his astrologers' predictions that a lunar eclipse would occur on September 4; he began speaking to his followers, declaring that he had prayed to God and heard a voice which said that the eclipse heralded the imminent destruction of Basra.

Within Basra, the inhabitants were poorly prepared for an attack, having been significantly weakened by the blockade. Mansur ibn Ja'far himself was not in the city, and he did not participate in the battle. A government force under the command of Bughraj was present, but this consisted of only approximately fifty cavalry. The Basrans themselves had organized their own defense force headed by Burayh, a minor member of the Abbasid family and a resident of the city, but they were heavily suffering from hunger and disunity.

The defenders did receive some forewarning about the impending assault. On August 31 Burayh was informed that the Zanj leader had sent money and supplies into the desert to raise a force among the Arab tribes, and that a combined force of Zanj infantry and Arab horsemen were planning to attack Basra. Approximately a week later, the Arabs in Basra received a warning from members of the Banu Tamim and Banu Asad that were cooperating with the Zanj, informing them that they and the Zanj would be attacking the next day and that they should evacuate their women and children before the city was surrounded. Burayh responded to this news by advancing outside the city and setting up a defensive force at a trench, but when 'Ali ibn Aban approached his position he lost his nerve and returned to Basra, allowing 'Ali to continue toward the city unopposed.

== Battle ==
Map of medieval Basra.

The Zanj divided their forces so that they could attack the city on multiple fronts. 'Ali ibn Aban's troops were split into two contingents; one was placed under the command of Rafiq and ordered to attack the district of the Banu Sa'd, while the other was led by 'Ali himself and headed for the western suburb of al-Mirbad. Yahya ibn Muhammad, for his part, approached the city via the 'Adi Canal, in the direction of al-Khurayba.

The Zanj commenced their assault on the morning of Friday, September 7. The first attack was led by 'Ali ibn Aban, who initially advanced into al-Mirbad. Upon reaching Burayh's palace his troops briefly encountered some resistance, but they were eventually able to compel Burayh to retreat from the site and scatter the defenders. After plundering and burning down the palace the rebels continued their advance, proceeding through Basra via the Mirbad Road; they gradually spread throughout the city, killing and plundering as they went and burning several neighborhoods to the ground.

As the battle continued throughout the day, many Basrans began to fear that the Zanj could not be repulsed. A large number fled to their homes or to the city mosque, defying pleas to fight against the rebels. The Mirbad Road was quickly abandoned, allowing 'Ali and his men to proceed down it without interference. In the Banu Sa'd district, a small group of faction fighters attempted to mount a defense, but they were easily overwhelmed by cavalry and infantry attacks. The government commander Bughraj's forces, supported by several Basrans, were split between al-Mirbad and al-Khurayba, but they were ineffective at halting the rebels' advance.

By Friday evening 'Ali ibn Aban's troops had reached the mosque, which 'Ali ordered to be burned. A group of Basrans, however, ambushed his men, killing several Zanj and forcing them back. Fearing further attacks from the city militia, 'Ali decided to withdraw for the evening, and set up his army camp in a graveyard.

The battle continued over the course of the next two days. The Zanj continued to plunder and burn throughout all of Saturday, although 'Ali ibn Aban's forces remained encamped and did not participate in any fighting. On Sunday morning Yahya ibn Muhammad attempted to launch a fresh assault against the city, but Bughraj and Burayh blocked his way and forced him to retreat, and he spent the rest of the day holding his ground.

On Monday, Yahya made another approach. This time, however, he found that both Bughraj and Burayh had fled with their troops; consequently the organized resistance had collapsed, and he was able to enter the city unopposed. A local notable, the Muhallabid Ibrahim ibn Yahya, met with him to discuss the terms of surrender, and Yahya agreed to issue a promise of protection for the city's residents.

== Massacre and looting ==
After securing the protection guarantee, Ibrahim ibn Yahya dispatched a crier to proclaim that anyone who presented themselves at his palace would fall under the agreement. Many Basrans obliged, thronging in front of his palace and in the city squares. Yahya ibn Muhammad also ordered one of his companions to collect a number of ovens, which the people assumed would be used to prepare food for them, as they were suffering from hunger.

Upon seeing the multitude that had gathered, however, Yahya ordered his troops to surround the crowd and blockade the streets and alleys to prevent anyone from escaping. An offer was given for any Muhallabids to enter the palace, after which the gates to the building were shut. A signal was then given for the Zanj to slaughter the crowd, and nearly everyone who had assembled was killed. After the massacre was complete, the Zanj spent the morning and afternoon searching for anyone else they could find; anyone who was rich was tortured in order to extract their possessions and then put to death, while the poor were killed immediately. At the same time, the mosque and city port were burned down on the orders of 'Ali ibn Aban, resulting in further casualties and the destruction of goods, merchandise and livestock.

Yahya returned to the city on Tuesday and issued a new offer of safety in an effort to try and lure out anyone who had survived, but no one responded to the appeal. News of the battle and its aftermath reached 'Ali ibn Muhammad, who sanctioned and approved of the massacre. He appointed Yahya in command of Basra, but recalled 'Ali ibn Aban after the latter had shown some leniency toward some residents of the Banu Sa'd district. Yahya stayed in Basra for some time, during which he continued to round up people who had hidden and extracted any wealth he could find. Finally the Zanj leader gave the order for his forces to withdraw, and Yahya departed for the al-Ghutha Canal.

== Aftermath ==
"Go forth, you nobles, light and heavy, against the vile slaves (Zanj);

They managed well their enterprise (the destruction of Basra) whilst you were sleeping – shame, shame upon the sleep of the sleepers!

Make true the belief of (your) brothers (the people of Basra) who had (high) expectations of you, and put their hopes in you (to help them) in all vicissitudes.

Exact vengeance for them, for that will be (grateful) to them as the restoring of their spirits to their bodies."

— Excerpt from a contemporary elegy by Ibn al-Rumi, lamenting the destruction of Basra and exhorting the Muslim community to take revenge on the Zanj.

The battle and occupation was greatly destructive for the inhabitants of Basra. The exact death toll is unknown; a figure of 300,000 given by al-Ma'sudi has been rejected by modern historians as excessive, while other authors have cited numbers ranging between 10,000 and 20,000. Among the dead were a number of Basra's scholars, such as the grammarian al-Abbas ibn al-Faraj al-Riyashi, Zayd ibn Akhzam al-Basri, and Abu al-Ala Muhammad al-Bahili. Another scholar, the lexicographer and philologist Ibn Durayd, survived by fleeing to Oman before the battle. A significant portion of the city itself seems to have been destroyed, and much of its wealth was plundered by the rebels.

The capture of Basra was one of the Zanj's greatest accomplishments during the early stages of their rebellion. The Zanj leader 'Ali ibn Muhammad celebrated the victory; he declared that his troops had been assisted by divine intervention, without which "the destruction would not have reached the vast proportions that people speak about." He also began to claim that he was a descendant of the Alid Yahya ibn Zayd, after a large number of Basran Alawites joined his cause. Following Yahya ibn Muhammad's withdrawal from Basra, the Zanj continued to maintain a presence in the city for trade purposes; several religious adherents also remained and continued to meet on certain Fridays until they were declared outlaws.

As a result of the battle and massacre, the Abbasid government increased its efforts to combat the Zanj, but it was unsuccessful in making more than limited progress against them. On September 20, the commander Muhammad al-Muwallad departed from Samarra for the Basra region, where he was quickly defeated by Yahya ibn Muhammad and eventually forced to withdraw. In early 872 Mansur ibn Ja'far was killed in battle with 'Ali ibn Aban's men while defending the district of al-Ahwaz. Around the same time, the caliph's own brother Abu Ahmad ibn al-Mutawakkil decided to campaign against the Zanj and set out for Basra; he was able to capture Yahya, who was sent to Samarra and executed, but the Zanj leader defeated his forces in battle, and the outbreak of disease in his camp compelled him to withdraw by early summer. Thereafter the government scaled back its campaign to defeat the rebels, and contented itself with attempting to stop the spread of the revolt.

== Sources ==
- Arberry, A.J. (1965). Arabic Poetry: A Primer for Students. Cambridge: Cambridge University Press.
- Fück, J.W. (1971). "Ibn Durayd". The Encyclopaedia of Islam, New Edition, Volume III: H–Iram. Leiden and New York: BRILL. pp. 757–758. ISBN 90-04-08118-6.
- Ibn al-Athir, 'Izz al-Din (1987). Al-Kamil fi al-Tarikh, Vol. 6 (in Arabic). Beirut: Dar al-'Ilmiyyah.
- Kennedy, Hugh N. (2004). The Prophet and the Age of the Caliphates: The Islamic Near East from the 6th to the 11th Century (Second ed.). Harlow, UK: Pearson Education Ltd. ISBN 0-582-40525-4.
- Al-Mas'udi, Ali ibn al-Husain (1874). Les Prairies D'Or, Tome Huitieme (in French). Trans. C. Barbier de Meynard. Paris: Imprimerie Nationale.
- Popovic, Alexandre (1999). The Revolt of African Slaves in Iraq, in the 3rd/9th Century. Trans. Léon King. Princeton: Markus Wiener Publishers. ISBN 1-55876-162-4.
- Al-Tabari, Abu Ja'far Muhammad ibn Jarir (1992). Yar-Shater, Ehsan (ed.). The History of al-Ṭabarī, Volume XXXVI: The Revolt of the Zanj. Trans. David Waines. Albany, NY: State University of New York Press. ISBN 0-7914-0764-0.
- Al-Tabari, Abu Ja'far Muhammad ibn Jarir (1987). Yar-Shater, Ehsan (ed.). The History of Al-Ṭabarī, Volume XXXVII: The ʿAbbāsid Recovery. Trans. Phillip M. Fields. Albany, NY: State University of New York Press. ISBN 0-88706-053-6.
