= Ab-i Gargar =

Iranian canal

Āb-i Gargar (known in medieval Arabic as Masruqān) is a canal in Iran. On this canal lies the medieval town of ʿAskar Mukram.
