= Band-e Qir =

Band-e Qir بندقير
- Village
- Location within Iran
- Coordinates: 31°39′04″N 48°53′02″E
- Country: Iran
- Province: Khuzestan
- County: Shushtar
- Bakhsh: Central
- Rural District: Miyan Ab

Population (2006)
  - Total: 446
- Time zone: UTC+3:30 (IRST)
  - Summer (DST): UTC+4:30 (IRDT)

Band-i Qīr (Persian: بندقير, meaning 'bitumen dam', also Romanized as Band-e Qīr, Band-e Qir, and Band Qīr; also known as Bid Ghir) is a village in Miyan Ab Rural District, in the Central District of Shushtar County, Khuzestan Province, Iran. At the 2006 census, its population was 446, in 73 families.

== History: Rustam Kuwādh and ʿAskar Mukram ==
Band-i Qīr lies on or adjacent to two earlier settlements. In the Sāsānid period, the town Rustam Kuwādh (also spelled Rostag Kavad) flourished at the site. Rustam Kuwādh was destroyed during the Arab/Muslim conquests of the seventh century CE.

Around this time, ʿAskar Mukram (Arabic: عسکر مکرم, whose name means 'Mukram's encampment') was founded nearby, near the confluence of the canal Āb-i Gargar and the river Kārūn. Although the early history of the settlement is obscure (with the early accounts of al-Balādhurī and al-Ṭabarī conflicting), the tenth-century Ḥudūd al-ʿālam describes the town as large and prosperous, lying on both sides of the Āb-i Gargar. A Būyid mint was based there at the same time. Later in the Middle Ages, however, the town fell into disuse. Noted inhabitants included Abū Hilāl al-ʿAskarī (d. after 1009).

The extensive ruins of ʿAskar Mukram remain at Band-i Qīr.
