= Beatrice Gruendler =

German Arabist, born 1964

- Born: 24 August 1964 (age 61); Offenburg, West Germany
- Citizenship: German
- Education: PhD Harvard University 1995
- Occupation(s): Professor of Arabic language and literature
- Notable work: The Rise of the Arabic Book
- Awards: Leibniz Prize 2017
- Website: Official website

Beatrice Gruendler (German spelling: Gründler) is a German Arabist, professor of Arabic Language and Literature at the Free University of Berlin and former president of the American Oriental Society. Her research has included studies on the history of the Arabic book, the connection between Arabic and premodern literatures in languages such as Hebrew, Syriac and Latin and the role of Arabic literature as a link between West Asia and Europe.

Gruendler has been honoured for her scholarship with the German Leibniz Prize and an honorary doctorate by Leiden University. In 2025, her work The Rise of the Arabic Book was shortlisted for the prestigious Sheikh Zayed Book Award.

In 2017, the German Research Foundation wrote that her "approach puts into practice in an exemplary way the encounters between Arabic and European knowledge traditions."

== Life and career ==
Gruendler studied Arabic language and literature, Semitic Studies, and Assyriology at the University of Strasbourg, France, University of Tübingen, Germany, and Harvard University, U.S., where she completed her doctorate in 1995 in Near Eastern Languages and Civilisations. After a visiting professorship at Dartmouth College, New Hampshire, she taught from 1996 at Yale University, first as assistant professor and, from 2002, as full professor of Arabic literature. In the academic year 2010–2011 Gruendler was a Fellow at the Berlin Institute for Advanced Study, working on the project The Islamic Age of Communication. In 2014 she returned to Germany, where she has been teaching and conducting research in the department of Semitic and Arabic Studies at the Free University of Berlin.

Gruendler's areas of research include classical Arabic literature and its social context, literary theory in the study of Near Eastern literatures, the history of the Arabic language, Arabic paleography, the history of the Arabic book, and the connection between Arabic and premodern literatures. Gruendler has called Arabic a cosmopolitan language: "In premodern times (i.e. from the seventh to the nineteenth century) Arabic was a learned language, and it served as a medium for many writers of other mother tongues, such as Iranians, Jews, Byzantine Greeks, Visigoths, and others. Arabic assembled the voices of individuals of various ethnic and religious backgrounds. All of these formed part of the Arabic-Islamic commonwealth."

Gruendler was principal investigator of the Friedrich Schlegel Graduate School of Literary Studies and the Berlin Graduate School Muslim Cultures and Societies. There she co-directed with Dimitri Gutas, professor of Graeco-Arabic Studies at Yale University, the project Aristotle's Poetics in the West (of India) from Antiquity to the Renaissance. A Multilingual Edition with Studies of the Cultural Contexts of the Syriac, Arabic, Hebrew, and Latin Translations. Funded by the Einstein Foundation Berlin, this project produced a multilingual edition of Aristotle's Poetics, including research into the cultural context of the Arabic, Hebrew, Syriac and Latin translations.

Since 2015, Gruendler has been researching the history of the text, creation and impact of the collection of fables Kalīla wa-Dimna, which came to Europe from India via the Arab world. Its first Arabic version by Ibn al-Muqaffa' is one of the earliest Arabic prose writings and a central text of Arabic wisdom literature from the 8th century. Further, it was translated into forty languages in Europe and Asia from the Middle Ages to the 19th century and had a decisive influence on European literature. As part of a digital learning and research project, Gruendler created the basis for a critical digital edition of this Mirror for princes. In the subsequent European Research Council project, she has been researching the dissemination and transformation of this work in Arabic and in world literature.

From 2016 to 2017, Gruendler served as president of the American Oriental Society.

== Selected publications ==
=== As author ===
- The Rise of the Arabic Book. Cambridge, Massachusetts: Harvard University Press. 2020-10-13. ISBN 978-0-674-98781-4.
  - Arabic translation by Ibrahim Alfraih: نشأة الكتاب العربي, Riyadh: al-Mana, 2022.
- The Life and Times of Abū Tammām by Abū Bakr Muḥammad ibn Yaḥyā al-Ṣūlī preceded by al-Ṣūlī’s Epistle to Abū l-Layth Muzāḥim ibn Fātik, edition and translation, Library of Arabic Literature. New York and London: New York Press, 2015. ISBN 978-0-8147-6040-6
- Book Culture before Print: The Early History of Arabic Media. The American University of Beirut, The Margaret Weyerhaeuser Jewett Chair of Arabic. Occasional Papers, 2012.
- Medieval Arabic Praise Poetry: Ibn al-Rūmī and the Patron’s Redemption. London: Routledge Curzon 2003. Paperback edition, London: Routledge, 2010. ISBN 978-0-415-59579-7
- The Development of the Arabic Scripts: From the Nabatean Era to the First Islamic Century. Harvard Semitic Studies 43, Atlanta: Scholars Press, 1993. ISBN 1-55540-710-2
  - Arabic translation by Sultân Ma`ânî: Ta'rîkh al-Khutût wa-l-kitâba al-`arabiyya min al-anbât ilâ bidâyat al-islâm. Petra: Bayt al-Anbat, Jordan, 2004.

=== As editor ===
- Fishbein, Michael; Montgomery, James E.; Gruendler, Beatrice, eds. (2022-01-11). Ibn al-Muqaffaʿ. Fables of Virtue and Vice. NYU Press. ISBN 978-1-4798-0653-9.
- Classical Arabic Humanities in Their Own Terms. Festschrift for Wolfhart Heinrichs on his 65th Birthday presented by his Students and Colleagues. Leiden: Brill, 2007
- (with Louise Marlow) Writers and Rulers. Perspectives from Abbasid to Safavid Times. Literaturen im Kontext: Arabisch – Persisch – Türkisch, Vol. 16. Wiesbaden: Reichert, 2004
- (with Verena Klemm) Understanding Near Eastern Literatures: A Spectrum of Interdisciplinary Approaches. Literaturen im Kontext: Arabisch – Persisch – Türkisch, Vol. 1. Wiesbaden: Reichert, 2000

For a complete list of publications, see.

== Awards and recognitions ==
In 2017, Gruendler was awarded the Gottfried Wilhelm Leibniz Prize, Germany's most important research prize, by the German Research Foundation, which commented on this award as follows:

Beatrice Gründler will receive the Leibniz Prize for her studies on the diversity of voices in Arabic poetry and culture. She has been interested in the medium of script and its fundamental importance to Arabic traditions since an early stage in her career, as evidenced for example by her book The Development of the Arabic Script (1993). Through her research she has developed a complex media history of the Arab world, from the introduction of paper to book printing and beyond – indeed, she refers to an ‘Arabic book revolution’. In a pilot project for a critical, annotated digital edition of the Kalila wa-Dimna, begun in 2015, Gründler has unravelled the history of the text, development and impact of this collection of fables, considered one of the earliest Arabic prose works and a central text of Arabic wisdom literature. Gründler's own approach puts into practice in an exemplary way the encounters between Arabic and European knowledge traditions that she investigates in her work – another reason for the importance of her research.

In March 2025, Gruendler's work The Rise of the Arabic Book was shortlisted for the prestigious Sheikh Zayed Book Award. Further, Gruendler was awarded an Honorary Doctorate from Leiden University in the Netherlands in 2023.
