= Zanj Rebellion =

869–883 Revolt against the Abbasid Caliphate

- Map of Iraq and Ahwaz at the time of the Zanj revolt.
Date	869–883
Location	Lower Mesopotamia and Ahwaz
Result	Abbasid victory

Belligerents
Abbasid Caliphate	Persians; Muhallabids; Mamluk; Shiites; Zanj rebels Abd al-Qays; Madhhij; Banu Tamim; Banu Asad; Bahila

Commanders and leaders
Al-Muwaffaq; Al-Mu'tadid; Musa ibn Bugha; Abu al-Saj; Masrur al-Balkhi; Ahmad ibn Laythawayh; Ibrahim ibn Muhammad	Ali ibn Muhammad †; Yahya ibn Muhammad al-Bahrani †; Ali ibn Aban al-Muhallabi; Sulayman ibn Jami' (POW); Sulayman ibn Musa al-Sha'rani (POW); Ankalay ibn Ali ibn Muhammad

The Zanj Rebellion (Arabic: ثورة الزنج Thawrat al-Zanj / Zinj) was a major revolt against the Abbasid Caliphate, which took place from 869 until 883. Begun near the city of Basra in present-day southern Iraq and led by one Ali ibn Muhammad, the insurrection involved both enslaved and freed Africans (collectively termed "Zanj" in this case) exported in the Indian Ocean slave trade and transported to slavery in the Abbasid Caliphate in the Middle East, principally to drain the region's salt marshes. It grew to involve slaves and freemen, including both Eastern Africans and Arabs, from several regions of the Caliphate, and claimed tens of thousands of lives before it was fully defeated.

Several Muslim historians, such as al-Tabari and al-Mas'udi, consider the Zanj revolt to be one of the "most vicious and brutal uprisings" of the many disturbances that plagued the Abbasid central government. Modern scholars have characterized the conflict as being "one of the bloodiest and most destructive rebellions which the history of Western Asia records," while at the same time praising its coverage as being among the "most fully and extensively described campaign[s] in the whole of early Islamic historical writing." The precise composition of the rebels remains a subject of debate, both as regards their identity and as to the proportion of slaves and free among them – available historical sources being open to various interpretations.

== Background ==
Due to the lack of evidence for a prolific slave trade on the Swahili coast during this period and genetic studies, the term Zanj, usually used by Arabs to refer to Bantu peoples of the Swahili coast, is thought in this case to refer to Africans generally (including people from North Africa, Abyssinia, Sudan, West and Central Africa, and the East African coast). Slaves were imported via the Indian Ocean slave trade, or captured, primarily for agricultural labor as part of the plantation economy of the Sawad (southern Iraq). The demand for servile labor during this period was fueled by wealthy residents of the port city of Basra, who had acquired extensive marshlands in the surrounding region. These lands had been abandoned as a result of peasant migration and repeated flooding over time, but they could be converted back into cultivatable status through intensive labor.

Local magnates were able to gain ownership of this land on the condition that they would make it arable. As a result, they acquired large numbers of Zanj and other slaves, who were placed into work camps and tasked with clearing away the nitrous topsoil as part of the reclamation process. Other Zanj were used to work in the salt flats of the Sawad, especially in the area around Basra.

Both the working and living conditions of the Zanj were considered to be extremely miserable. The menial labor they were engaged in was difficult and the slaves appear to have been poorly treated by their masters. Two previous attempts to rebel against these circumstances are known to have occurred in 689–90 and in 694. Both of these revolts had quickly failed and thereafter little is known about their history prior to 869.

Beginning in 861, the Abbasid Caliphate was weakened by a period of severe disorder known as the Anarchy at Samarra, during which the central government in Abbasid Samarra was paralyzed by a struggle between the caliphs and the military establishment for control of the state, including numerous mutinies of unpaid troops sparked by the government's insolvency. During this period, six caliphs swiftly succeeded one another in a series of power struggles until finally ending with al-Mu'tamid gaining the caliphate with the support of Turkish troops. Throughout the 860s the various factions in the capital were distracted by this conflict, resulting in the deaths of several caliphs, army commanders and bureaucrats; the outbreak of multiple troop riots; a damaging civil war in 865–866; a great rebellion of the Kharijites in 866; and the virtual bankruptcy of the government.

The anarchy in Samarra allowed a number of provinces to fall into the hands of rebels, while provincial governors were free to act in an independent manner in the territories assigned to them. The effective loss of provinces, in turn, resulted in a decrease in tax revenues received by the central government, further exacerbating the crisis in the capital and crippling the government's ability to effectively respond to challenges against its authority. This continuing instability greatly facilitated the initial success of the Zanj revolt, as the government proved incapable of committing sufficient troops and resources to subdue the rebels.

== Ali ibn Muhammad ==
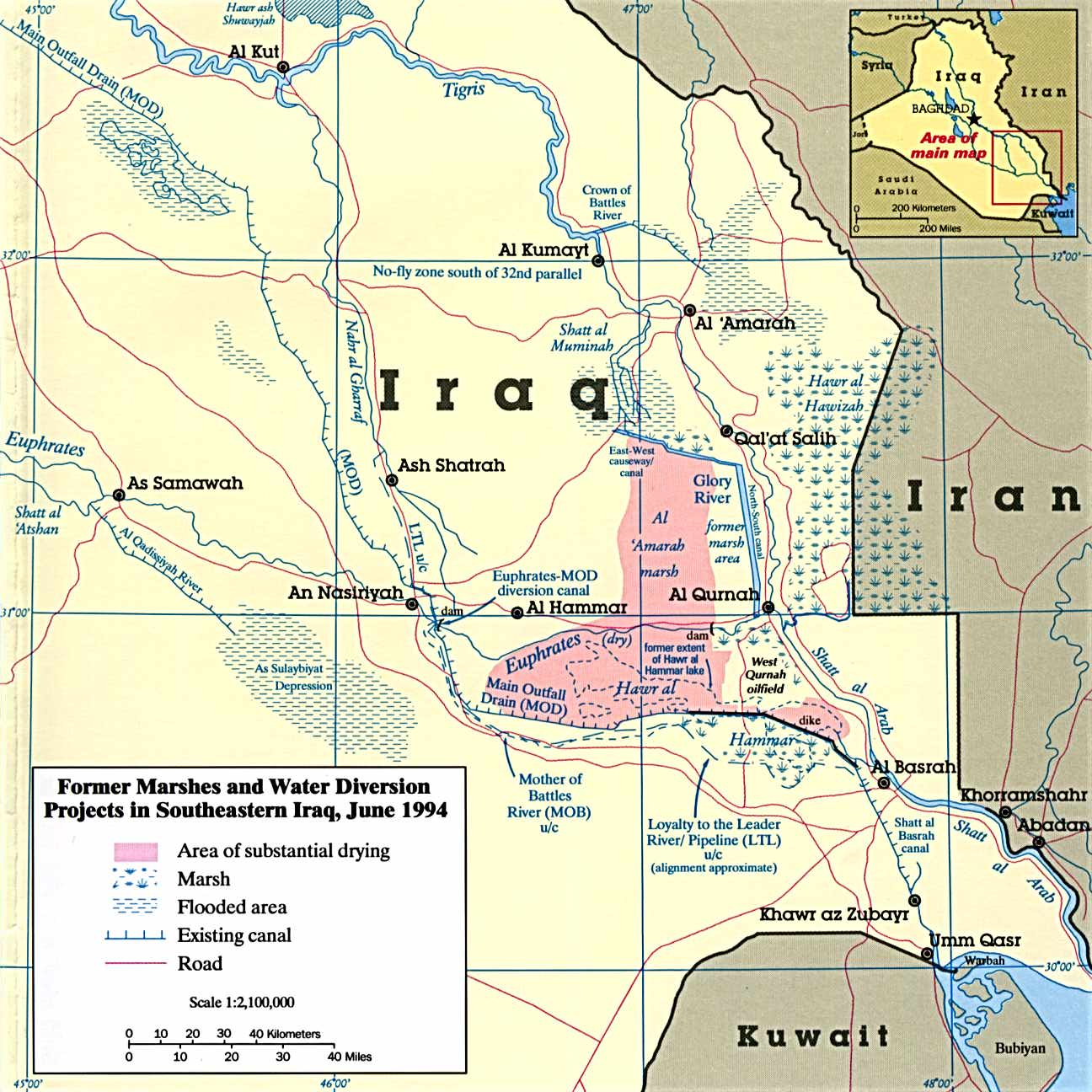
A modern map of the Mesopotamian Marshes.

The leader of the revolt was Ali ibn Muhammad. Little is known about his family or early life because of the scarcity of information and conflicting accounts of his ancestry. According to a genealogy reported by al-Tabari, his name was Ali ibn Muhammad ibn Abd al-Rahim. His paternal grandfather, Abd al-Rahim, was said to belong to the Arab tribe of Abd al-Qays, although he had been born in al-Taliqan, while Ali's mother, Qurrah, belonged to Banu Asad ibn Khuzaymah. Gwyn Campbell states that, although Ali was born near Rayy in Persia, he belonged through his paternal lineage to Abd al-Qays, a tribe of eastern Arabian origin. Philip Grant similarly describes him as probably an Arab from the village of Warzanin near Rayy.

Regardless of his origins, Ali appears to have spent at least a part of his youth living in the area of Rayy, and at an unspecified date he moved to the Abbasid capital of Samarra, where he mixed with some of the influential slaves of Caliph al-Muntasir (r. 861–862). In 863, he made his way from Samarra to Bahrayn (Eastern Arabia), where he pretended to be Shia and started to rouse the people into rebellion against the caliphate. Support for his cause quickly grew. A large number of Bahranis submitted to his authority and the kharaj (land taxes) were collected in his name. Despite this, his rebellion eventually failed due to opposition from the local inhabitants, whereupon Ali abandoned the region and relocated to the city of Basra in the Sawad in 868.

In Basra, Ali sought to take advantage of disturbances caused by the city's rival groups, the Bilaliyyah and Sa'diyyah, and attempted to secure the support of one of the factions. Eventually he proclaimed a new revolt, but no one in the city rallied to his side and he was forced to flee to the Mesopotamian Marshes. There he was arrested by the provincial authorities and sent to Wasit. He was quickly able to secure his freedom and went to Baghdad, where he remained for the next year. During his time in Baghdad he claimed to be a Zaydi by being related to the grandson of Zayd ibn Ali and won over additional followers for his movement.

When Ali heard news about another scuffle between Basra's factions in 869, he returned to the region and "began to seek out black slaves working in the Basra marshes and to inquire into their working conditions and nutritional standards." He began a campaign to liberate and recruit Zanj and other slaves, promising them wealth, affluence and prosperity in exchange for their support. A trifling number of people quickly joined his cause, and Ali soon came to be known by the title Sāhib az-Zanj, meaning "Chief of the Zanj". However, Ali's movement attracted not only Zanj but many other people of different social groups. These included "semi-liberated slaves, clients of prestigious families, a number of small craftsmen and humble workers, some peasantry and some Bedouin peoples who lived around Basrah."

While he was gaining followers for his rebellion, Ali adopted slogans of the egalitarian doctrine of the Kharijites, who "preached that the most qualified man should reign, even if he was an Abyssinian slave." He inscribed his banner and coins with Kharijite expressions and started off his Friday sermons with the slogan, "God is great, God is great, there is no God but God, and God is great; there is no arbitration except by God" (lā ḥakama illāllāh, walā ḥukma illā lillāh), which was "the war cry used by the Kharijites when they defected from the ranks of Ali during the Battle of Siffin". At the same time, however, Ali did not completely abandon the pretense of being an Alid and maintained the claim that he was a Zaydi.

== Revolt ==
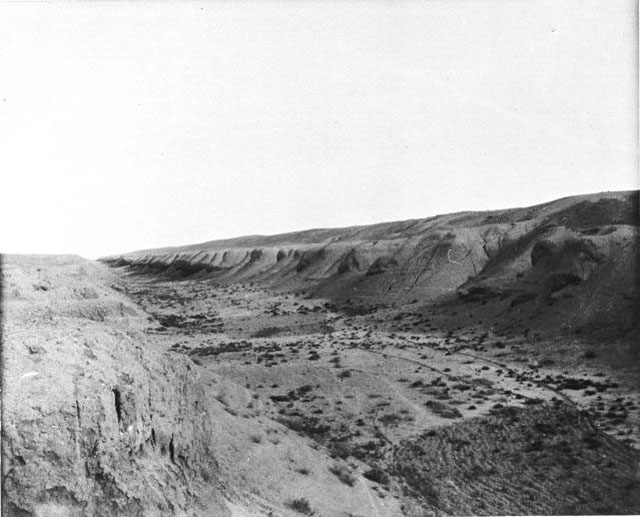
The dry bed of the Nahrawan Canal in central Iraq. Riverine warfare on the regional waterways was a major aspect of the revolt

The revolt, which began in September 869, was concentrated in the districts of Iraq and al-Ahwaz (modern Khuzestan Province) in the central regions of the Abbasid Caliphate. Over the course of the next fourteen years, the Zanj were able to combat the superior arms of the Abbasid government by waging guerrilla warfare against their opponents. They became adept at raiding towns, villages and enemy camps (often at night), seizing weapons, horses, food and captives and freeing fellow slaves, and burning the rest to cinders to delay retaliation. As the rebellion grew in strength, they also constructed fortresses, built up a navy for traversing the canals and rivers of the region, collected taxes in territories under their control, and minted their own coins.

In its initial stages, the rebellion was limited to the region around the city of Basra and the Shatt al-Arab. Early efforts by the Abbasid government to crush the revolt proved ineffectual, and several towns and villages were occupied or sacked, including al-Ubulla in 870 and Suq al-Ahwaz in 871. Basra fell in September 871 following an extended blockade, resulting in the city being burned and its inhabitants massacred. A retaliatory campaign undertaken by the caliphal regent Abu Ahmad ibn al-Mutawakkil (known by his honorific of al-Muwaffaq) against the rebels in 872 ended in failure, and the Zanj remained on the offensive over the next several years.

The continuing inability of the Abbasid army to suppress the revolt, caused in part by its preoccupation with fighting against the Saffarid Ya'qub ibn al-Layth's advance into al-Ahwaz and Iraq, eventually encouraged the Zanj to expand their activities to the north. A campaign by the rebels to occupy the marshlands between Basra and Wasit in 876 proved successful, and soon they made their way into the district of Kaskar. By 879, the rebellion reached its furthest extent. Wasit and Ramhurmuz were sacked and the rebels advanced northwest along the Tigris, coming to within fifty miles of Baghdad.

The Abbasid government regained the initiative in the war in late 879, when al-Muwaffaq sent his son Abu al-'Abbas (the future caliph al-Mu'tadid) with a major force against the rebels. Al-Muwaffaq himself joined the offensive in the following year, and over the next several months the government forces succeeded in clearing the rebels out of the districts of Iraq and al-Ahwaz and driving them back toward their "capital" of al-Mukhtarah, to the south of Basra.

Al-Mukhtarah was placed under siege in February 881, and over the next two and half years a policy by al-Muwaffaq of offering generous terms to anyone that voluntarily submitted convinced many of the rebels to abandon the struggle. The fall of al-Mukhtarah in August 883, combined with the death or capture of Ali ibn Muhammad and most of the rebel commanders, brought the revolt to an end, and the remaining rebels either surrendered to the government or were killed. Ali's head was impaled on a lance and mounted on a boat, which was then sailed up and down the region's canals for all to see that the rebel leader was dead. Three months later, on 30 November 883, Abu al-'Abbas entered Bagdhad and celebrated a victory parade in which Ali's head was displayed again.

== Consequences ==
The number of people killed in the conflict is difficult to estimate; contemporary writers give widely variable figures, and these are considered by modern historians to be gross exaggerations. Al-Masudi reported a "moderate" estimate of 500,000 casualties – though he added a clarification that this was "empty conjecture - rigorous calculation [of the number slain] is impossible" – and separately noted that 300,000 were killed at the Battle of Basra. Al-Suli gave a figure of 1,500,000 dead, which was subsequently quoted by multiple sources, while Ibn al-Taqtaqi provided a high-end number of 2,500,000. Al-Tabari's History contains no comprehensive figures, but the author frequently noted the number of soldiers killed or wounded in individual battles, with amounts ranging from hundreds to thousands.

"A large number of [people] hid among the houses and in the wells. They appeared only at night and hunted dogs, rats and cats...[t]hen they ate the corpses of their companions who had died, and they watched each other, waiting for someone to die. The stronger killed their comrades and devoured them..."

— Passage describing conditions in Basra during the war.

The rebellion greatly disrupted economic activity and caused extensive damage to the districts it took place in. Sources of the revolt describe burnt cities and towns, the seizure of food and other resources by advancing armies, the abandonment of lands and the cessation of agricultural activity, disruptions in the regional trade, and the damaging of bridges and canals in the name of military exigency. Shortages of basic necessities, such as food and water, at times became severe, and instances of cannibalism are reported to have occurred.

Both the rebels and their opponents engaged in looting, destroying supplies that were likely to fall into enemy hands, and massacring or executing captives. The long term effects of the revolt, on the other hand, are more difficult to ascertain and opinions by modern historians vary; some like Bernard Lewis believe that the rebellion resulted in no significant changes, while others such as Theodor Nöldeke argue that the regions devastated by the conflict never fully recovered afterward.

The significant arms and resources that the Abbasid government was required to throw against the Zanj meant that it was forced to divert its attention from other fronts for the duration of the conflict, resulting in the effective loss of several provinces. Ahmad ibn Tulun, the Tulunid governor of Egypt, was able to take advantage of the Abbasids' preoccupation with the Zanj and forge a de facto independent state which would survive for more than three decades, while the Saffarids Ya'qub ibn al-Layth and Amr ibn al-Layth seized several of the eastern provinces and faced no serious opposition from the central government until Ya'qub's attempt to march on Iraq itself in 876. The revolt may have also affected the government's ability to defend against the Byzantines, who scored several successes on the Anatolian frontier during this period, and possibly even indirectly contributed to the rise of the Qarmatians of Bahrain a few years later.

== Historiography ==
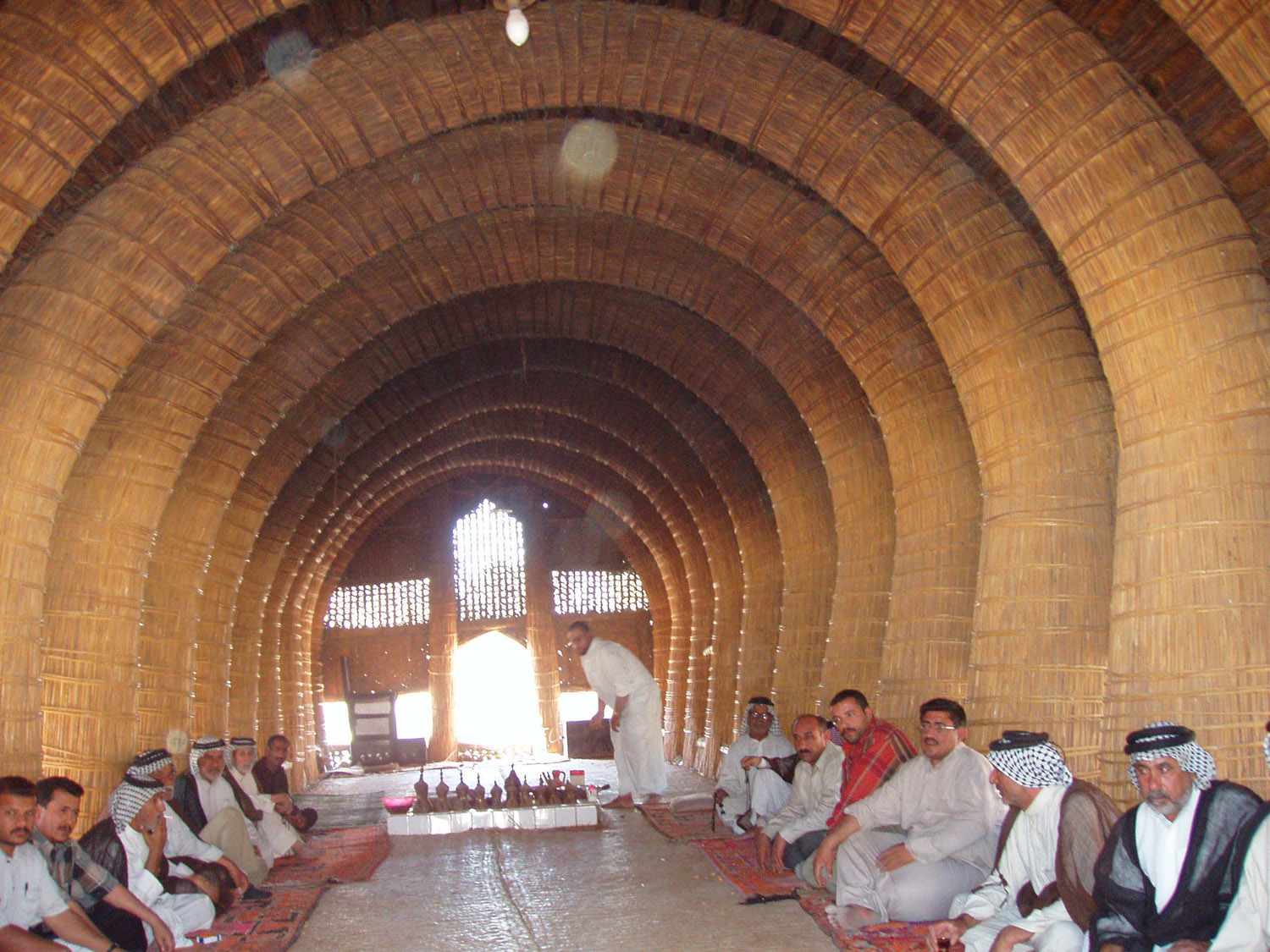
The interior of a mudhif, a traditional Marsh Arab guesthouse made entirely out of reeds.

Ghada Hashem Talhami, a scholar of the Zanj Rebellion, argues that modern views of the revolt are distorted by mistakenly equating the Zanj with East Africans. The assumption that Abbasid writers exclusively used the term "Zanj" to mean specifically the East African coast, and that therefore the people they called Zanj originated from a specific part of that region, is unsupported by contemporary sources due to their silence on the existence of an East African slave trade in this period, as well as by their occasional use of the term to mean "blacks" or "Africa" in general. Talhami cites from various historians and works to make her point that the rebellion was more of a religious/social uprising made by the lowly classed and suppressed citizens of the Basra area, which included a wide variety of people, including slaves of indeterminate origin. She points out that the sources specifically state that the people referred to as "Zanj" were not the only participants of the revolt, but were joined by Bahranis, Bedouins and others from the Basra region; moreover, they give no explicit indication that the Zanj even constituted a majority of the rebels.

Historian M. A. Shaban has argued that the rebellion was not a slave revolt, but a revolt of blacks (zanj). In his opinion, although a few runaway slaves did join the revolt, the majority of the participants were Arabs and free East Africans, and if the revolt had been led by slaves, they would have lacked the necessary resources to combat the Abbasid government for as long as they did.

=== Sources of information ===
Much of the current knowledge of the Zanj Rebellion comes from the historian al-Tabari's work History of the Prophets and Kings. It has been the subject of research by such famous Orientalists as Theodor Nöldeke (Sketches from Eastern History) and Louis Massignon (The Passion of al-Hallaj). Alexandre Popović has authored a more recent monograph on the subject.

== See also ==
- Al-Mu'tamid, Abbasid caliph (r. 870–892) during Zanj Rebellion.
- Afro-Iraqi
- Battle of Basra (871)
