= Al-Ubulla =

Ancient port city east of Basra in modern-day Iraq

Coordinates: 30°19′N 47°30′E

Al-Ubulla (Arabic: الأبلة), called Apologou (Greek: 'Απολόγου 'Εμπόριον) by the Greeks in the pre-Islamic period, was a port city at the head of the Persian Gulf east of Basra in present-day Iraq. In the medieval period, it served as Iraq's principal commercial port for trade with India.

== Location ==
The city, shown as "al-Ubullah" northeast of al-Basrah, on a map of 9th-century Iraq (lower Mesopotamia)

Al-Ubulla was situated on the right bank of the Euphrates–Tigris estuary at the opening into the Persian Gulf. It was located to the north-east of old Basra and lay on the northern side of the eponymous canal, the Nahr al-Ubulla, which connected Basra southeastwards to the Tigris river, Abadan (in modern Iran) and ultimately to the Persian Gulf. The 'Ashar neighborhood of modern Basra currently occupies the site of al-Ubulla.

== History ==
Al-Ubulla is identified with the ancient city of Apologou mentioned in the Greek manuscript Periplus of the Erythraean Sea. The city dates at least to the Sasanian era (3rd–7th centuries CE), and possibly before. According to the 10th-century chronicler Eutychius of Alexandria, it was founded by the Sasanian emperor Ardashir I (r. 212–224). Toward the end of the Sasanian period, it typically formed part of the territories of the Empire's al-Hira-based Lakhmid vassals.

During the early Muslim conquests in the 630s, al-Ubulla was conquered by the Arab forces of Utba ibn Ghazwan al-Mazini after the defeat of its 500-man Sasanian garrison. In fact the stubborn port city had to be conquered in two separate occasions by ʿUtba b. Ghazwān. In a letter attributed to Utba, he describes the city as the "port of al-Bahrayn (eastern Arabia), Uman, al-Hind (India) and al-Sin (China)". Following the foundation of the Arab garrison town of Basra further inland, al-Ubulla declined in strategic importance but remained a major trade port until the Mongol invasion.

As indicated by the medieval Arabic geographers, al-Ubulla continued to be a large town, more populous than Basra, throughout the Abbasid era (750–1258). Yaqut al-Hamawi praised the city and Ibn Hawqal describes the border lands of the Nahr al-Ubulla as a single extensive garden. Al-Ubulla supplied Basra with fresh water and was noted for its linens and shipbuilding. In 942, the governor of Uman captured the city on his way to Basra during his conflict with its strongman Abu'l-Husayn al-Baridi and his brother Abu Abdallah al-Baridi. According to the historian J. H. Kramers, the events of its occupation demonstrate its weakness as "a bulwark for that city [Basra]".

The 13th-century Mongol invasions brought about a decline of several places in this part of Iraq, including al-Ubulla. The 14th-century traveler Ibn Batuta described it as a mere village and around this time it disappeared from the historical record.

== Bibliography ==
- Bosworth, C. E., ed. (1999). The History of al-Ṭabarī, Volume V: The Sāsānids, the Byzantines, the Lakhmids, and Yemen. SUNY Series in Near Eastern Studies. Albany, New York: State University of New York Press. ISBN 978-0-7914-4355-2.
- Donner, Fred McGraw (1981). The Early Islamic Conquests. Princeton University Press.
- Gibb, H. A. R. (1962). The Travels of Ibn Battuta, A.D. 1325-1354, Volume 2. The Hakluyt Society at Cambridge University Press. ISBN 9781351539920.
- Huntingford, G.W.B. (2010). The Periplus of The Erythraean Sea, By an Unknown Author. Burlington: Ashgate Publishing Company.
- Kramers, J. H. (2000). "Ubulla". In Bearman, P. J.; Bianquis, Th.; Bosworth, C. E.; van Donzel, E. & Heinrichs, W. P. (eds.). The Encyclopaedia of Islam, Second Edition. Volume X: T–U. Leiden: E. J. Brill. pp. 765–766. ISBN 978-90-04-11211-7.
