= Yoes Rizal =

Indonesian painter

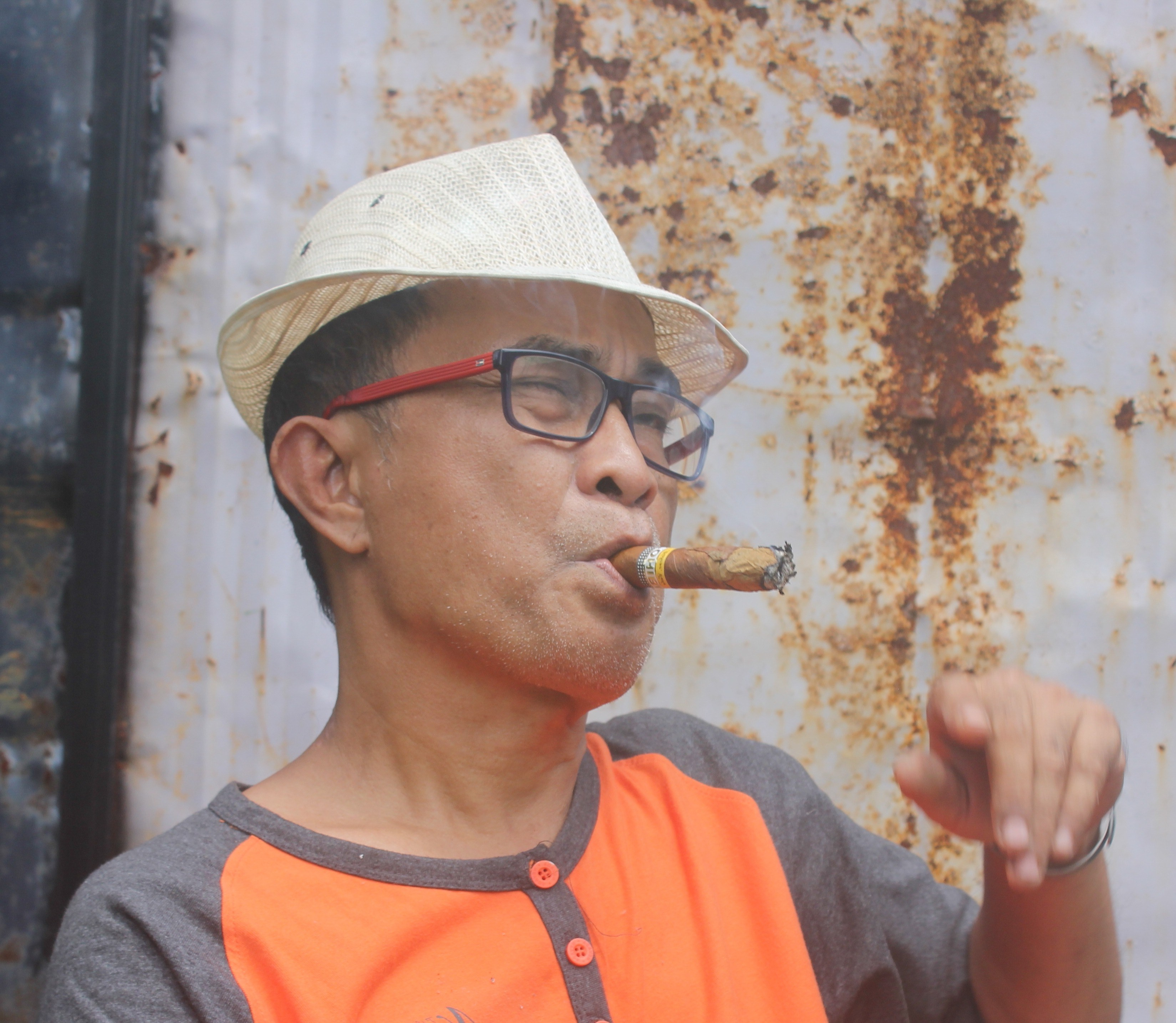

Yoes Rizal (born in Palembang) rise in Jakarta is an Indonesian contemporary artist painter.

== Biography ==
He graduated in 1985 from Art & Design at the Institut Teknologi Bandung (ITB), under Indonesian Prof. Muchtar Apin, prof. Kaboel Soeadi, Prof. Ahmad Sadali, Dr Sanento Yuliman, Umi Dachlan and Joan Sommers, American artist and master of Sumi-e (North Carolina).

Yoes Rizal is an Abstract expressionist painter.

Yoes rejects the notion that art artwork can be explained in relation to a single message or story, believing such explanations to be posturing: “My work is not final, that’s the problem. The idea is not ending at this size. It has to be continued, it’s a process,” Yoes Rizal's humanist and intuitive-reflective nature lends real depth to his treatment of the human figure and the way human interactions are depicted. We encounter here statements of universal power about the human condition.As he explained in art statement: I identify as an expressionist painter, not as a label, but as a necessity. My work is driven by an internal force that resists logic, narrative, and surface beauty. Painting for me is not about representation, it is about release. It is a direct confrontation with the unseen—the emotional, the psychological, the raw energy that exists beneath language.

For more than three decades, I have committed myself to exploring the essence of expression. This journey is not technical alone; it is physical, instinctive, and often uncomfortable. I do not seek to “see” in the traditional sense. Instead, I allow the act of painting to guide me, to break structure, to dismantle control, and to reveal something more honest than intention.

The canvas becomes a field of tension—between chaos and form, impulse and restraint. Each mark carries urgency. Each layer holds a fragment of inner truth. I reject decorative conclusions I am not interested in pleasing outcomes. What matters is the intensity of the process, the authenticity of the gesture, and the presence of energy embedded within the work.

My paintings are not stories. They are states of being.

I believe that art must remain alive—unresolved, unstable, and open. In that instability, something real can emerge: not an image, but an experience

== Bibliography ==
Zon, Fadli; Wright, Astri; Rizal, Yoes; Fadli Zon Library (Jakarta, Indonesia) (2017). Soul: Yoes Rizal. Fadli Zon Library. ISBN 9786027898172. OCLC 1016552582.

== Selected solo exhibition ==
- 2019, Serbian Writer & Artist Association and Adligat Society, Belgrade, Serbia
- 2019, Vilaka Museum, Latvia
- 2018, Pop-up/Meletup Indonesian Nasional Gallery
- 2016, Reflection, art exhibition. Rumah Kreatif Fadli Zon, Cimanggis-Depok.
- 2013, Beyond life, Galeri 2 TIM, Jakarta.
- 2011, Cemara 6 galeri, Jakarta.
- 2006, Pi Gallery, Kansas City, USA
- 2007, Side Street Gallery, North Carolina, USA
- 2005, Pauline Art Space, Jakarta, Indonesia
- 2004, Galeri Milenium, Jakarta, Indonesia
- 2002, “Emerging Bodies Part II”, Jakarta Arts Council/TIM, Jakarta, Indonesia
- 2000, Red Mills Gallery, Vermont, USA
- 2000, “Emerging Bodies”, Jakarta Arts Council/TIM, Jakarta, Indonesia
- 1997, Solo exhibition Hilton Club.
- 1997, Charity show, Aston hotel, Jakarta, Indonesia

Awards & Residency .

2019, Mark Rothko Center-Valdis Buss residency program, Vilaka-Daugavpils, Latvia. 2006-2007 Richard Snyder studio, New York, USA. 2006, Joan Sommers studio, North Carolina, USA. 2007, Jody Wilkins space, Kansas City, USA. 2000, Andrew Jen space, Los Angeles, USA. 2000, Brian St. Cyr, New York, USA. 2000, Asian artist fellows, Vermont Studio Center, sponsored by Freeman Foundation Asian artist Fellowship, USA. 2000, Boston, Massachusetts. 1999, 4th International Ipoh Art Fair Festival, Malaysia. 1999, Certificate Recognition, Philip Morris Asia Limited. 1995, Sanyu Corp, Nagoya, Japan. 1984, International Art &Fashion competition, Paris American Academy. 1984, International Graphic arts competition, TUTAV, Turkey Tourism Board.

Selected group exhibitions.

2019, Nyala, commemorated 200 years of he Java War, Price Diponegoro, Galeri Nasional, Jakarta.

2015, 2016, 2017, 2018, annually Celebrate Indonesia Independence day, House of Representative Hall, Jakarta. 2014, Rendering Regime, The Jakarta Arts Center, Jakarta. 2012, ArtEnergy, National gallery, Jakarta. 2012, Across Generations, Southeast Asian Artists show at MH gallery, New York city. 2012, Sketsa Jakarta, Bentara Budaya gallery, Jakarta. 2010 Jakarta artists group “Detergent”, the Jakarta Arts Council/TIM, Jakarta. 2010, group show, Grand Kemang, Jakarta. 2007, “Warna Indonesia”, galeri Tee Huis, Bandung. 2004, “Intimate”, Darmawangsa Town Square, Jakarta. 2001, “Interupsi, Galeri Mileninium, Jakarta. 2001, Pameran Pelukis Jakarta, Jakarta Arts Council/TIM, Jakarta. 1999, ”Phenomena of Urban Society”, Galeri Milenium, Jakarta. 1999, 4th International Ipoh arts Fair Festival, Malaysia. 1999, Indonesia Art Award & Philip Morris Asia, National Gallery, Jakarta. 1999, “German and Indonesian Expression” with Anke Malmval, galeri Milenium, Jakarta. 1999, “Duo artists”, German Center, Serpong Café Waroeng Kemang, Jakarta. 1998, Bebek Bali resto, Jakarta. 1998, Pameran Pelukis Jakarta Arts Council/TIM, Jakarta. 1994, “Untitled „94”, Hilton Club, Jakarta. 1993, “4 artists”, Enteos Club, BRI tower Jakarta. 1992, “3 Faces”, gedung YPK Bandung. 1985, International Art &Fashion Show, Paris American Academy. 1985, “Turkey in my mind”, TUTAV, Turkey. 1985, “ 4 Art Students”, Centre Culturel Francais, Bandung. 1982, “7 Art Students”, Centre Culturel Francais, Bandung
