= Umi Dachlan =

Indonesian artist (1942–2009)

- Umi Dachlan
- Born: Umajah Dachlan; 13 August 1942; Cirebon, West Jawa, Dutch East Indies
- Died: 1 January 2009 (aged 66); Bandung, Indonesia
- Education: Bandung Institute of Technology
- Known for: Painter, Lecturer
- Parents: Muchamad Dachlan (father); Rogayah (mother)

Umi Dachlan, born Umajah Dachlan, (13 August 1942 – 1 January 2009), was a pioneering Indonesian painter and an art lecturer. She graduated from the Faculty of Fine Arts and Design at the Bandung Institute of Technology ITB in 1968 as the third female graduate, where she also become the first female lecturer. Her work has been described as Abstract expressionism with a figurative Lyricism.

== Life ==
Umi Dachlan was born on 13 August 1942 in Cirebon as the ninth of ten children. Her father, Muchamad Dachlan, was a devout Muslim and businessman, who died when Umi was only seven years old. Her mother, Rogayah struggled to raise and educate her children in the difficult time during the Japanese occupation of the Dutch East Indies. Cirebon was the base for the Japanese power in West Jawa, and also a center of resistance. This made life especially hard during the end of the World War II with the Japanese occupation and the Proclamation of Indonesian Independence in 1945, and the end of the Dutch occupation of the Dutch East Indies in 1949.

The family home had a large courtyard, which was often used for traditional Cirebonese performances, such as traditional Topeng mask dances, Barong Kepet magic shows, and Martial Arts practices, which fascinated Umi in particular. These performances exposed her to various arts right from her childhood, where she showed her talent for painting, especially her love of drawing.

While her mother wanted her to pursue a legal career, Umi Dachlan followed her love of the arts. The two major Indonesian art schools were the Indonesian Institute of the Arts, Yogyakarta (formerly named ASRI) and the Design Faculty of the ITB in Bandung (FSRD), where she enrolled in 1962.

The personality of Umi Dachlan is described as nurturing, firm and genuine by her friends and colleagues. Since 1997, she lived in her dream home at the Tamansari Road just in front of the Design Institute in Bandung, where she received her close friends and family. The fellow artist and interior designer Professor Imam Buchori Zainuddin, who also worked at the ITB, designed her house environmentally friendly, creating light and open spaces while using natural materials. The house was finished in 1997 with furnitures designed by Farouk Kamal, a post-modern Indonesian furniture designer and a classmate of Buchori at the ITB. Her house symbolized her two greatest pleasures, nature and music, especially Jazz, which were crucial to her artistic work.

Umi Dachlan was not married, and she died at the age of 66 on 1 January 2009 in her house in Bandung. Her body was buried in the Jabangbayi Public Cemetery in Kesambi, Cirebon.

== Works ==
Umi's artistic career began with a study of the principles and techniques of artists and art lecturers at ITB, Ahmad Sadali. She was also mentored by A.D. Pirous, Mochtar Apin, Popo Iskandar, Srihadi and Yusuf Affendi. She was respected and well-liked by many colleagues such as Heyi Ma'mun, Sam Bimbo, Seriawan Sabana and Sunaryo.

Umi Dachlan completed her studies at the Bandung Institute of Technology ITB in 1968. During college, she often worked as a co-designer/designer in a group in the field of fine arts. After graduating, she painted several mural-drawing commissions for various institutions, such as the Pertamina Dumai Office, the Archive of the Indonesian Armed Forces in Bandung, and at the Indonesian Parliament building MPR/DPR in Jakarta, where she supported the installation of her teacher Ahmad Sadali together with several other students.

Within one year after graduating from college, she was appointed a lecturer at the Faculty of Fine Arts, ITB. In the same year, she also received the Hadiah Memorial Wendy Sorensen award for Best Painting. Wendy Sorensen was the wife of an important architect in Indonesian history, Abel Sorensen, who was appointed by President Sukarno to design the Hotel Indonesia for the 4th Asian Games in 1960.

Umi Dachlan was among the 2nd generation Indonesian women artists, which sprung up during the 1960s. Together with Erna Pirous, the wife of A.D. Pirous, Kartika Affandi, the daughter of Indonesia's premier Artist Affandi, Rita Widagdo and Nunung WS, the group influenced modern Indonesian art. The book Image and Abstraction that accompanied the first mayor exhibition of Umi Dachlan in 2000, showed a photo about the group of all 5 women painter during their trip to the Mills College Museum in Auckland, California in the 1990s. (Mamannoor, p. 32)

=== Early works (1962–1976) ===
Umi Dachlan's early work was influenced by traditional Batik paintings and tapestry works and landscape paintings. Helena Spanjaard describes her early work as abstract, lyrical compositions that are inspired by landscapes and a strong relation to her activities in textile design and collages. While Umi Dachlan was strongly influenced by her faculty at ITB, Bandung, she also had many artistic contacts with the second major arts center in Indonesia, the Akademi Seni Rupa Indonesia (ASRI) at the Indonesian Institute of the Arts, Yogyakarta. Since establishment of the Republic of Indonesia after World War II, these two institutions reflected two poles of a discussions called "East versus West".

She studied and traveled frequently abroad to advance her skills and experiences. In 1969 one of her first exhibitions abroad brought her, and several fellow painters, to New York as part of the delegation of the First Lady Siti Hartinah, the wife of President Suharto, for the celebration of the 25th anniversary of the United Nations. During this trip, she was exposed to American art forms, including the Abstract expressionism, a post-World-War II art form that was well established by then. Major artists such as Jackson Pollock, Mark Rothko, Willem de Kooning, Franz Kline, Frank Stella or Robert Motherwell were at their prime, well known internationally. In 1970, Umi joined her teacher Ahmad Sadali as a staff member of the design team for the Indonesian Pavilion at the Expo '70 in Osaka, Japan.

Her alma mater, the ITB, was almost so often criticized as too Westernized as it was led by the Dutch painter Ries Mulder since the end of World War II and the proclamation of the Indonesian Republic. Therefore, the institution, whereas the ASRI in Yogyakarta was viewed as a reflection of indigenous, true Indonesia art. In 1954, an exhibition of 11 students of Ries Mulder at the ITB had started the debate, when the painter and art critic Trisno Sumardjo labeled their works as "bloodless, formal, self-centered and out of reality with the situation in the country". Yet, Trisno overlooked in his criticism that especially the abstract-expressionist paintings of A.D. Pirous, Ahmad Sadali and later Umi Dachlan used many and strong Indonesian elements, such as historic geometrical forms, Balinese-Chinese coins and religious symbols.
In 1971, Umi joined a group of 18 artists at the ITB that called itself Group 18. They released a serigraph of screenprints to popularise their works and styles, which were shown at the Taman Izmail Marzuki Exhibition Hall in Jakarta. It is unknown if the choice of 18 artists was deliberate to reflect on The Irascible 18, a group of 18 Abstract, Modernist artists in the 1950s in New York who rejected their representation by the art establishment at that time. However, today many of the members of The rascible 18 belong to the most expensive artists worldwide, and similarly, the Group 18 artists today belong to the most influential Indonesian artists since the World War II. Their paintings, statues and teachings are a quintessential cornerstone of modern Indonesian art.

In 1974, the "East versus West" conflict and the focus on classical art forms such as paintings and sculptures led to the foundation of the Indonesian New Art Movement, Gerakan Seni Rupa Baru which is seen as the start of Indonesian contemporary art. Many of the individual artists of the ITB did not see their work as a reflection if East versus West, including A.D. Pirous and Umi Dachlan who was close with many of the ASRI Artists, such as Fadjar Sidik, Handrio and Nasirun, the later owns several of her late works. Umi Dachlan also exhibited numerous times in Galleries and Museums in Yogyakarta since 1968, including at the Affandi Museum.

In these early years, it was mainly the guidance of the teachers Umi Dachlan as well as her artistic upbringing that formed her style. Especially in her landscape paintings, she uses a color palette and the space very similar to another leading Muslim woman artist, the Lebanese writer and abstract painter Etel Adnan. Like Umi Dachlan, Etel Adnan created paintings and tapestries showing landscapes, that receive a growing worldwide recognition since the early 21st Century.

=== Mid-career works (1977–1987) ===
Her later travel and studies took her to Asia and Europe, including The Netherlands, France and Spain, where she absorbed European art and culture. From 1977 to 1979, Umi studied in Amsterdam at the Gerrit Rietveld Academie. During this stay, she also enrolled as a student at the Design Academy Eindhoven.

In addition to her studies abroad, her mid-career work was strongly influenced by her senior fellow teachers Ahmad Sadali and A.D. Pirous. Umi is thus the heir to the abstraction tradition of "Sekolah Bandung" pioneered by A.D. Pirous and Achmad Sadali. This is clearly seen in his works which emerged as an attempt to achieve Sadali's aesthetic perfection. Umi and Sadali's closeness, both in terms of approach and aesthetic image, is undeniable, and his trademark is reminiscent of Sadali. In her paintings, like Sadali's, Umi uses spontaneous color application with several layers of paint.

The Australian Art Historian, Prof. Astri Wright describes the style of Umi Dachlan's in 1998 as "The purest abstract painter among the present generation of Indonesian women artists":

Umi Dachlan's monumentally balanced compositions and her use of gold bear witness to her expertise. She is clearly indebted to Sadali she has now adapted as her own. Umi's range and pallet, however, distinguish her work from her tutor's in numerous ways. A strong relationship between her art and textile design is visible in her lyrical compositions, mostly inspired by landscapes.

While Umi rejected the strict religious traditions of her family in her early years, they played an important spiritual and religious role in her mid- and late-career works and life. The relationship between her Muslim religion and her Art are described in the book of her friends, E. and M. Bollansee:

"Umi Dachlan's work is influenced by religion. Harmony and submission to Allah are prevalent as her work really is a tribute to the Great Creator."

Her works during this period reflect tenets of Islamic philosophy and are expressed through her spiritual relationship with nature and music. Especially during this period, her work has been compared with European painters such as Antoni Tàpies, Jean Fautrier and Pablo Picasso, and most notably with Mark Rothko, because she used a similar metaphysical and spiritual approach in her paintings as Rothko used for his deeply spiritual works. Similar to the Australian painter Kudditji Kngwarreye, who is also compared to Rothko by foreign visitors Umi was probably unaware of this comparison, seeking her own, independent abstract imaginations.

=== Late works (1988–2009) ===
After the death of her mentor Ahmad Sadali in 1987, she developed into her own style. In 1992, she went on the Hajj in Mekka, where she experienced the desert. After these experiences, she added warmer and more earthy colors to her artistic palette, such as ochre. An abstract theme in her late work were "pillars", a theme that had also been used repeatedly by her mentors such as A.D. Pirous and Sadali. Her painting Five Pillars seems to reflect the Five Pillars of Islam. Her warmer, earthy color palette is reminiscent of the great Spanish Abstract Expressionist Antoni Tàpies. Another visible artistic change was the larger number of figurative paintings, such as her Matador series, relating to the corridas, which had fascinated her. In 2000, the art critic and artist, Mamannoor wrote a book that accompanied a large Solo exhibition by Umi Dachlan in the Andi Galeri in Jakarta. Four different of her matador works, and in total 75 of her works are shown in the Mamannoor publication.

Her colleague A.D. Pirous described the style of Umi Dachlan's paintings as a tendency to express an abstract-contemplative visual language in a painting:

"She can be very engrossed and carried into the fields of color, into shapes and lines that can take us to a visible world that is familiar with a sense of contemplation, a sense of solemnity, whether cheerful, sad or contemplative. She likes to reveal shapes, which want to drag us into other experiences that are hidden beneath the surface."

Between 1993 and 2007, Umi painted at least 15 Matador works, which are among her most desired paintings. The theme depicts the fight between a bull and a matador, which she experienced during her visits in Spain. She used the theme to depict Dis-Harmony in the world, e.g. showing the uneven power in civilization.

The majority of the work if Umi Dachlan are oil and acrylic paintings, of which almost 200 have been published in books and catalogues. The vast majority of these paintings are abstract, with about 30 known figurative paintings, which include her Matador series as well as several portraits and landscapes. In addition, in her early works she painted several murals and few collages and textile works, 4 of which are known as of 2021. Although Umi Dachlan used sketches to depict her paintings, very few are known today.

Since more than 20 years, the works of Umi Dachlan have been auctioned by major international auction houses, including Bonhams, Christie's and Sotheby's, and they have a common presence in Indonesian, Singaporean and Hong Kong Auctions Houses.

== Awards ==
▷ Best Painting: Wendy Sorensen Memoria Award, New York, USA (1968)
▷ Member of the Design Center of the Indonesian pavilion at Expo '70, Osaka, Japan (1970)
▷ Pertamina Award, Jakarta (1973)
▷ Best Women Painter: Women's Organization Coordination Agency – BKOW (1981)
▷ Penghargaan dari alma mater ITB Bandung (1982)
▷ Award Radio Hilversum, The Netherlands (1986)
▷ Ford Foundation Award (1991)
▷ Satyalancana Karya Satya from the Indonesian President Susilo Bambang Yudyonono for 30 years of service (2007)

== Exhibitions ==
Over more than 40 years, the works of Umi Dachlan have been shown in numerous solo and group exhibitions. Among her first exhibitions was the participation in the first Grand Exhibition of Indonesian Painting (Pameran Besar Seni Lukis Indonesia) at Jakarta Arts Center, Taman Ismail Marzuki – TIM in 1968. This exhibition was the inaugural Jakarta Biennale, which continues until today. In the 1990s, Umi was among the premier Asian artists as well as a leading Islamic women artist that was featured worldwide. A worldwide exhibition of the Jordanian National Gallery with the title "Breaking the Veils" has been shown in numerous countries since 2002.

Numerous National Galleries worldwide own or displayed her works, including in Australia, Indonesia, Jordan, Singapore and The Netherlands.

Exhibitions (Selection)
Year	Solo Exhibitions	Group Exhibitions
1967		Studio 13, Gedung Merdeka, Bandung, Indonesia
1968	ITB Bandung, Bandung, Indonesia	Young Indonesian Painters Exhibitions. LIA, Jakarta, and Yogyakarta, Indonesia
1969		Melacanang Gallery, Manila, Philippines, and Exhibition in Palembang, Sumatra
1970		United Nations Headquarters, New York, United States, and Biennale I at TIM, Jakarta
1971		Group 18 at TIM, Jakarta
1972		Grand Exhibition of Indonesian Painting 1972, TIM, Jakarta
1973	Chase Manhattan Bank, Jakarta, Indonesia	
1974		Young Artists Asian Festival Of Contemporary Art, Malaysia and Singapore
1976		Biennale II at TIM, Jakarta
1977	TIM, Jakarta, Indonesia	
1978	Tapestry and Wall Hanging, Museum Rijswijk, The Hague, The Netherlands and Solo Exhibition, Galerie Jos, Eindhoven, The Netherlands	
1979		Contemporary Art Exhibition, Ueno Park Museum, Tokyo, Japan
1980	Decenta Gallery, Bandung, Indonesia and Taman Ismail Marzuki, Jakarta	
1981	KOLOGDAM, Bandung, Indonesia	Art Exhibition, Los Angeles, United States
1982		Indonesian Women Painter at LIA, Jakarta, Indonesia
1983		Artists at Purna Busaya Museum, Yogyakarta, Indonesia
1984		International Women's Artist Exhibition, Vienna, Austria and Geneva, Switzerland
1985	The Japan Foundation, Jakarta, Indonesia	
1986		Exhibition of Artists from Bandung, Ministry of Culture and Education. 21–28 December, West Jawa, Indonesia
1989		11 Female Artists in Bandung. 27. May – 11 June, Savoy Homann, Bandung, Indonesia
1990	TIM, Jakarta, and Gallery Bandung, Bandung, Indonesia	5th Asian Art Festival, Kuala Lumpur, Malaysia, and Kias Travelling Exhibition, United States, and Exhibition at Gallery Nyoman Gunarsa, Yogyakarta, Indonesia
1991	Centre Culturel Francais (CCF), Jakarta, Indonesia	A.D. Pirous – Sunaryo – Umi Dachlan: Padma Resort, Legian, Bali, Indonesia
1992		7th Asian International Art Exhibition, Merdeka Building, Bandung, Indonesia, and Flyways Project, Monterey, California, United States
1993		8th Asian International Art Festival, Fukuoka, Japan, and Lintas-Seni Indonesia-Denmark, World Trade Center, Jakarta, Indonesia
1994	Program of International Islamic Women Conference, Cape Town, South Africa	9th Asian International Art Exhibition, Taipei, Taiwan, and Faculty Art Exhibition Kyungsung University-ITB, Pusan, South Korea
1995		10th Asian International Art Exhibition, Singapore, From Script to Abstraction, Jordan National Gallery of Fine Arts, Amman, Jordan, and Istiqlal Contemporary Art Festival, Jakarta, Indonesia
1996		11th Asian Art Exhibition, Manila, and Philippines, Gothaer Kunstforum Exhibition, Cologne, Germany
1997		13 Contemporary Artists from Indonesia, 9 August – 7 September, Sophienholm, Kongens Lyngby, Denmark. Dialog Rupa Seniman Indonesia 12 : Pameran Seni Rupa Kontemporer. 1.-4-April, Bandung, Indonesia
1999		12th Asian International Art Festival, Fukuoka, Japan, and Group Exhibition, Rudana Museum, Bali, Indonesia
2000	Imagi dan Abstraksi, Niaga Tower, Jakarta, Indonesia	
2002		Breaking the Veils: Women Artists of the Islamic World, Rhodes – Greece, France, Italy, Spain and United States. 2002–2012
2006		Jakarta Biennale XII, 2006
2007		22nd Asian International Art Exhibition (22nd AIAE), Bandung, Indonesia
2008		Pameran Besar Seni Rupa (PBSR) "Manifesto". Jakarta, Indonesia
2009	Mythomorphic, Selasar Sunaryo Art Space, Jakarta, Indonesia	
2010	Mythomorphic, Affandi Art Museum Gallery III, Yogyakarta, Indonesia	
2017		Intuition/Abstraction, Art Stage Jakarta, Indonesia
2018		Back To Bandung. National Gallery of Indonesia
2019		Y:Collect³ Biennale, Bandung, Indonesia, and Poros Bandung at Galeri Salihara, 2–31. March 2019, Jakarta
2020	Metaphors For Humanity, Art Agenda, S.E.A., Jakarta, Indonesia, Singapore and Taiwan	
2021		From Dusk to Dawn, Dual Exhibition with Fernando Zobel. Art Agenda, S.E.A., Manila, Philippines

== Literature ==
=== Monographs ===
- "Umi Dachlan: Image and Abstraction". Monograph by Mamannoor, Andi Galeri, Jakarta, 2000. Indonesian and English, 172 pages, 101 plates with 75 works and 26 photos of Umi Dachlan
- "Umi Dachlan: Mythomorphic". Monograph by Selasar Sunaryo Art Space, 2009. Indonesian, 55 pages
- "Umi Dachlan: Metaphors For Humanity". Monograph by Vivian Yeo Jin Wen, Editorial Art Agenda, S.E.A., Singapore, 2021. English, Indonesian and Chinese, 248 pages, 170 plates with works and photos of Umi Dachlan. ISBN 978-9811494468

=== General art literature ===
- "Bandung: The Laboratory of the West?". Helena Spanjaard in: Modern Indonesian Art, 1945–1990, Page 54–77. Published by Fischer, Berkeley, CA, USA, 1990. Includes 2 paintings of Umi Dachlan. ISBN 978-0295971414
- "Masterpieces of Contemporary Indonesian Painters". Esmeralda and Marc Bollansee. Published by Times Editions, Singapore, 1997. Includes 5 paintings and the CV of Umi Dachlan. ISBN 978-9812047892
- "Indonesian Heritage: Visual Art". Hilda Soemantri, published by Editions Didier Miller, Singapore, 1998. Includes 1 painting and a description of Umi Dachlan's style. ISBN 978-9813018310
- "Indonesian Women Artists – The Curtain Opens" Carla Bianpoen, Farah Wardani, Wulan Dirgantoro, Heather Waugh. Published by Yayasan Senirupa, Jakarta, Indonesia, 2007. Includes 5 paintings and the CV of Umi Dachlan. ISBN 978-9791656207
- "Modern Indonesian Art: From Raden Saleh to the Present Day." Koes Karnadi et al., Published by Koes Artbooks, Denpasar, Bali. 2nd rev. Ed. 2010. Includes 1 painting and a brief description about Umi Dachlan. ISBN 978-9798704024
- "Artists and their Inspiration. A Guide Through Indonesian Art History (1930–2015)." Helena Spanjaard. LM Publishers, Volendam, The Netherlands, 2016. Includes 1 painting and 1 photo of Umi Dachlan. ISBN 978-9460223877
