= Popo Iskandar =

Indonesian painter

Popo Iskandar (17 December 1927 – 29 January 2000) was a painter, a prominent Indonesian art educator, literature critic and an essayist.

== Life ==
Popo Iskandar was born in Garut, West Java. His father, R.H. Natamihardja is a retired bank clerk. Since childhood his father expected Popo to become an architect. Although he failed in architecture, he managed to get a baccalaureate degree in mathematics. Popo began his painting education during the Japanese rule in Indonesia. After that, he entered the Bandung Institute of Technology (ITB) in 1953. He had taught at IKIP Bandung. Angkama, his older brother who works as a HIS drawing teacher, greatly influenced Popo's interest in painting. Popo had received guidance from two teachers, namely Hendra Gunawan and Barli Samitawinata.

Popo's paintings were heavily influenced by his teacher at the Department of Fine Arts, ITB, Ries Mulder from the Netherlands, who painted in the Cubism and Abstract schools of thought. At the Faculty of Fine Arts and Design (FSRD-ITB), he worked alongside artists such as A.D. Pirous, Ahmad Sadali, Mochtar Apin and Umi Dachlan. However, the influence of Hendra Gunawan's realism was strong enough that in his development, Popo found his own style in painting.

He is a painter with strong characteristic in his expressive painting style, especially in his figurative expression, where he became a role model for the next generation of painters. Popo liked to paint cats, earning the nickname "cat painter". His famous motives are "Cat" and "Rooster". However, he also paints numerous other themes from the nature.

Popo frequently participated in painting exhibitions, both domestically and abroad. In 1976, he held a solo exhibition in The Hague, Netherlands. In 1980, he was awarded the Anugerah Seni Negara by the Indonesian Government for his artistic achievements.

Apart from being a painter and educator in art education, Popo Iskandar is also known as an art thinker and critic. He likes to write essays about art and culture in various mass media. He was elected chairman of BPB Kiwari Bandung in 1960 and a life member of the Jakarta Academy in 1970.

== Bibliography ==
- Affandi: A New Path in Realism (Jakarta, 1977)
- History of Indonesian Fine Arts (Jakarta, 1982) published by the Directorate of Culture, Ministry of Education and Culture.
- Naskah Pre-Persagi Indonesian Painting
- 55 Years of Paintings by Popo Iskandar: Image and Thought. Mamannoor, Published by Yayasan Matra Media Bandung, 1998, 188 Pages.
