= Abdul Djalil Pirous =

Indonesian artist (1932–2024)

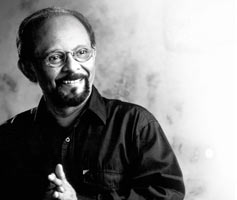
- Born: 11 March 1932; Meulaboh, Aceh, Dutch East Indies
- Died: 16 April 2024 (aged 92); Bandung, West Java, Indonesia
- Education: Seni Rupa ITB (1964); Rochester Institute of Technology, NY, US (1969)
- Occupations: Painter, lecturer
- Known for: Abstract Art, Arabic Calligraphy
- Spouse: Erna Garnasih Pirous
- Children: 3

Abdul Djalil Pirous (11 March 1932 – 16 April 2024), known as A.D. Pirous, was an Indonesian fine arts artist and lecturer. He was a pioneer in graphic design education at the Fine Arts Institute of Technology in Bandung, and the founder of an art and design studio called Decenta (1973–1983). A.D. Pirous was married to Erna Garnasih Pirous, and the couple had three children.

Pirous was one of the leading modern Abstract artists in Indonesia. Together with Ahmad Sadali and Umi Dachlan, he was an integral part of The Bandung School from the 1960s onwards. He pioneered the use of Arabic religious calligraphy and Acehnese ethnic ornaments in modern Indonesian art, and was particularly noted for the spiritual nature of his work.

== Biography ==
Abdul Djalil Pirous was born in Meulaboh, Aceh. His birth name was Abdul Djalil Syaifuddin, a name given to him by a religious teacher who boarded with the family. His father was Mauna 'Pirous' Noor Mohamad, of Gujerati descent and his mother was Hamidah, from Meulaboh. Pirous' early life experience was during the late Dutch colonial period and the Japanese occupation of Indonesia. At the end of World War II he went to Medan for his education.

In 1964, he completed his education at the Department of Fine Arts, Bandung Institute of Technology (ITB), where he was a student of Ries Mulder, the influential Dutch painter and lecturer. Thereafter, he continued his studies in printmaking and graphic design at the Rochester Institute of Technology, Rochester New York, United States (1969).

Between 1964 and 2002, he worked at the FDSR-ITB, the Fine Arts and Design Faculty of the ITB-Bandung. He served as the first Dean of the Faculty of Art and Design ITB (1984-1990), and was inaugurated as a professor at ITB in 1994.

A.D. Pirous was married to Erna Garmasih Pirous, an accomplished painter. Erna studied at the ITB as well as in France, and she belongs to the second generation of Indonesian modern women artists. A.D. and Erna Pirous have three children, Mida Meutia, Iwan Meulia, and Raihan Muerila.

The couple lived in Bandung after their marriage. In 1994 Pirous founded the gallery Serambi Pirous. They built a new larger home in Bandung 2003, and moved the "Serambi Pirous" to there in 2017. Pirous died at Borromeus Hospital in Bandung on 16 April 2024, at the age of 92.

== Work ==
Pirous began to work as an artist when he was still in Medan, making cartoons, movie posters and portraits to help pay for his education. In 1953 he saw an exhibition in Medan of Indonesia's leading modern artists, and this inspired him to take up art as a career. In 1955 he moved to Bandung to study art at ITB. In Bandung, Pirous joined the artists' collective Sanggar Seniman, and had his first work exhibited with this group in 1960. By the 1970s, he was exhibiting regularly nationally and internationally. He had five solo exhibitions, including: Retrospective Exhibition I for works 1960–1985, at the Taman Ismail Marzuki, Jakarta in 1985 and Retrospective II for works from 1985 to 2002, at the Indonesian National Gallery, Jakarta in 2002.

His painting style is easily recognizable as the textures and colours are very elaborate and detailed. This style was achieved by mixing the colours with alabaster paste and manipulating them with a palette knife.

Since the early 21st Century, a growing international interest in Indonesian modern and abstract art has brought painters such as A.D. Pirous, Ahmad Sadali, Fadjar Sidik, Popo Iskandar and Umi Dachlan to the international art market.

=== Islamic calligraphy ===
Of the various topics that Pirous discusses in his work other than natural objects, landscapes, daily life, animal figures, abstracts and others, calligraphy works that take up Pirous's time, energy and thoughts. For the first time since the start of Pirous's etching work featuring Arabic calligraphy, Surah Al-Ikhlas: Pure Faith (1970), the term 'calligraphy' 'Islam' in Indonesia (two terms that stand alone and accompany 'art' and 'modern' painting) was attached to Pirous.

Pirous started his Islamic calligraphy work when he saw the exhibition of ceramic fragments, ancient Islamic manuscripts, Al-Qur'an Calligraphy and miniature paintings at the Metropolitan Museum of Art, New York, United States in 1970. Seeing these objects reminded Pirous of his hometown in Aceh. This was a revelation that his own traditions could serve as the basis of his art, alongside the art of the West that he had studied under Mulder. Working with Ahmad Sadali and Umi Dachlan, Pirous emphasised a strong Indonesian and religious component in the Abstract Art that was taught at ITB. During the 1950s, the Art Faculty at ITB had been criticised as a "laboratory of the West", but this new development demonstrated that the East/West dichotomy was not really relevant to their art.

=== Architecture ===
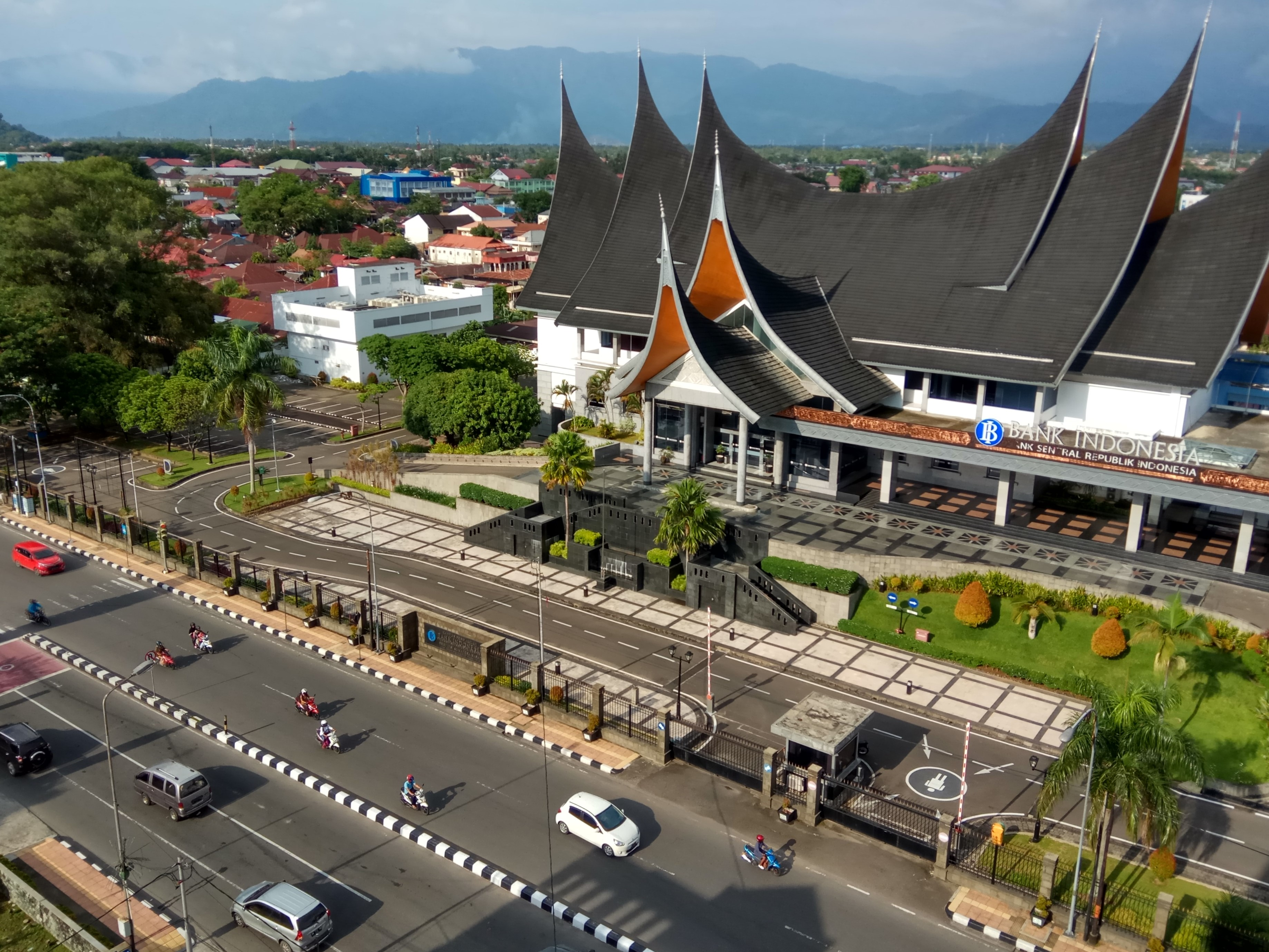
Bank Indonesia building in Padang. Abdul Djalil Pirous was involved in working on the decorations and ornaments.

Pirous designed the ornamentation for the building of the Bank Indonesia in Padang, among other architectural projects.

=== Decenta Design Studio ===
In 1973, A.D. Pirous founded the Decenta Design Studio, an abbreviation from Design Center Association together with Adriaan Palar, T. Sutanto and G. Sidharta. The members of the design bureau were known to use silkscreen as a medium for the expansion of Indonesian graphic arts. This group was an extension of their first joint work from 1971, a folio of 18 screenprint from leading artists at the ITB published under the title Grup 18. They were quite intensive in experimenting with screen printing or screen printing techniques, yet studio Decenta closed in 1983.

Pirous was one of Indonesia's leading painters, and his paintings are displayed in the collection of the National Gallery of Indonesia, Jakarta, including the painting "The Roof of Heaven and Earth is Expansive" from 1990.

== Exhibitions ==
A.D. Pirous' works have been exhibited in hundreds of national and international exhibitions.

Solo Exhibitions:

- Retrospective I for works 1960–1985, in the Taman Izmail Marzuki, Jakarta (1985)
- Retrospective II for works 1985–2002, at Galeri Nasional, Jakarta (2002)
- Ja'u Timu at Selasar Sunaryo Art Space, Bandung (2012)
- Verses of the Universe in Kuala Lumpur, Malaysia (2015)
- A.D Pirous: Spiritual Calligraphy. World Trade Center, Jakarta (2016)
- Suaka - Modernist Series #1, Art Agenda S.E.A, Jakarta (2022)

Group Exhibitions:

- Investigating the Collection: National Collection of Fine Arts Exhibition, National Gallery Indonesia, Jakarta, 10–28 October 2018.

== Awards ==
Pirous received numerous awards for his achievements as an artist and humanist:

● Best Print at the Art Show Naples, New York, United States of America (1970)
● Best Painting at the Exhibition Biennale I Arts Council Jakarta (1974)
● Best Painting at the Exhibition Biennale II Arts Council Jakarta (1976)
● Bronze Medal of the Foreign Ministry, Republic Korea (1984)
● Art Award by the Minister of Education and Culture (1985)
● Satyalancana Medal for cultural achievements by the President of the Republic of Indonesia (2002)
● Habibie Award for Cultural Studies (2015)

Pirous was appointed several times as head of the delegation, member of the jury, and curator of international art exhibitions, representing Indonesia.

== Bibliography ==
=== Monographs ===
- A.D. Pirous: Vision, faith, and a journey in Indonesian art, 1955–2002. by K.M. George & Mamannoor. (Yayasan Serambi Pirous, 2002 - 255 pages) ISBN 978-9799677402
- A.D. Pirous: Melukis itu Menulis (Painting is Writing). by Dudy Wiyancoko, Editor. (ITB, Bandung, 2003 - 252 pages, numerous photos) ISBN 9799299489
- Melukis Islam: Amal dan Etika Seni Islam di Indonesia. by Kenneth M. George, Hawe Setiawan (Translator), Dudy Wiyancoko (Editor) and A.D. Pirous (Yayasan Serambi Pirous, 2009 - 250 pages) ISBN 978-9794336984
- Picturing Islam: Art and Ethics in a Muslim Lifeworld. by Kenneth M. George (Wiley-Blackwell, 2010) ISBN 9781405129589
- Notes of a collector : A.D. Pirous' spiritual message. by Wahyuni Bahar. (PT Telaga Ilmu Indonesia, 2012 - 87 pages) ISBN 978-9791980081

=== General Art Literature ===
- "Bandung: The Laboratory of the West?". Helena Spanjaard in: Modern Indonesian Art, 1945-1990. Published by Fischer, Berkeley, CA, USA, 1990, page 54–77. ISBN 978-0295971414
- "Ketiga Kata Ketika Warna. In Words In Colours". Puisi dan Luisan - Poetry and Colours. Published by Yayasan Ananda; Ed. 1 edition, English and Indonesian, 1995. Includes 1 paintings of A.D. Pirous. ISBN 978-9798424038
- "Indonesian Heritage: Visual Art". editor Hildawati Soemantri, published by Editions Didier Miller, Singapore, 1998. Includes 1 painting of A.D. Pirous. ISBN 978-9813018310
- "Modern Indonesian Art: From Raden Saleh to the Present Day." Koes Karnadi et al., Published by Koes Artbooks, Denpasar, Bali. 2nd rev. Ed. 2010. ISBN 978-9798704024
- "Artists and their Inspiration. A Guide Through Indonesian Art History (1930-2015)." Helena Spanjaard. LM Publishers, Volendam, The Netherlands, 2016. Includes 2 paintings of A.D. Pirous, pages 89–90. ISBN 978-9460223877

=== Videography and Internet ===
- Interview AD Pirous - Pasar Seni ITB pertama 1972 by Pasar Seni Indonesia, 28 October 2013 (in Bahasa Indonesia). Youtube: Interview AD Pirous by Pasar Seni Indonesia
- A.D. Pirous: "Melukis Itu Proses Mencatat" by Mizan, 22 May 2014 (in Bahasa Indonesia). Youtube: "Painting is a Writing Process" by Mizan
- Opening of the Serambi Pirous Gallery - 86 Years of A.D. Pirous, 12 May 2018 (in Bahasa Indonesia). Youtube: Serambi Pirous Gallery - 86 Years of A.D. Pirous
- Art Exhibition Modernist Series #1: "Suaka". A. D. Pirous, Art Agenda Jakarta, 10 Juli 2022 (in Bahasa Indonesia). Youtube: Suaka - Modernist Series #1, A.D. Pirous
- AD Pirous: Discovering Indonesia in New York (in Indonesian Language). Bentara Budaya, 18. April 2023. Youtube Podcast: AD Pirous Menemukan Indonesia di New York
- AD Pirous: Spreading the Calligraphy Virus (in Indonesian Language). Bentara Budaya, 19. April 2023. Youtube Podcast: AD Pirous Menebar Virus Kaligrafi
- AD Pirous: Islamic Art is Beautiful (in Indonesian Language). Bentara Budaya, 20. April 2023. Youtube Podcast: AD Pirous: Seni Islam itu Indah
