= Sartono (given name) =

Sartono is a given name. Notable people with the name include:

- Sartono (1900–1968), Indonesian politician and lawyer
- Sartono Anwar (born 1947), Indonesian footballer and manager
- Sartono Kartodirdjo (1921–2007), Indonesian historian
