= Johan Bernard Abraham Fortunatus Mayor Polak =

Indonesian politician (1905–1982)

Johan Mayor Polak
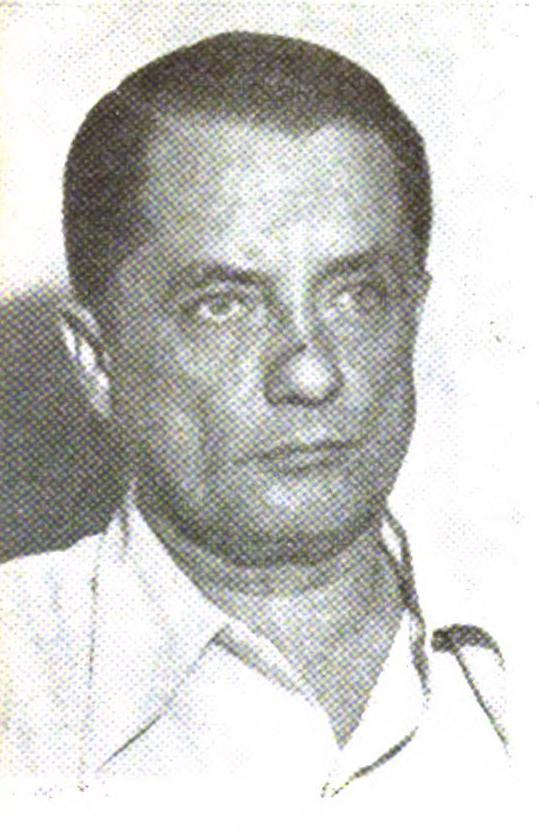

Personal details
- Born: 4 November 1905 Malang, Dutch East Indies
- Died: 30 November 1982 (aged 77) Denpasar, Bali, Indonesia
- Party: Socialist Party of Indonesia
- Other political affiliations: SDWP
- Education: Leiden University

Johan Bernard Abraham Fortunatus Mayor Polak, usually abbreviated as J.B.A.F. Mayor Polak or J.B.A.F. Polak (born 4 November 1905 - 30 November 1982) was a former member of the House of Representatives of Jewish descent and a member of the Masonic Order. During the colonial period, Johan worked as a civil servant (ambtenaar) until the Japanese occupation. During that time, he was an aspirant controller in Malang, also in Bondowoso, and then in Tuban.

== Early life ==
Johan was born in Malang on 4 November 1905. His father was Salomon Machiel Polak, a Dutch Jew born in Surabaya. Based on his surname, his father was a descendant of Ashkenazi Jewish immigrants who most likely came from Poland. They have lived in the Netherlands since the 18th century. One of Johan's ancestors, Wolf Michiel Polak, was born in Amsterdam around 1730. From his father's side, the first to settle in the Dutch East Indies was his great-grandfather, also named Salomon Machiel Polak.

His mother's name was Louise Jacqueline de Rochemont, who was of Huguenot descent. His ancestor, François de Maystre, came from Sommières, a commune in southern France. From his mother's side, the first to be born and settle in the Indies was his father, Pieter Rutgardus de Rochemont. The name "Abraham Fortunatus" probably comes from the name of his mother's great-grandfather who was born in Lisbon.

Johan was appointed as a candidate for colonial civil service in 1922 In 1927, he studied Indologie at Leiden University with a specialization in economics as a requirement to become a civil servant. He then continued to doctoral level, specializing in linguistics. In 1929, Johan underwent his doctoral examination. After graduating, he began serving as a civil servant on 13 August 1929.

== Career during the colonial period ==
Polak received his first assignment in East Java and was assigned there on 7 November 1929. He departed from Rotterdam for Batavia on November 16 to carry out his official duties. He began serving in Bondowoso on 13 June 1930. Apart from being a civil servant, he also sat as a member of the local Regentschapsraad. Polak was then transferred to Bojonegoro in November 1931, where he became adspirant-controleur (potential controller).

He eventually became controller for land affairs in West Kalimantan and then controller of village socio-economic affairs in Cirebon. He was also the Cirebon residency secretary. During World War II, Polak served at the Batavia Residency.

Long before the Japanese army landed in Indonesia, Major Polak was a member of the Indische Sociaal Democratische Partij (ISDP) and Sociaal-Democratische Arbeiderspartij (SDAP). Both accommodate social democratic groups such as Polak.

During the Japanese occupation, Polak became a Japanese prisoner of war. As an Indo, Polak became the target of suspicion from the Kempeitai (Japanese secret police). The Japanese captured Polak and took him prisoner in Padang. After his release, he was involved in the Japanese anti-fascist movement Eenheid door Democratie (EDD) in Cirebon.

After Japan lost, he and the romusha (Dutch and native) were treated in Singapore. In Singapore, Polak worked at the Netherlands Bureau for Documentation and Registration of Indonesians. At the end of 1945, Polak returned to Indonesia and worked again as a colonial employee. Initially, he worked as a controller in Jakarta until around March 1946. Polak was then involved in the establishment of the State of East Indonesia (NIT) at the end of 1946 as translator.

Since January 1947, Polak was appointed as a resident assistant attached to the council of Balinese kings called Paruman Agung.

After the Dutch-Indonesian Round Table Conference and recognition of sovereignty on 27 December 1949, NIT disbanded. Within the NIT parliament, there are members like Arnold Mononutu who support the Republic of Indonesia. When NIT merged into the United States of Indonesia (RIS), NIT parliament members also entered the RIS parliament. Major Polak was among those who took part in it.

== Later years ==
RIS then disbanded in August 1950 and Indonesia became a republic again. At this time, Polak chose to remain in Indonesia and even become a citizen. He then became a member of the DPR RI representing Indo-European citizens. Since 1950, he has been a Hindu and has the Balinese name Nyoman Sukarma.

Polak was then recruited into the Indonesian Socialist Party (PSI) led by former Prime Minister Sutan Sjahrir. However, in 1957 he resigned from politics and the parliament and devoted himself to the world of education and writing books.

Outside the political realm, Polak is also remembered by name in sociological studies in Indonesia. Polak released several sociology books, including Sociology: A Concise Introduction (1960), Introduction to the Sociology of Industry and Companies (1966), and Introduction to the Sociology of Knowledge, Law and Politics (1967). Major Polak's name also appears in Sociology textbooks in high school.

Major Polak was also involved in the establishment of the Malang Economic College (PTEM) on 27 June 1957. PTEM was the embryo of the Faculty of Economics and Business, Brawijaya University. At that time, Major Polak led PTEM while also working at the Faculty of Teacher Training and Education (FKIP) Airlangga University. He died of old age on 30 November 1982, in Denpasar, Bali.
