= Ahmad Sadali =

Indonesian painter (1924–1987)

- Born: 24 July 1924; Garut, West Jawa, Dutch East Indies
- Died: 19 September 1987 (aged 63); Bandung, Indonesia
- Education: Fine Art ISI-Yogyakarta, Jakarta (1948-1953); Lecturer of Fine Art ITB, Bandung (1953); Fine Art, State University, Iowa, AS (1956); Teacher College, Columbia University, NY, AS (1957); Art Student League, NY, AS (1957)
- Known for: Painter, Lecturer Bandung Institute of Technology
- Spouse: Hajjah Siti Atikah
- Children: 1

Ahmad Sadali (24 Juli 1924 – 19 September 1987) came from a family with diversified batik and printing businesses. He was an Indonesian painter and art lecturer who was well-known for his abstract art, especially Abstract expressionism, and Cubism and Color field painting. Sadali was among the first and leading students of Ries Mulder, that represented "The Bandung School" of Indonesian art. He is considered one of the most important Indonesian modernist artists, and his works are among the highest priced Indonesian in International art markets. His signature Abstract style expresses elements of nature and spirituality in a bold yet nuanced manner.

== Life ==
Together with his twelve siblings, Sadali, the seventh child, has never had a problem with the cost of studying. His father, Haji Muhammad Djamhari, was a prominent figure in the Muhammadiyah Muslim organization in Garut, West Java. Sadali's father owned several fruit garden and rice fields, as well as a printing businessman and he was an active batik merchant. Sadali spent his education at HIS Boedi Priyayi Garut (1938) starting from kindergarten. He then went to the Muhammadiyah madrasah MULO and continued his later education in Yogyakarta. Between 1944 and 1945, he entered the Jakarta Islamic College.

From 1948 to 1953, Sadali studied at the Faculty of Drawing Teachers at the Faculty of Engineering, University of Indonesia, which is now known as FSRD, at the Bandung Institute of Technology (ITB). There, Sadali was the first student of Ries Mulder, a Dutch painter and lecturer who helped establish the establishment of the Department of Fine Arts at ITB. After completing his studies, he was appointed as a lecturer at ITB. In 1956, he received a scholarship to study fine arts in the United States. He studied fine arts at the Department of Fine Arts, University of Iowa, and the New York Art Student League. In his academic journey, he has earned the title of professor.

Ahmad Sadali was also one of the founders of the Bandung Islamic University - UNISBA, and his name is listed in the deed of establishment from 1958.

His career started as a teaching staff at ITB, then became Secretary and Head of the Department of Fine Arts-ITB and finally became assistant to the Rector of ITB (1969-1976) with the title Professor Drs. Ahmad Sadali.

Early in his career, the cubist painting style of Ries Mulder strongly influenced Sadali, similar to other Mulder students at the ITB. This abstract style in the Bandung University surprised various parties in the world of Indonesian art. The critic Trisno Soemardjo accused this new trend of being a "Western Laboratory Servant". Later this style also became known as the style of the "Bandung School".

Sadali was married to his wife Hajjah Siti Atikah, and they have one son, Rafi Ahmad Salim. In 2014, Rafi wrote the foreword to the important Solo exhibition of his father in 2014, which was organized and held by the National Gallery of Indonesia.

== Works ==
Ahmad Sadali was a pioneer of modern Abstract art in Indonesia. Together with other graduates of the Bandung Institute of Technology, ITB, such as A.D. Pirous and Sunaryo, he found his voice in abstraction, laying the path for generations of Indonesian artists who emphasize the intuitive power of color and gesture. Meanwhile, artists in America – including the likes of Jackson Pollock, Clyfford Still, Willem de Kooning and Mark Rothko – also began to break new ground in the genre, drawing attention to the very act of painting.

One of the striking characteristics of Sadali's work was the choice of geometric shapes and colors in his work. The description of Sadali's work in the latest book contains the first article entitled "Ahmad Sadali Pioneer of Indonesian Abstract Painting." This paper explains that Sadali believed life to be worship in order to seek the pleasure of Allah. These two descriptions summarize Sadali's main role in modern Abstract art in Indonesia, which he had from 1950 until his death.

In the book The New Indonesian Painting Art, An Introduction, Sanento Yuliman notes a description of Ahmad Sadali's Abstract Art:

"In 1963, Ahmad Sadali abandoned geometric abstraction. The canvas shows brilliant colors that are wide and do not depict any object. In later developments, Sadali's canvases offer muted colors such as earth ochre, deep blue and black. Texture is indeed an important war. This texture appears as if it was created by various forces and processes in nature; tension and shrinkage, cracking and breaking, peeling and tearing, erosion and weathering, ageing and crushing."

The National Gallery of Indonesia describes Sadali's style as follows:

"As a pure abstract painter, Sadali has indeed been separated from the representation of natural forms. However, in visual language all the forms presented by the artist can be read with various levels of interpretation. In the age of existing civilization, humans have been awakened unconsciously by signs that can universally evoke a certain spirit. Bold colors, dots and holes, and strokes on the plane can recall images of mystery, antiquity, and mortality. Triangular sign, pyramid construction gives the image of religiosity. Furthermore, molten gold and calligraphy strokes of the Koran can radiate Islamic spirituality. All of these signs are present in Sadali's painting, so the expression that appears is the crystallization of contemplation of religious values, mystery, and death."

Among his notable students were Farida Srihadi, Srihadi Soedarsono and Umi Dachlan.

Ahmad Sadali was one of Indonesia's leading painters, and his paintings are displayed in the collections of the National Gallery Singapore and the National Gallery of Indonesia, Jakarta.

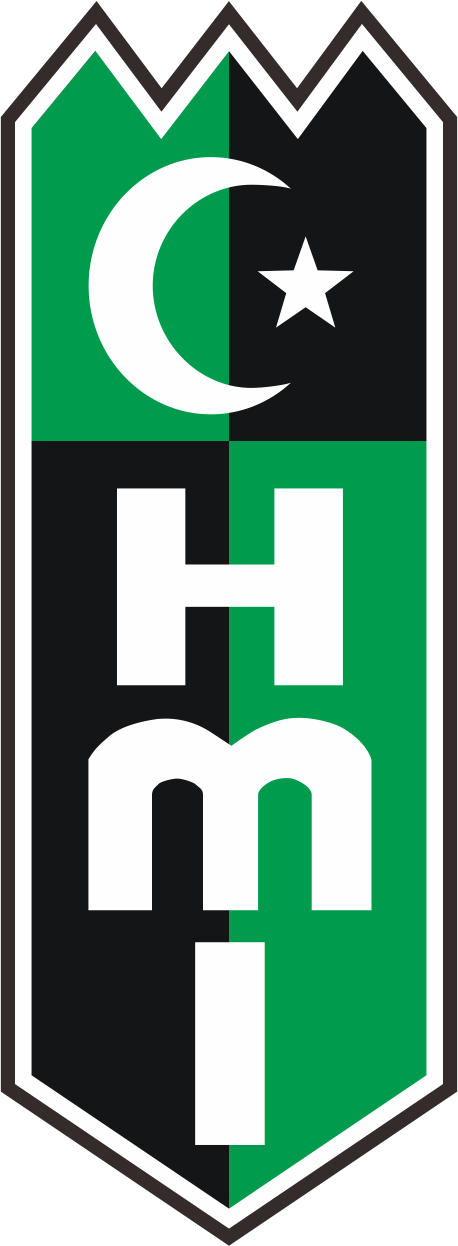
Logo HMI

Logo PUPR

Sadali continued to develop new ideas in his work, especially after his return from the United States. The tendency of abstract and Islamic calligraphy is getting stronger coloring his works. He became known as a painter with religious calligraphy nuances, including the logo for the Islamic Student Association and the PU (now Ministry of PUPR) logo.

Sadali was quite productive working in various forms, including sketches, graphics, sculptures, interiors and murals. He has worked on a number of monumental works, including wall paintings at the MPR/DPR and Hilton Hotels, Jakarta, and supergraphics at the Pusri Recreational Park, Palembang:

- Mural at Inner Harbour No 3, Samudra Pura, Tanjung Priok, Jakarta, 1960
- Mural at Yacht Club Jakarta, Kartika Bahari, 1962
- Senior Designer for the interior and furniture of the Indonesian Parliament Building, Gedung DPR/MPR, Jakarta, Indonesia, 1964-1966
- Murals at the Gedung DPR/MPR, Jakarta: The Garden of Justice for the secretariat, and Witness for the Komitee Conference Room, 1966
- Senior Designer for the interior and furniture of the Pavillon Indonesia, Osaka, Japan at the EXPO 1970
- Mural Revealed Golden Layers for the Hilton Executive Club, Jakarta, Indonesia, 1974
- Supergraphic Permainan Air, 1976
- Supergraphic Pengantar Taqwa at the recreation area PUSRI, Palembang, 1978

In 1982, Sadali restored a mural in the MPR/DPR building with his students.

=== Group 18 ===
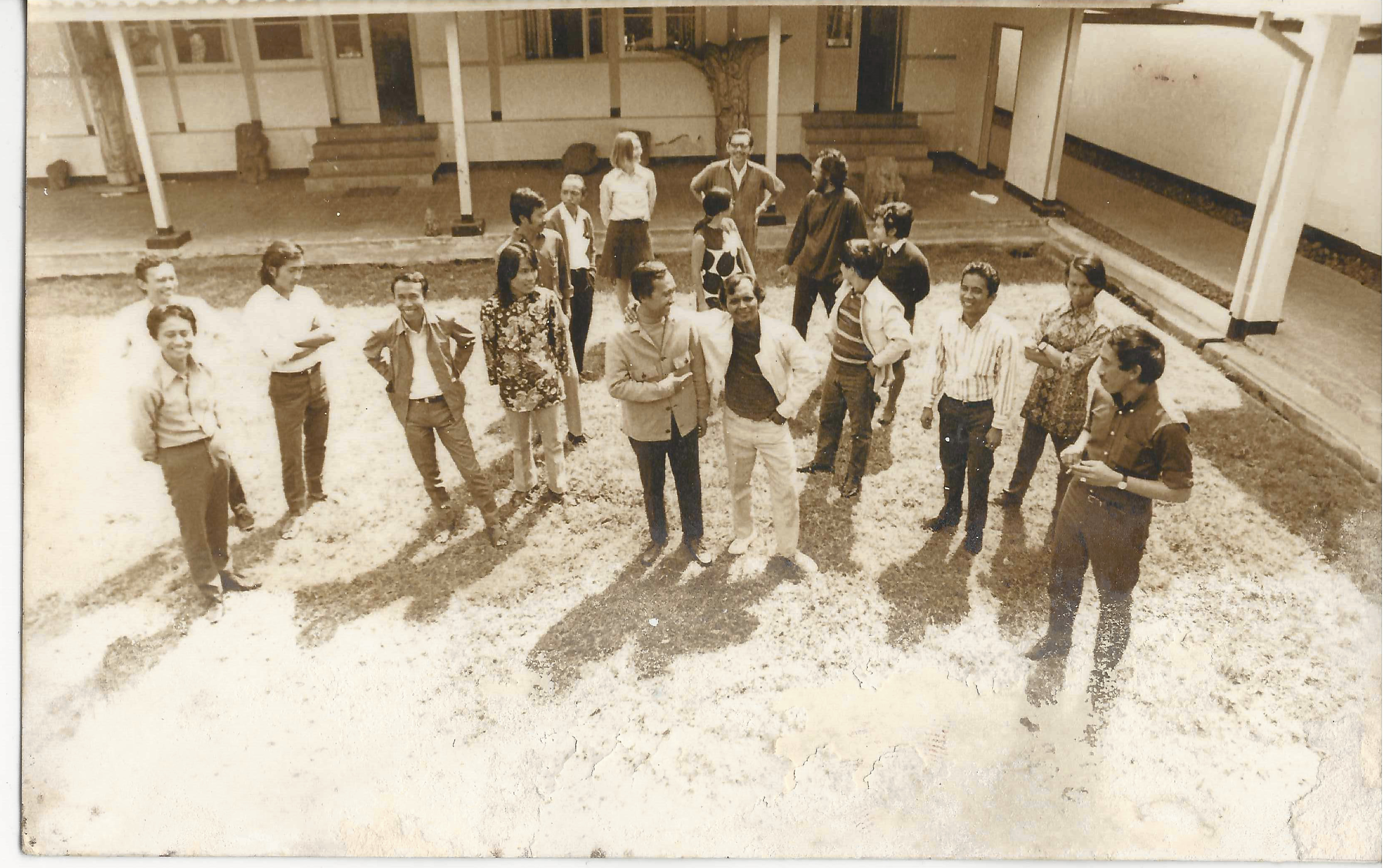
Members of Group 18 on 18 August 1971. Ahmad Sadali on the far right in the front row

In 1971, artists and lecturers of Fine Arts at the Bandung Institute of Technology, ITB, formed Group 18. They included Abdul Djalil Pirous, Ahmad Sadali, Mochtar Apin, But Muchtar, Erna Pirous, Haryadi Suadi, Yusuf Affendi, Kaboel Suadi, Rita Widagdo, Rustam Arief, Samsudin Hardjakusumah, Sanento Yuliman, G. Sidharta, Srihadi Soedarsono, Sunaryo, Surya Pernawa, T. Sutanto and Umi Dachlan.

The group produced an edition of black and white screen prints with works from 18 artists under the name Group 18. Senior painter A.D. Pirous raised calligraphy works, Sunaryo presented a woman's body lying down, Umi Dachlan presented an abstract composition, as well as Sam Bimbo with a composition of horizontal and vertical lines.

According to Gallery Director Soemardja Aminudin TH Siregar, these dozens of works are part of the history of the acceptance of screen printing techniques or screen printing as part of graphic art in Indonesia in the 1970s. "There is a possibility that the project is related to Andy Warhol's pop-art in the 70s which was also screen printing. This exhibition of Group 18 works is a common thread for the development of contemporary graphic arts in Indonesia."

The Group 18 is also reminiscent of the group of The Irascible 18, a group of 18 abstract artists in the United States that was formed around 1950. The members objected to the selection of art from an exhibition at the Museum of Modern Art in New York. The group of American abstract artists signed an open letter of protest addressed to Roland L. Redmond, then President of the Metropolitan Museum of Art, in 1950. The letter was written in response to an announcement that Redmond was holding a national competition to select works for inclusion in a monumental exhibition entitled " American Painting Today".

Similar to the Irascible 18, the 18 artists of the Bandung School represented contemporary artists who reflect American Modern Art with Indonesian elements, which deviate from existing traditional Indonesian art.

== Awards ==
Since 1952 in his early career, Sadali received numerous awards worldwide for his works and teachings:

- Award from the National Cultural Consultative Body, 1952
- Anugerah Seni Negara Award of the Indonesian Government, 1972
- Award of the first National Painting Exhibition, Biennale Lukisan Indonesia in Jakarta, 1974
- Award of the Australian Government for his "Leadership in Islam", 1977
- Third place UNESCO prize for the poster design "1979 Year of the Child", 1978
- Award of the National Painting Exhibition Biennale Lukisan Indonesia in Jakarta, 1978

Sadali is also one of the founders of the Islamic College or what is now known as the Islamic University of Bandung - UNISBA. At the end of his life, he served as general chairman of the Salman Mosque Development ITB.

== Exhibitions ==
Sadali was one of the early and leading artists of abstract art in Indonesia. As a painter, he succeeded in developing his works in a unique way and became one of the important examples in interpreting the thoughts and principles of modernism in Indonesian art. As an important sign that gives aesthetic characteristics to the early development of Indonesian abstract art called Lyricism.

=== Solo exhibitions ===
- "Contemporary Indonesian Art" Rio de Jeinero, Brasil, 1964
- Sebelas Seniman Bandung, 1966
- Goethe-Institut, Jakarta, Indonesia, 1970
- "Painting Retrospective" Cipta Galeri, Taman Izmail Marzuki, Jakarta, Indonesia, 1972
- "Screenprint Retrospective" Cipta Galeri, Taman Izmail Marzuki, Jakarta, Indonesia, 1976
- Salle de Spectacle, ITB, Bandung, 1979
- "Paintings by Sadali" Erasmus-Huis, Jakarta, Indonesia, 1987
- "The hidden works and thoughts of Ahmad Sadali" Edwin Galeri, Jakarta, Indonesia. 17.- 26. October 1997
- "Exhibition of an Indonesian Master Painter" National Gallery of Indonesia, 25 June - 14 July 2014

=== Group exhibitions ===
In addition to the solo exhibition, since 1951 Ahmad Sadali's paintings have been exhibited in more than 75 group exhibitions worldwide. Here a selection of Sadali's important group exhibitions:

- Pameran Seni Rupa Mahasiswa, United States, organized by the Ministry of Education, Minister Dr. Badher Djohan, 1951
- Pameran Seni Rupa, Cultural Office, Peking, China, 1953
- Indonesian Art Exhibition, New Delhi, India and Hanoi, Vietnam, 1957
- Bianco e Nero, Lugano, Italy, 1959
- Arte Contemporanea Indonesia, Rio de Jainero, Brasil, 1964
- The Unseen Contemporary Indonesian Art', Bangkok, Thailand, 1967
- Indonesian Painting Exhibition, Indonesian foreign Ministry, Church Center, New York City, NY, United States, 1970
- Art Festival of the United World College, Singapore, 1979
- Exhibition of Islamic Calligraphic Painting, Jedda dan Riyadh, Saudi Arabia, 1985
- Membaca: Ahmad Sadali & Fajar Sidik, Kurator Agus Burhan, Rektor ISI Yogya. Forum Literasi Seni Rupa, 20–22 Juli 2017, Yogyakarta, Indonesia
- Investigating the Collection: National Collection of Fine Arts Exhibition, National Gallery Indonesia, Jakarta, 10–28 October 2018.

== Bibliography ==
=== Books by Ahmad Sadali ===
- "Seni kaligrafi Islam". Dr. Sirajuddin AR and Prof. Dr. Ahmad Sadali. Pustaka Panjimas, 1985, 290 pages. OCLC 849727456

=== Monographs about Ahmad Sadali ===
- "Tema Islami seni lukis Ahmad Sadali". Monograph by Hamzah, Amir. Bachelor thesis, published by FSR ISI, Yogyakarta, 1998, 104 pages
- "The hidden works and [sic] thoughts of Ahmad Sadali". Monograph by Ahmad Sadali, Jim Supangkat and Edwin Galeri. Jakarta, 1997. Indonesian language, 57 pages
- "Picturing Islam: Art and Ethics in a Muslim Lifeworld". Monograph by Kenneth M. George, John Wiley & Sons 2011, English, 184 pages. ISBN 978-1444359794
- "Sadali: Works - Thoughts - Interpretations". Exhibition Monograph 25.Juni - 14.Juli 2014. National Gallery of Indonesia, Jakarta, 2014. Indonesian language, 68 works, 114 pages

=== General Art Literature ===
- "Bandung: The Laboratory of the West?". Helena Spanjaard in: Modern Indonesian Art, 1945-1990. Published by Fischer, Berkeley, CA, USA, 1990, pages 54–77. Includes 3 paintings of Ahmad Sadali. ISBN 978-0295971414
- "In Words In Colours - Ketiga Kata Ketika Warna". Poetry and Colours - Puisi dan Luisan. Published by Yayasan Ananda; 1st Edition in English and Indonesian, 1995. Includes 3 paintings of Ahmad Sadali, pages 132-137. ISBN 978-9798424038
- "Indonesian Heritage: Visual Art". Hildawati Soemantri, published by Editions Didier Miller, Singapore, 1998. Includes 3 paintings of Ahmad Sadali. ISBN 978-9813018310
- "Modern Indonesian Art: From Raden Saleh to the Present Day." Koes Karnadi et al, Published by Koes Artbooks, Denpasar, Bali. 2nd rev. Ed. 2010. ISBN 978-9798704024
- "Artists and their Inspiration. A Guide Through Indonesian Art History (1930-2015)." Helena Spanjaard. LM Publishers, Volendam, The Netherlands, 2016. Includes 3 paintings of Ahmad Sadali, pages 92–93. ISBN 978-9460223877

=== Video and Internet ===
- "Works Of Maestro Ahmad Sadali : Exhibition at the National Gallery" (Indonesian Language) Youtube, chanel ay, 02.Juli 2014
- "Ahmad Sadali : Dhikr Through Art Work" (Indonesian Language) Youtube, Studio Kotak-Katik, 14.Agustus 2020
- "Ahmad Sadali : Spiritualism and Mysticism of Islam" (Indonesian Language) Youtube, Bentara Budaya, 06.Oktober 2020
