= Ries Mulder =

Dutch painter

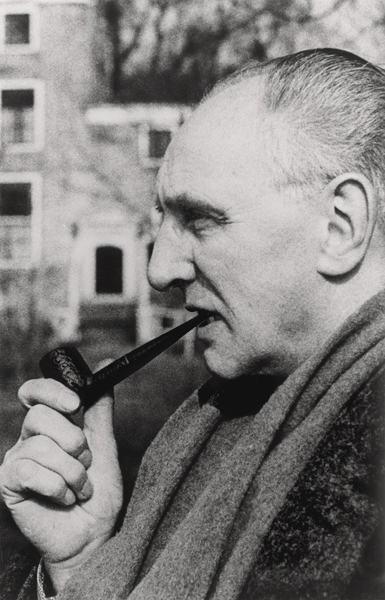
Ries Mulder

Marinus (Ries) Mulder (1 January 1909 in IJsselstein, The Netherlands – 19 December 1973 in IJsselstein) was a Dutch painter, lecturer and writer. His painting style was influenced by Cubism, which he taught during his tenure as a leading lecturer of Modern Art in Indonesia.

== Dutch Period until 1940 ==
Ries grew up in a family of ten children. After three years at the Hogere Burgerschool he studied painting in Utrecht and decided to become a painter. Ries apprenticed to the painter Piet van Wijngaerdt. He also made contact with Otto van Rees (artist), Lambert Simon and Charles Eyck. Between 1933 and 1939, he assisted Charles Eyck in creating several frescoes, including frescoes in the Genazzano convent of the Augustinian sisters in Utrecht and in churches in Limburg (including Sint-Hubertuskerk (Genhout)).

Ries also contributed to the handover. van Charles Eyck at the World's Fair in Paris in 1937. From 1936 to 1939, he participated in various group exhibitions called "Youth of Utrecht", also known as the "School of Utrecht". Many of these exhibitions were organized by the Art Love Society ( founded 1807), which is still located on Nobelstraat 12 in Utrecht. During this time, Ries mainly painted landscapes and still life. He also exhibited at Consthuys Sint Pieter, Achter Sint Pieter, 16 in Utrecht. This exhibition has the motto "Art doesn't have to be expensive", and the first year the price of a work of art was a maximum of 25 guilders, which was increased to 50 guilders in 1937. Works by Breitner, Paul Citroen, Wally Moes, Otto van Rees and by many others are on display. In his mid-thirties he shared a studio at 55 Oude Gracht with Otto van Rees and Gerrit Rietveld. The studio is located above the office of the publisher of the magazine “Community, the monthly magazine for Catholic Reconstruction”. From this magazine emerged the division “The New Community” where Ries made several illustrations. He also wrote many books and periodicals, including The Windrose in 1940 (De Windroos - yearbook for Catholic youth) and Sundial in 1940 (Zonnewijzer - Almanac for Catholic families).

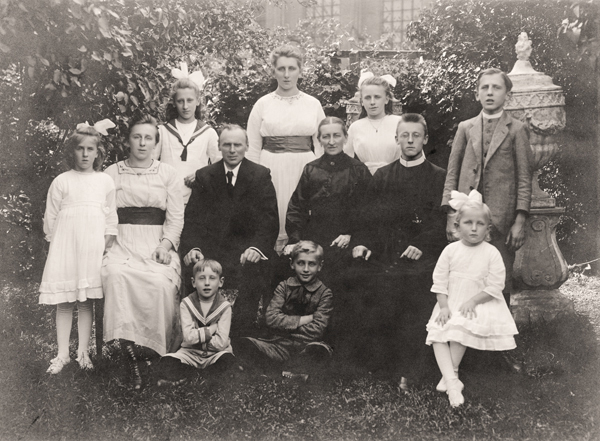
Photo of the Mulder family

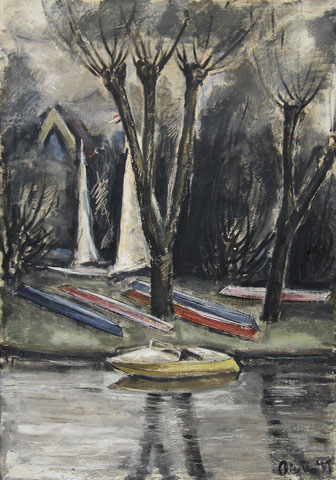
1937 Canoe at the River Lek

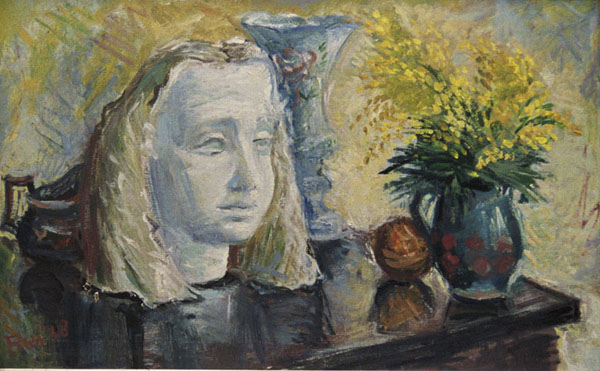
1938 Painting with Mimosas

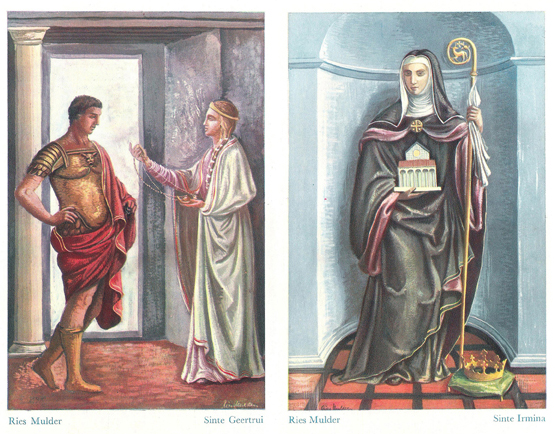
1940 Illustration for the book The Wind Rose

Otto van Rees influenced the cubist painting style of Ries Mulder, while Charles Eyck encouraged his figurative painting.

== First Indonesian Period 1940-1946 ==
In 1940 Ries was invited by a friend to make a research visit in Indonesia. Excerpt from an interview in Utrechts Nieuwsblad: “On the one hand I am very curious about the Indies, the tropical landscape and the people there, on the other hand I love the Netherlands, the sky and the beautiful atmosphere…”. On 7 February 1940 he departed by ship from Trieste, Italy. He took forty still lifes, interiors and landscapes of Limburg in the Netherlands. These paintings were unfortunately lost during the Japanese occupation of Indonesia. Ries Mulder had lived in Magelang and Jakarta. Here he received many portrait commissions from wealthy Chinese families. He wanted to return after one year, but the war took him seven years. For five years she was imprisoned in the Japanese internment camps Tjilatjap, Tjimahi (Cimahi) and Pekanbaru, where she worked as a barracks nurse or in a military hospital. At the Cimahi camp he made many stage sets from simple materials.

== Dutch Period 1946-1948 ==
In 1946 Ries returned to The Netherlands where he shared a studio with Otto van Rees in Utrecht. Together with Daan Wildschut, he again helped Charles Eyck, this time he helped to paint the walls and ceiling of the Church of Our Lady in Helmod.

During this period, Ries developed his own Cubist style.

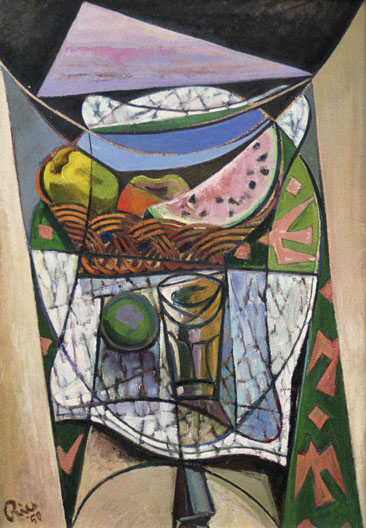
1950 Stilllife with Fruit Bowl

== Second Indonesian Period 1948-1958 ==
During world War II, Ries met in the Japanese prison camp and together they made plans to start training art teachers in Bandung. Finally, in 1947, Simon Admiraal got permission from the Dutch Government to start the Art Teacher University Course in Bandung. In 1948 Ries was invited by the Ministry of Education. He started his career as a painting and art appreciation teacher in Bandung. The training is intended for Indonesian students who have only been able to go abroad to attend the training. In 1950 the art teacher training turned into a fine arts academy: the Indonesian Fine Arts Academy (ASRI). This training is part of the Bandung Technical University, currently the Bandung Institute of Technology. The accompanying teachers are Simon Admiraal (drawing), Piet Pijpers (crafts) and Jack Zeylemaker (decorative drawing). The teaching method was developed by Ries himself. During the eleven years Ries lived in Indonesia, he continued to work on his trademark style. Before the war he mainly made figurative and impressionistic paintings, but his work is now increasingly abstract and the influence of Otto van Rees and Charles Eyck is evident. Georges Braque and Picasso also inspired him. Subjects are laid out into angular geometric shapes, separated from each other by sharp black lines (stained glass). The Bandung period was characterized by the modernist cole de Paris style, then the Cubist style changed to a strict geometric-abstract canvas arrangement. His style is very modern compared to most other Dutch painters in Indonesia.

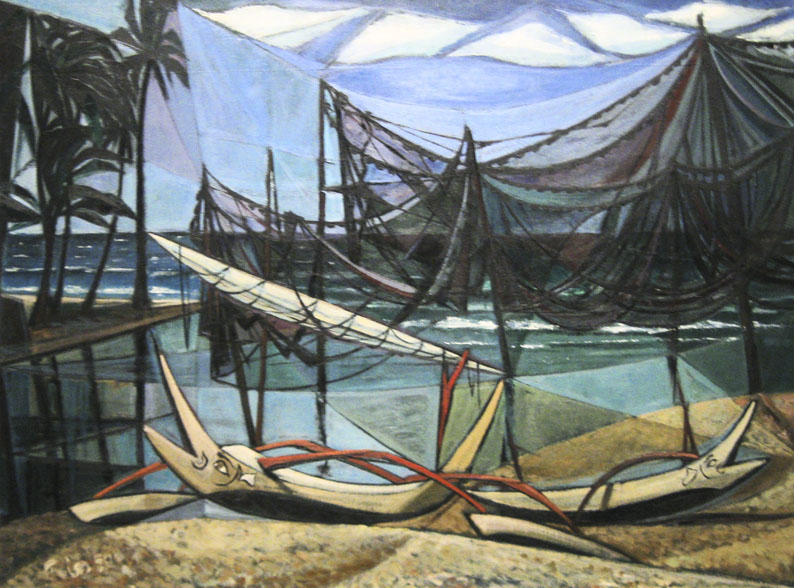
1950 Ships in Bali

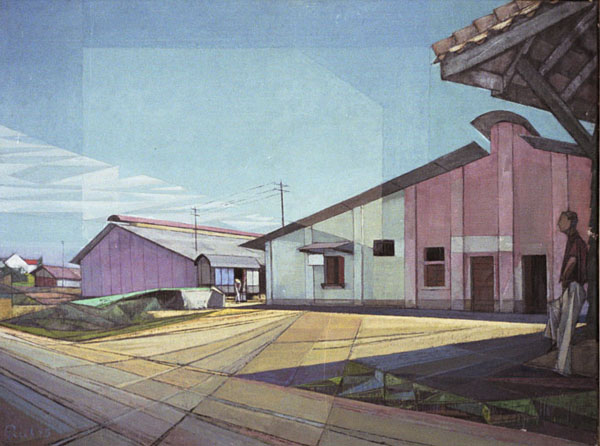
1953 Train station in Jawa

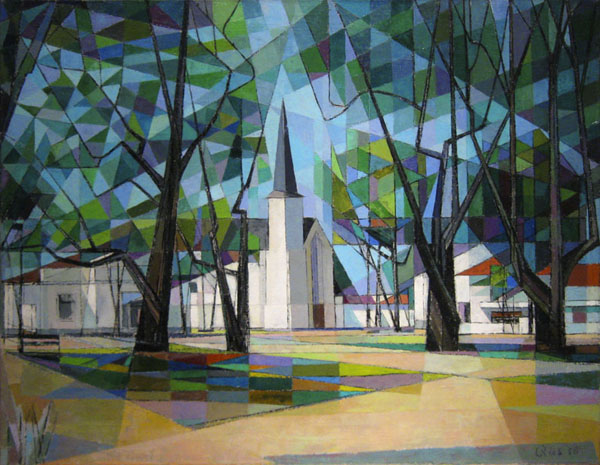
1958 Church in Bandung

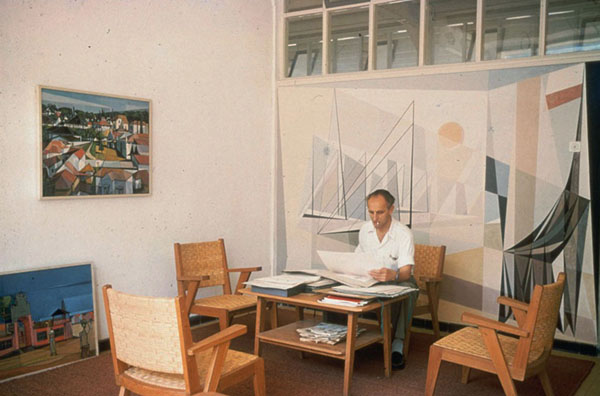
1956 Ries in his studio in Bandung

Naturally, his disciples were affected by this. Until then, Indonesian artists mostly painted figurative, expressionistic, or impressionistic.

The abstract movement in Indonesia emerged from Bandung, West Java. As both a painter and lecturer, Ries Mulder, began inserting abstract art into his teaching at the Bandung Institute of Technology (ITB) in the 1950s, hence giving birth to a new generation of artists, such as But Muchtar, Mochtar Apin, Ahmad Sadali and Rita Widagdo. Several of Ries Mulder's students went on to become famous artists, as the Dutch art historian Dr. Helena Spanjaard describes: " Mulder is highly important; he educated some of the best Indonesian painters."

- A.D. Pirous b. 1932
- Ahmad Sadali 1924-1987
- But Muchtar 1930-1993
- Mochtar Apin 1923-1995
- Popo Iskandar 1927-2000
- Srihadi Soedarsono 1931-
- Rita Widagdo b. 1939

Ries Mulder's influence on the development of modern Indonesian art is enormous. Through his style and way of teaching art history and art appreciation, young Indonesian artists became acquainted with Western styles and thoughts. For Bandung's conservative art world, this style was very modern. Internationally oriented Dutch and Indonesian elites highly appreciated this work, and the ITB Bandung was eager to keep up with international developments in the arts. In 1954 Ries Mulder held a solo exhibition at the Kunstkring Bandungse.
In the same year 1954, assistant teachers and students of the Art Faculty in Bandung organized an exhibition for 11 painters, that featured their experimentation in a cubist style. This exhibition showed works of Ahmad Sadali, But Muchtar, Popo Iskandar and Kartono Yodhukusumo created significant furor and controversy. The painter and art critic Trisno Sumardjo decried the works as "bloodless, formal, self-absorbed, not grounded in the reality of their country and its environment and social issues". It was this exhibition, that started the debate "East versus West", e.g. criticizing Ries Mulder as eradicating Indonesian art values by conveying European norms.

== Dutch Period 1959-1973 ==
In 1958 during a conflict called the West New Guinea dispute Sukarno severed all ties with The Netherlands because the Dutch refused to hand over Papua New Guinea to Indonesia. The Dutch in Indonesia were given a choice: take Indonesian citizenship or leave the country. Ries Mulder decided to return to The Netherlands in 1959, much to the chagrin of his students. From 1959, Ries Mulder lived with his three sisters in the house at Achtersloot in IJsselstein. It was difficult for him to return to Holland. He made many trips to the Dordogne, Spain and North Africa. His later works consist mainly of cityscapes in soft pastel colors, built on geometric planes and separated from each other by black contours. Ries Mulder died in 1973 in IJsselstein. After his death, a retrospective of his work was held in 1994 at the IJsselstein City Museum. In 2009 several of his paintings and personal belongings were exhibited at the exhibition "Beyond the Dutch: Indonesia, The Netherlands And The Visual Arts From 1900 To Present" at the Central Museum in Utrecht.

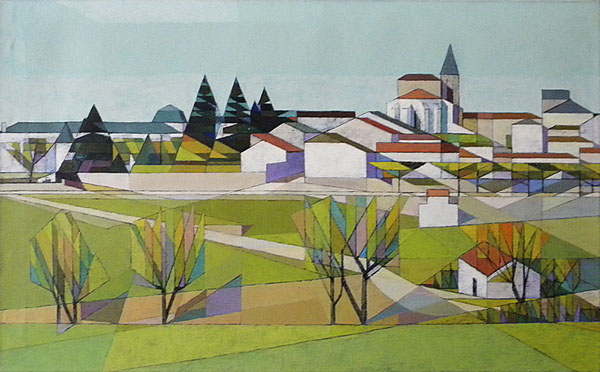
1965 Ste. Alvere

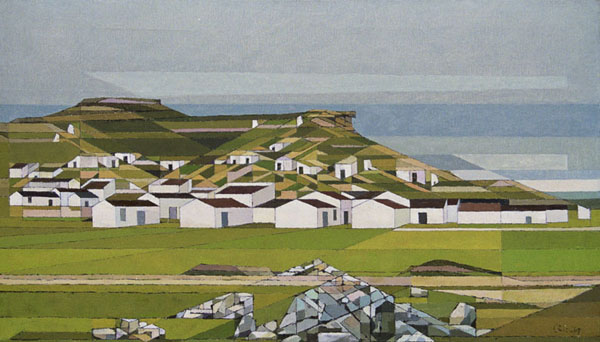
1967 Milagros

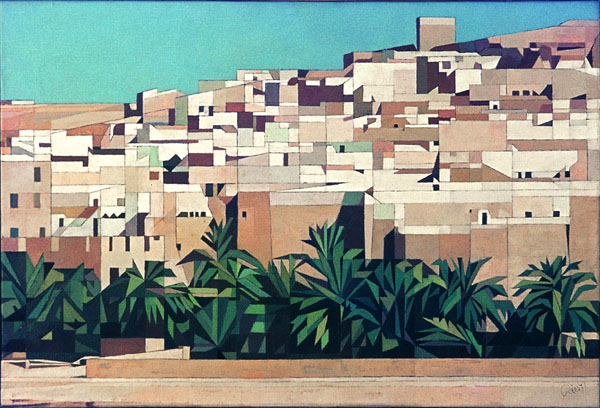
1971 Chardia I

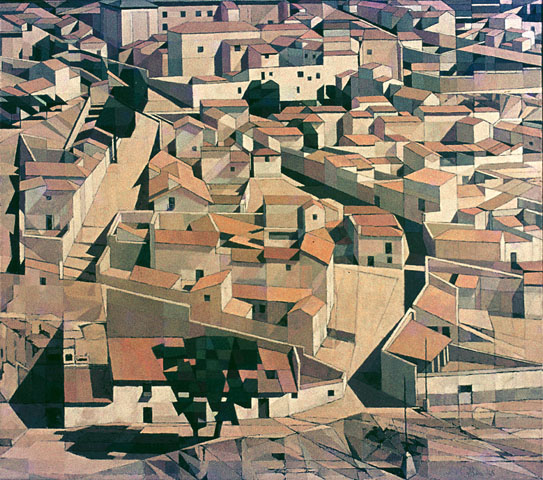
Cityscape

== Literature ==
- Holt, Claire, Art in Indonesia: Continuities and Change, 1967 Cornell University Press, 355 pgs ISBN 978-0801401886
- Moderne Indonesische Schilderkunst, Helena Spanjaard 2003, Uitgeverij Uniepers ISBN 9068253034
- Beyond the Dutch, diverse auteurs 2009, KIT Publishers ISBN 978-9460220562
- Otto van Rees, diverse auteurs 2005, Uitgeverij Waanders ISBN 9040088047
- Charles Eyck, kunstenaar tussen vernieuwing en traditie, diverse auteurs 1997, Stichting Historische Reeks Maastricht ISBN 9070356880
- Archief Utrechts Nieuwsblad
- Familie Archief Brugman-Mulder
- Artists and the Roelofs couple. The Commanderie Gemmert, Jan. 2011 (in Dutch)
