= Sartono Kartodirdjo =

Indonesian historian (1921–2007)

- Born: 15 February 1921; Wonogiri, Dutch East Indies
- Died: 7 December 2007 (aged 86); Yogyakarta, Indonesia
- Occupation: Historian

Aloysius Sartono Kartodirdjo (15 February 1921 – 7 December 2007) was an Indonesian historian. A pioneer in Indonesia's postcolonial historiography, he was and is considered one of the most influential historians in the country.

== Early life and education ==
Sartono was born in Wonogiri Regency, in the southeastern part of Central Java Province, on 15 February 1921. He was the last of three children in an Abangan family. He studied at colonial schools, with his father Tjitrosarojo an employee of the postal service. Tjitrosarojo wanted Sartono to become a doctor, but the latter rejected claiming his fear of blood. Sartono had developed an interest in history during his teenage years, having stayed in the vicinity of Borobudur Temple for a month.

== Career ==
After graduating from MULO, Sartono for a time enrolled at a Brother's School before becoming a schoolteacher in 1941. Following Indonesia's independence and the end of the Indonesian National Revolution, he enrolled at the University of Indonesia in 1950, graduating in 1956 and beginning to teach at Gadjah Mada University before continuing his studies at Yale University between 1962 and 1964.

At Yale, Sartono studied under Harry J. Benda, and then studied under W.F. Wertheim at Amsterdam University. During his time in the Netherlands, Sartono found archival records of the 1888 Banten peasants' revolt, which led to his dissertation and later publication. It was the first recipient of the Benda Prize – for first publication in Southeast Asian studies – in 1977. He was made a professor at Gadjah Mada in 1968.

By the 1980s, his eyevision had worsened rendering him nearly blind. However, he continued to teach and release commentaries. He was part of a team of historians tasked by the New Order government to compile a National History series, however, the final volume of the series was blocked by Sartono, as he did not want to align with the government's account of the 1965 coup.

=== Style ===
Sartono pioneered the postcolonial historiography now widespread among Indonesian historians, using social and cultural analysis at a grassroots level not unlike India's Subaltern Studies. He presented complex images of history, contrary to the simplified, nationalistic history which was commonly spread during his time by the New Order government. One such example was Sartono's use of the 1925 political manifesto by Perhimpoenan Indonesia as the key marker of Indonesian nationalism, instead of the 1928 Youth Pledge as commonly used by the Indonesian government.

== Legacy ==
His works are extremely influential in Indonesian history studies, with many of his books becoming key references for future history students. Adrian Vickers, who referred to Sartono as "Indonesia's greatest historian of the twentieth century", noted that most younger historians in Indonesia based their work on Sartono's historiographic paradigms. Many of his students later became Indonesia's leading historians.

The Sartono Kartodirdjo award has been awarded annually by the Indonesian Historical Conference since 2018.

== Family ==
In 1948, Sartono married Sri Kadarjati, who worked as a teacher. The couple had two children.

== Death ==
He died on 7 December 2007 in Yogyakarta, having suffered from illness for a long time by his death. After a funeral ceremony at Gadjah Mada University, he was buried at his family grave in Ungaran, Central Java.

== List of Works ==
- The Peasants' Revolt of Banten in 1888: Its Conditions, Course and Sequel - A Case Study of Social Movements in Indonesia. 's-Gravenhage: Martinus Nijhoff, 1966.
- Sejarah Perlawanan-perlawanan terhadap Kolonialisme. Jakarta: Pusat Sejarah ABRI Departemen Pertahanan Keamanan, 1973
- Protest Movements in Rural Java: A Study of Agrarian Unrest in the Nineteenth and Early Twentieth Centuries. Singapore: Oxford University Press, 1973.
- Sejarah Nasional Indonesia (with Marwati Djoened Poesponegoro and Nugroho Notosusanto). Jakarta: Departemen Pendidikan dan Kebudayaan, 1976
- Masyarakat Kuno dan Kelompok-kelompok Sosial (as editor). Jakarta : Bhratara Karya Aksara, 1977.
- The Pedicab in Yogyakarta : A Study of Low Cost Transportation and Poverty Problems. Yogyakarta: Gadjah Mada University Press, 1981.
- Elite dalam Perspektif Sejarah (as editor). Jakarta: LP3ES, 1981.
- Pemikiran dan Perkembangan Historiografi Indonesia: Suatu Alternatif. Jakarta: Gramedia, 1982.
- Modern Indonesia, Tradition & Transformation: A Socio-historical Perspective. Yogyakarta: Gadjah Mada University Press, 1984.
- Ratu Adil. Jakarta: Sinar Harapan, 1984.
- Kepemimpinan dalam Dimensi Sosial (as editor). Jakarta: LP3ES, 1984.
- Komunikasi dan Kaderisasi dalam Pembangunan Desa (as editor). Yogyakarta: Pusat Penelitian Pembangunan Pedesaan dan Kawasan Univeristas Gadjah Mada and Aditya Media, 1984.
- Ungkapan-ungkapan Filsafat Sejarah Barat dan Timur. Jakarta: Gramedia, 1986.
- Perkembangan Peradaban Priyayi (with A. Sudewo and Suhardjo Hatmosuprobo). Yogyakarta: Gadjah Mada University Press, 1987.
- Pengantar Sejarah Indonesia Baru: 1500-1900. Jakarta: Gramedia, 1987.
- Pesta Demokrasi di Pedesaan: Studi Kasus Pemilihan Kepala Desa di Jawa Tengah dan DIY (as editor). Yogyakarta: Aditya Media, 1992.
- 700 Tahun Majapahit (1293-1993): Suatu Bunga Rampai (with Soekmono, Parmono Atmadi, Edi Sedyawati). Surabaya: Dinas Pariwisata Propinsi Daerah Tingkat I Jawa Timur, 1992.
- Pengantar Sejarah Indonesia Baru: Sejarah Pergerakan Nasional. Jakarta: Gramedia Pustaka Utama, 1993.
- Pendekatan Ilmu Sosial dalam Metodologi Sejarah. Jakarta: Gramedia Pustaka Utama, 1993.
- Pembangunan Bangsa tentang Nasionalisme, Kesadaran dan Kebudayaan Nasional. Yogyakarta: Aditya Media, 1994.
- Indonesian Historiography. Yogyakarta: Kanisius, 2001.
- Sejak Indische sampai Indonesia. Jakarta: Penerbit Buku Kompas, 2005.
