= Charles Eyck =

Dutch painter (1897–1983)

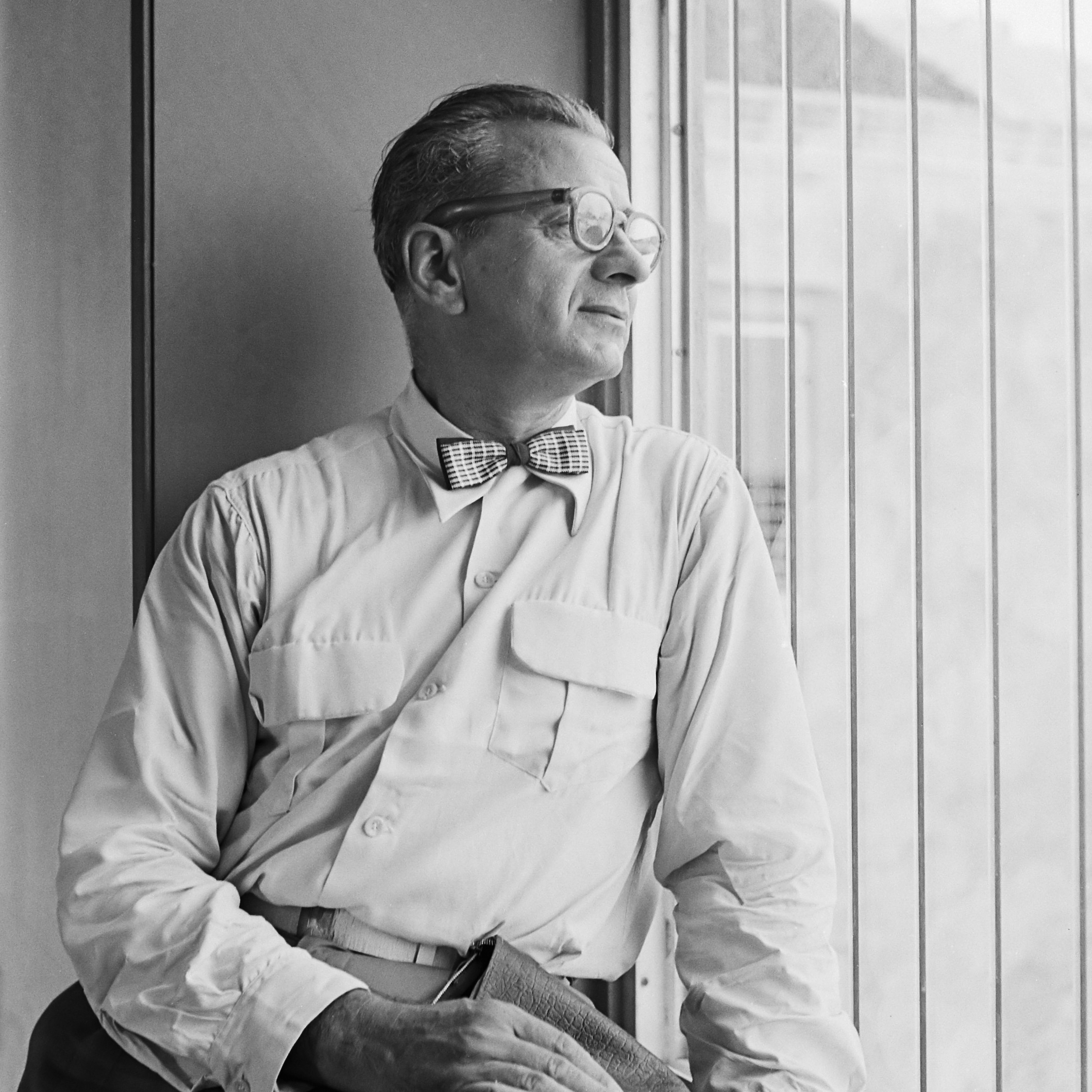
- Eyck in 1953
- Born: 24 March 1897; Meerssen, Limburg, Netherlands
- Died: 2 August 1983 (aged 86); Schimmert, Limburg, Netherlands
- Education: Rijksakademie van beeldende kunsten in Amsterdam
- Known for: Painting
- Movement: Expressionism

Charles Hubert Eyck (24 March 1897 – 2 August 1983) was a Dutch visual artist. Together with Henri Jonas and Joep Nicolas, he was a pioneer of the Limburg School.

== Life and work ==
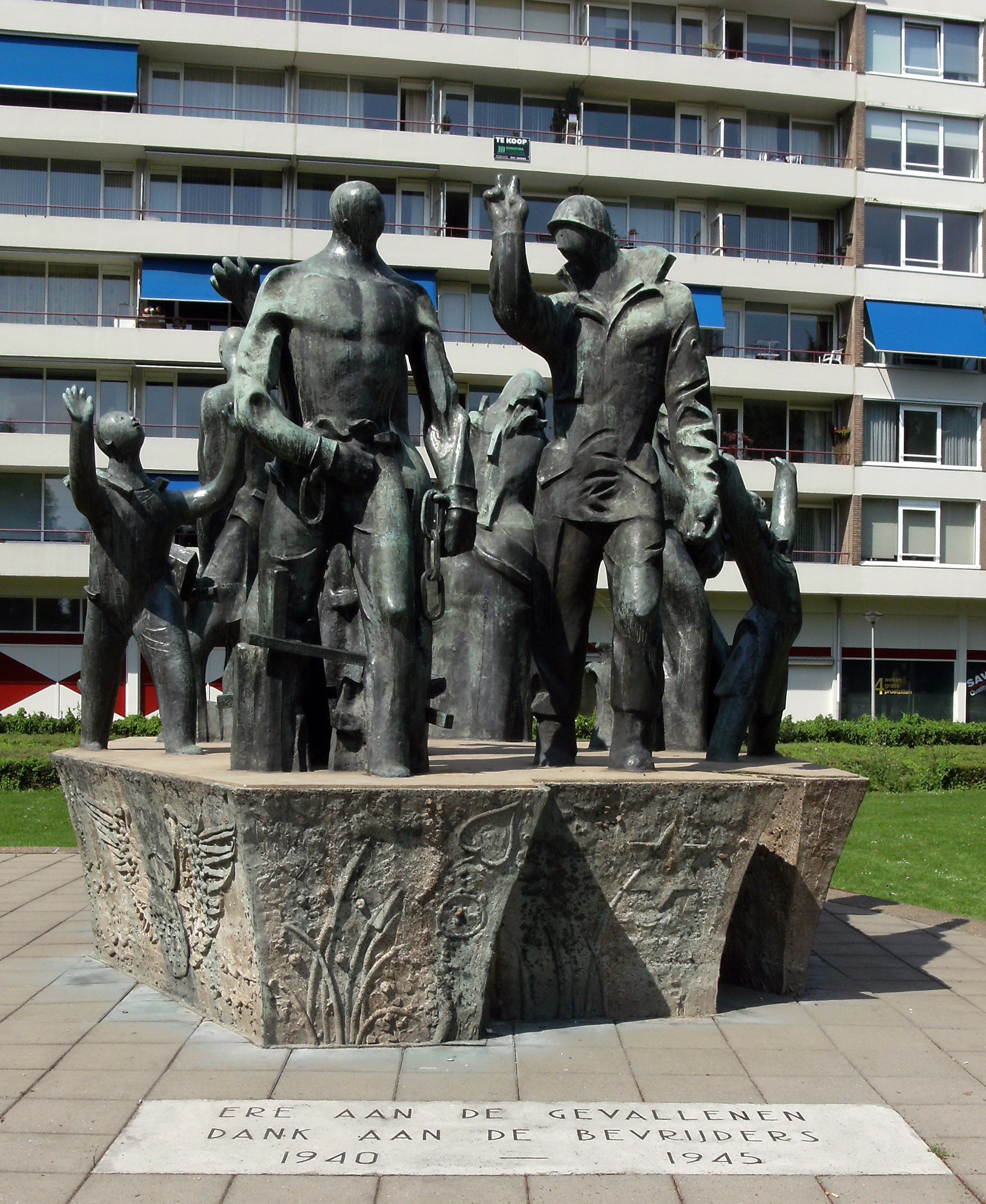
Limburgs bevrijdingsmonument on the Koningsplein in Maastricht

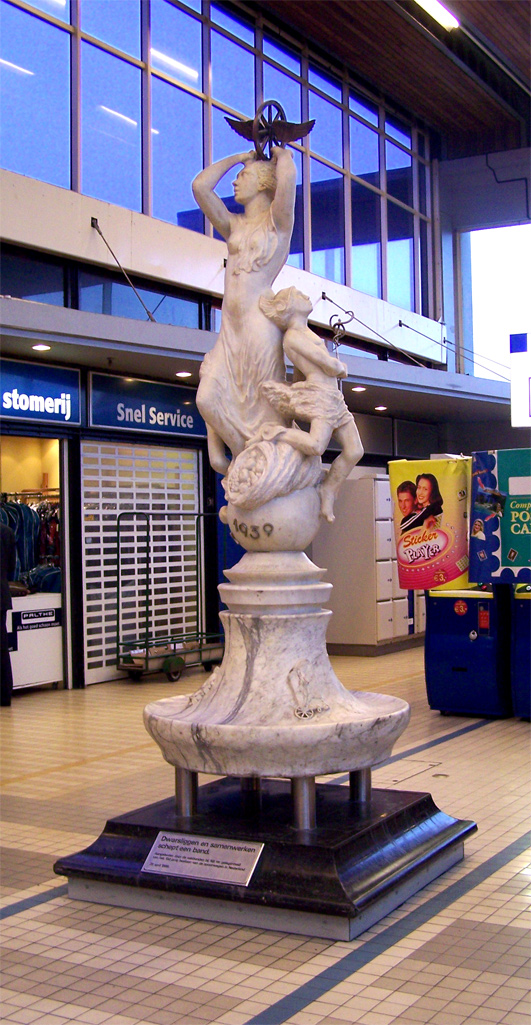
Sculpture Het Verkeer in the station hall of Utrecht Centraal. The statue was unveiled in 1939 but only placed in 1940. It was a gift from the Personeelraad to the management of the NS in honor of the centenary of the NS

Charles Eyck was born in 1897 in Meerssen. He received his training at the Rijksacademie in Amsterdam. He had previously started as a pottery painter at the ceramics factory Céramique in Maastricht. In 1922, he won the Prix de Rome. After short stays in Sweden, Curaçao, southern France, Amsterdam, Clamart and Utrecht, he settled in Schimmert.

Initially, his work was expressionistic in style. He was later criticized for persisting in a more or less consistent religious style. Partly because of these criticisms and his increasing deafness, he lived more and more in seclusion in the house "Ravensbos" in Schimmert, which he designed himself.

After the unveiling of the Bevrijdingsraam in the Sint Janskerk in Gouda (1947), Eyck was presented with the decoration of a Knight in the Order of Orange-Nassau. He returned the award almost twenty years later, because he could not agree with a marriage between Princess Beatrix and the German Claus.

Charles Eyck died at the age of 86.

== Works ==
- Begraafplaats van Aubel (1920), funerary chapel in Meerssen
- Fresco (1937) in the refectory of the Klooster Mariënhage in Eindhoven
- Het Verkeer (1939), design, in the context of 100 years of Dutch railways, executed by Jo Uiterwaal, Utrecht
- Polyptiek (1941) in the Onze Lieve Vrouw van Goede Raadkerk in Beverwijk
- Windows (1945) of the city hall of Uithuizermeeden
- Stations of the Cross (1946) in the Sint-Franciscuskerk in Groningen
- Bevrijdingsraam (1947) in the Sint Janskerk of Gouda
- The official investiture painting (1948) of Queen Juliana
- Stained glass windows (1948/1950) in the Sint-Catharinakerk in Eindhoven
- Limburgs bevrijdingsmonument (1952) on the Koningsplein in Maastricht
- Wall painting (1953) in the officers' mess of the R.K. Zeemanshuis in Willemstad, Curaçao
- Tile panel (1954) of Elizabeth of Hungary on the back facade of the former Sint-Elisabeth Hospital in Willemstad, Curaçao
- Uniforms (1957) Schuttersgezelschap Sint Sebastiaan Schimmert
- Paintings and stained glass windows (1958) for the Jozef Arbeiderkerk in Meerssen
- Wall paintings (1962) in the church of Jeantes (Picardy)
- Altar wall and Stations of the Cross in Zeist
- Windows in the Roman Catholic HBS in Heerlen
- 24 stained glass windows in the Sint Jozef kerk of Achterveld
- Stained glass windows in the Sint Martinuskerk in Venlo
- Stations of the Cross in Enschede, in the Koepelkerk in Maastricht and in Schijndel
- Stations of the Cross in Sint-Jan de Doperkerk in Waalwijk (1940–1943): due to Van Eyck's refusal to join the Kultuurkamer established by the German occupier, 3 of the 14 stations are not polychromed but still in the original terracotta colour
- Stations of the Cross in de Sint-Martinuskerk in Genk
- The painting of the vault and the apse in the St. Hubertuskerk in Genhout (municipality of Beek)
- Paintings in the Onze Lieve Vrouwe Kerk in Helmond, assisted by Daan Wildschut and Ries Mulder
- Paintings in the house at the Warandelaan in Helmond
- Church painting in the church of the Redemptoristenklooster in Wittem
- Church painting in the Sint-Barbarakerk in Bunnik
- Stained glass window in the former Chamber of Commerce of Venlo
- Illustrations for Karel en Elegast, by Jef Spuisers
- Stained glass windows in the Sint-Gerardus Majellakerk in Nederweert-Eind
- Apse of the Sint-Gerardus Majellakerk in Heksenberg-Heerlen
- Stained glass window in the former town hall of Hoensbroek
- Wall painting in the H. Andreas en Antoniuskerk in Oostelbeers
