= Hogere Burgerschool =

Defunct Dutch secondary school type

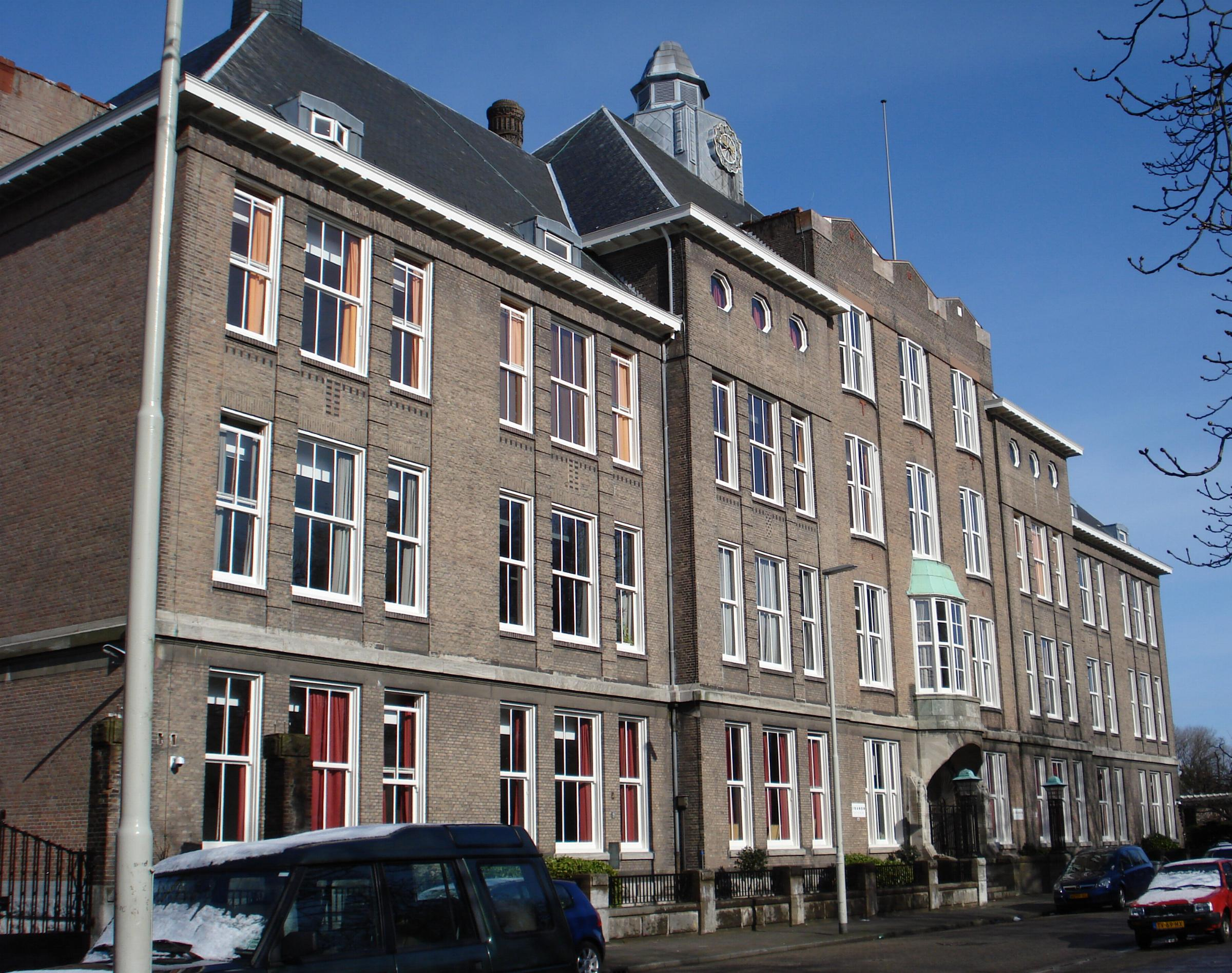
A former HBS for girls in Rotterdam

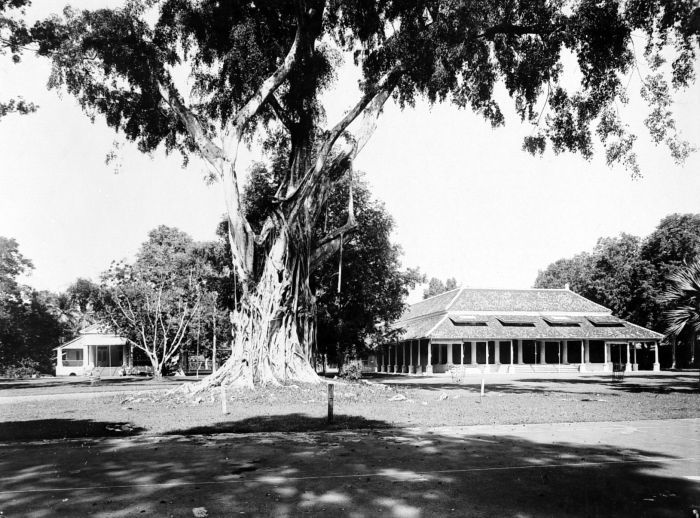
The King William III HBS in Batavia (now Jakarta) in 1910–1932

The Hogere Burgerschool (HBS; lit. 'Higher Civic School') was a secondary school type that existed between 1863 and 1974 in the Netherlands and the Dutch Empire. These schools, with a five- or sometimes six-year program, continued in 1968 as VWO. The last HBS diplomas were given out in 1974.

== History ==
The HBS is a mid-19th-century creation by the liberal politician Johan Rudolph Thorbecke, and resulted from the law on secondary education enacted in May 1863. Along with the creation of burgerscholen in each city of more than 10,000 inhabitants, the HBS was intended as a practically oriented education for higher functions in industry and trade. It was explicitly not intended as a sufficient education to enter university. According to historian Hans Verhage the form "hogere-burgerschool" (the hyphen indicating that hogere, "higher", modifies burger, "citizen") is linguistically correct, since it was a schooling system geared toward higher-ranked citizens, and not a higher school for all citizens.

The law called for at least fifteen such (non-denominational) schools; where those would be placed soon became a matter of contention. The most famous of controversies (the H.B.S. kwestie) concerned the province of Limburg, which had only been part of the Netherlands since 1839. Maastricht, Limburg's capital, was the only city with more than 10,000 citizens, but the city refused since it preferred having a municipal rather than a government-run school, which allowed it control over the hiring and firing of teachers. Thorbecke, however, wanted a HBS in Limburg, since that would also strengthen the bonds between the (new) province and the central government: the HBS was to train the new national elite, and could thus aid in nation building. When Maastricht turned the HBS down, Roermond was proposed, where the local clergy feared that a HBS would damage enrollment at the local Catholic college, and the city council hastened to adjudicate the intended buildings to that college. A private letter from Thorbecke demanding the buildings be offered to the HBS was made public, leading to public outcry: at its heart, the conflict touched the special status of denominational education, and an additional source of anger was the government's raising of taxes in the province to bring it in line with taxes in other provinces. The HBS was founded in Roermond in 1864; the following year, Jan Augustus Paredis, bishop of Roermond, published an edict condemning "mixed" schools.

Part of the innovative character of the HBS was that it offered a higher level of education without training in the classical languages (Latin and Greek). Graduating from the HBS did not officially grant access to the university system until 1917, and universities still required a "gymnasium" preparatory training for the humanities; still, the HBS facilitated access to universities in sciences and technology, even if illegally—universities had in fact accepted HBS grads with additional examinations. It was an "illegitimate but tolerated type of pre-university education". In 1917, HBS grads were formally given access to medicine, mathematics and physics programmes at universities. This was complemented by economics, Indology and geography in 1937, and psychology in 1949.

== In the Dutch East Indies ==
The Dutch East Indies had a number of HBS institutions. There was one in Batavia (founded in 1864, named for William III of the Netherlands), one in Semarang, and one in Surabaya; the latter is where the later Indonesian president Sukarno received his education and his introduction to Marxism.
