= National Gallery of Indonesia =

Art museum in Jakarta, Indonesia

- Galeri Nasional Indonesia
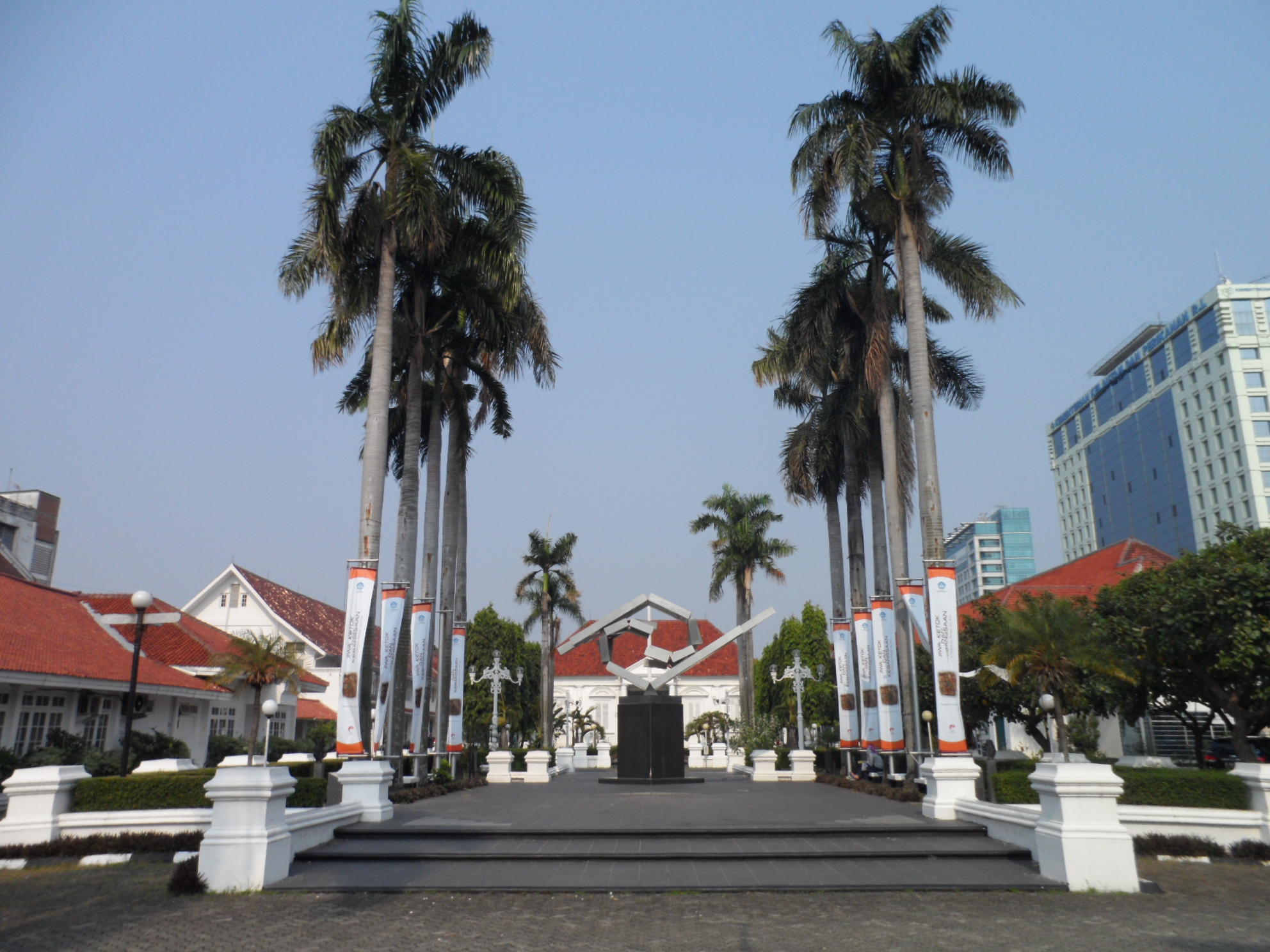

- Location within Jakarta
- Established: 8 May 1999
- Location: Jl. Medan Merdeka Timur 14, 10110, Indonesia
- Coordinates: 6.178529°S 106.833276°E
- Collection size: A collection of 1770 fine arts
- Director: Tubagus Andre Sukmana (2005–present)
- Curators: M. Agus Burhan, Inda C. Noerhadi, Rizki A. Zaelani, Kuss Indarto
- Owner: Ministry of Culture (Indonesian Heritage Agency)
- Public transit access: Gondangdia; Gambir; Gambir 2
- Website: www.galeri-nasional.or.id

The National Gallery of Indonesia is an art gallery and museum in Jakarta, Indonesia. The National Gallery of Indonesia has existed as a cultural institution in the field of visual arts since 8 May 1999. The institution plays an important role in expanding public's awareness of artworks through preservation, development and exploitation of the visual arts in Indonesia.

== History ==
=== Educational complex ===
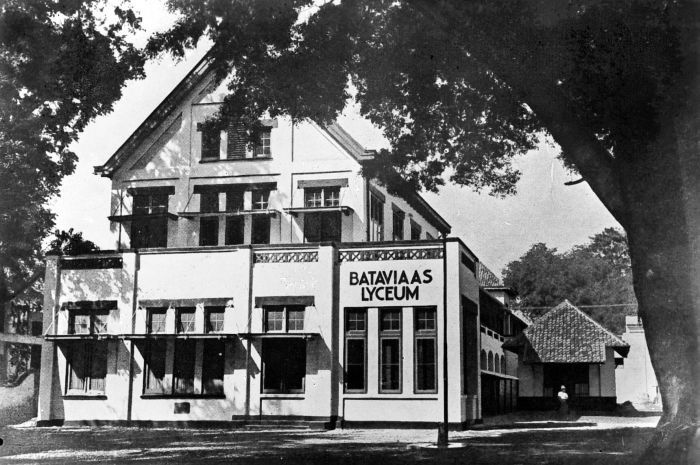
Lyceum of the CAS, now Gedung B of the National Gallery of Indonesia.

The original address of the complex was Koningsplein Oost No. 14, Batavia. The main building (Gedung A) was built in 1817 by G.C. Van Rijk as an Indische Woonhuis (Indies residence) in a Dutch Indies colonial style. The materials for the construction were taken from the remains of Kasteel Batavia.

In 1900, the complex was converted into an HBS educational institution known as Carpentier Alting Stichting (CAS) under the authority of the Dutch Protestant pastor and prominent Freemason Albertus Samuel Carpentier Alting (1837–1915). The former Indies residence (Gedung A) was converted into a female dormitory building, while several buildings were added to improve the facility of the school: a lyceum or primary school (1902, now Gedung B of the National Gallery); a MULO or junior high school; and a HBS or senior high school.

After independence in 1945, the CAS remained operational to serve Djakarta's large remaining white settler community, although the Indonesian government forced the school to admit students from all races.

In 1955, the Indonesian government banned all activities related to the Dutch colonial administration. The educational institution was placed under the authority of Raden Saleh Foundation, which continued the activities of CAS and remained under the auspices of the Freemasonry.

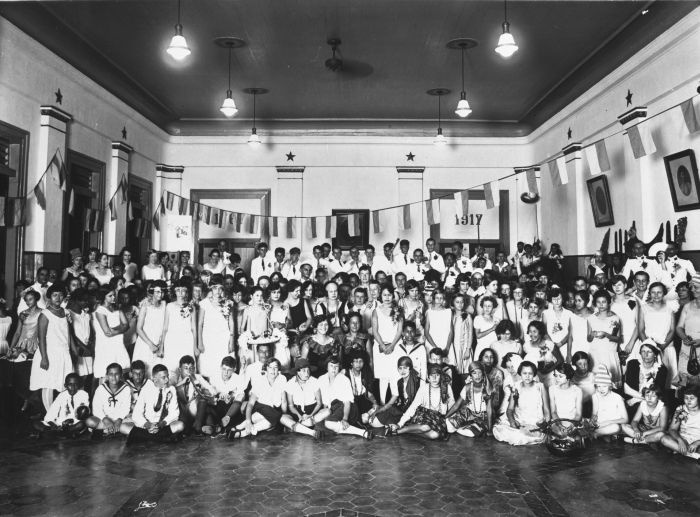
Students of the CAS.

In 1961, all Dutch students and teachers of CAS were expelled by the Indonesian government and the school was abolished and its premises turned into SDN 01 (State Primary School No. 1) and Sekolah Menengah Atas 7, "Senior High School 7" In 1962, the military authorities issued a Decision Letter signed by President Sukarno which banned Freemasonry in Indonesia. As a result, the Raden Saleh Foundation was disbanded, and the school was taken over by the Department of Education and Culture of the Republic of Indonesia.

After the 30 September Movement in 1965, the main building was used as the headquarters of the Youth and Student Command Unit (Komando Kesatuan Pemuda dan Pelajar Indonesia or KAPPI) that held demonstrations demanding the disbanding of the Indonesian Communist Party.

Once the security situation improved, the building was used by the Indonesian Army (Tentara Nasional Indonesia Angkatan Darat or TNI/AD) as Headquarters for the Jayasakti Infantry Brigade under the auspices of the Jakarta Raya V Military Command (Komando Daerah Militer V Jakarta Raya: Kodam Jaya).

In 1981, based on a telegram from the Army Chief of Staff (Kepala Staf Angkatan Darat or KSAD) marked No. 51/1978/1981, and reconfirmed with Jakarta Raya V Military Command Decision Letter No. SKIP/194/1982, the core building was returned to the Department of Education and Culture. Then, based on the Department of Education and Culture Secretary General Decision Letter No. 126/F/1982, dated 28 February 1982, the management of the structure was transferred to the Directorate General of Culture. The core building (Building A) has since been used as an Exhibition Building and is now the central structure of Indonesia National Gallery.

=== Establishment of the National Gallery of Indonesia ===
The founding of Indonesia National Gallery was done among the efforts carried out to establish National Cultural Development Center Program (Wisma Seni Nasional/Pusat Pengembangan Kebudayaan Nasional) begun in the 1960s.

While waiting for the realization of the National Cultural Development Center Program, Prof. Dr. Fuad Hasan (at the time the Minister of Education and Culture) organized the renovation of the building to perfect its function as an art exhibition center and as a center for art appreciation activities. The renovated building was dedicated in 1987.

After intensive lobbying with the concerned authorities from 1995, the institution known as Indonesia National Gallery took on its existing form and function based on previous documents. The first, issued in 1998, was the Coordinating Minister for Development and Empowerment of the Civil Service (Menko Pengawasan Pembangunan dan Pendayagunaan Aparatur Negara) Decision Letter No. 34?MK/.WASPAN/1998. This was then confirmed by Department of Education and Culture Decision Letter No. 099a/0/1998, and the building was dedicated on 8 May 1999.

The initial structure of Indonesia National Gallery (Department of Education and Culture Decision Letter No. 099a/0/1998) has been changed several times as reflected in the document BP BUDPAR No. Kep.07/BPBUDPAR/2002, which was then brought into line with the policies of the Ministry of Culture and Tourism. This final organizational shift was due to the administrative change of the Ministry of Culture and Tourism in the Department of Culture and Tourism under the documents km.55/OT.001/MPK/2003 and, more recently, Minister of Culture and Tourism Decision Letter No. PM.41/OT.002/MPK – 2006.

== Collection ==
Today the museum houses 1770 artworks by Indonesian and foreign artists, among the most notable are Indonesian artists Raden Saleh, Affandi, Basuki Abdullah, and also some foreign artists such as Wassily Kandinsky, Hans Hartung, Victor Vasarely, Sonia Delaunay, Pierre Soulages, and Zao Wou Ki.

== See also ==
- List of colonial buildings and structures in Jakarta
- List of museums and cultural institutions in Indonesia
- List of national galleries
