= Mochtar Apin =

Indonesian painter and tenured lecturer (1923–1994)

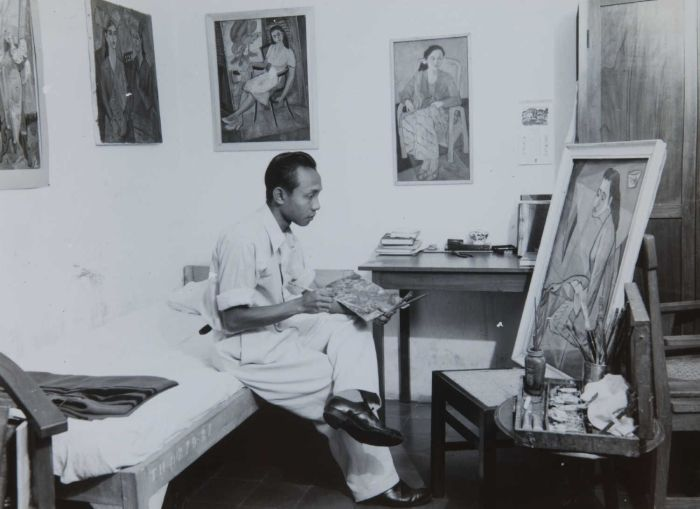
- Born: 23 December 1923; Padangpanjang, Dutch East Indies
- Died: 1 January 1994 (aged 70); Bandung, Indonesia
- Education: Fine Arts ITB, Bandung, Indonesia (1951); Fine Arts and Design, Amsterdam, Netherlands (1952); École Nationale Supérieure des Beaux-Arts, Paris, France (1957); Deutsche Akademie der Kuenste, Berlin, Germany
- Occupations: Painter, Lecturer
- Spouse: Sien Mochtar Apin
- Children: Karina, Arleti and Marella Mochtar Apin

Mochtar Apin (23 December 1923 – 1 January 1994) was an accomplished Indonesian painter, illustrator, writer and tenured lecturer who taught fine arts at the Bandung Institute of Technology, ITB.

He was co-founder of the Arena of Independent Artists movement (Gelanggang Seniman Muda) in Jakarta in 1946, and a member of the Bandung Institute of Technology. Alongside other painters, intellectuals and poets, he advocated a universalist ideal for culture, advocating the creation of art concerns that could communicate to people of all backgrounds.

== Life ==
In 1948, Apin enrolled at the Technical Faculty, Universitas Indonesia (renamed as Institut Teknologi Bandung (ITB) in 1959) where he became a student of Ries Mulder, one of the founders of the school. In 1951 he visitied The Netherlands on a scholarship to study at the Kunstnijverheidsschool Quellinus. Later in 1953 he enrolled at the École Nationale Supérieure des Beaux-Arts, the Fine Arts School in Paris. During these years, Mochtar took the initiative travelling around Europe, looking at art and visiting museums. Apin was a great admirer of the optical art of Victor Vasarely, having lived for several years in France. His geometric paintings from this period are related to the graphic work of Vasarely. With these experiences, Mochtar was well equipped to debate on the role of art in Indonesia. Mochtar returned to Bandung in 1958 and joined the teaching staff of his former faculty one year prior to the departure of Ries Mulder. His last retrospective in 1988 was held in Bandung and Jakarta, four years after he received tenure as professor at the ITB.

In 1960, Mochtar married Sien Mochtar Apin, and the couple had three daughters, Karina, Arleti and Marella Mochtar Apin.

== Works and exhibitions ==
=== Solo exhibitions ===
- Amsterdam and Den Haag in 1953
- Solo Exhibition in Paris in 1956
- Solo Exhibition Bangkok, 1968, 1969 and 1971
- Solo Exhibition in Jakarta, Dewan Kesenian Jakarta in 1976
- Solo Exhibition "Retrospektif 1940–1988" in Bandung in 1986, Jakarta in 1989 and Yogyakarta in 1990
- Exhibition of Bandung Artists, 21–28 December 1986
- "Mochtar Apin: Expressions on Paper – 1940s – 1950s" Private works of the family archive. Singapore, Gajah Gallery, 8 April 2005.
- "Archiving Apin". Works and Documents from the Mochtar Apin Collection. Jakarta, Galeri Soemardja, 29 September - 4 October 2013

=== Group exhibitions ===
- "Exhibition of local Painters in Bandung". 21 - 28 December 1986, West Jawa, Indonesia
- Remembering the Pioneers of Indonesian Fine Arts, Aula Institut Teknologi Bandung, 16-23 Dec 1995
- "Cubism in Asia: Unbounded Dialogues", organized by the Japan Foundation in Tokyo, Seoul and Singapore, August 2005 to April 2006

== Awards ==
- Scholarship from the Indonesian government to study at the cole Nationale Supérieure des Beaux-Arts, Paris, France (1953–1957)
- Scholarship from Deutsche Akademie der Künste, Berlin, West Germany (1957–1958)
- Scholarship from France to study lithography/offset/ printmaking techniques in Paris (1968)
- Cultural Award from the Australian government (1974)

== Related Indonesian artists ==
- Abdul Djalil Pirous
- Ahmad Sadali
- I Nyoman Masriadi
- Ries Mulder
- Umi Dachlan
