= Edi Sedyawati =

Indonesian archeologist and historian

Edi Sudjahri
- Born: 28 October 1938; Malang, The Netherlands
- Died: 12 November 2022 (aged 84); Jakarta, Indonesia

Edi Sedyawati binti Iman Sudjahri (28 October 1938 - 12 November 2022) was an Indonesian archeologist and historian. She was a professor of archeology at the University of Indonesia, Chairperson of the university's Department of Javanese Letters and Center for Humanities and Social Sciences and also Chair of the Department of Dance at the Jakarta Institute for Arts. She also served as Indonesia's Director General of Culture in the Ministry of Education and Culture from 1993 to 1999.

Sedyawati studied various forms of Indonesian dance in Ikatan Seni Tari Indonesia, and in 1961 she performed in the Indonesian culture mission to China, North Korea, North Vietnam, and the Soviet Union. Although the primary purpose of the culture mission was soft diplomacy to Indonesia's allies, in 2006, Sedyawati wrote in a reflection that the performers primarily benefitted by networking with Indonesians from diverse cultural backgrounds and learning about the various styles of dance and performance art in the archipelago.

In 1960, Sedyawati's work on dating carved statues near Karawang contributed toward proving that the ancient Tarumanagara kingdom embraced Hinduism.
