= Indonesian Heritage Series =

The Indonesian Heritage Series is a series of encyclopedia volumes published by Archipelago Press, which is an imprint of Editions Didier Millet Pte Ltd of Singapore. It was initiated by Yayasan Dana Bakti. The series is edited by academics with significant expertise in their fields in relation to Indonesia.

== Volumes and Editors ==
- 1: Ancient History - John Miksic
- 2 The Human Environment - Jonathan Rigg
- 3 Early Modern History - Anthony Reid
- 4 Plants - Tony and Jane Whitten
- 5 Wildlife - Tony and Jane Whitten
- 6 Architecture - Gunawan Tjahjono
- 7 Visual Art - Hilda Soemantri
- 8 Performing Arts - Edi Sedyawati
- 9 Religion and Ritual - James Fox
- 10 Language and Literature - John H. McGlynn

=== Projected titles ===
- 11 Contemporary History - Taufik Abdullah
- 12 Textiles and Adornment - Robyn Maxwell
- 13 Seas - editor to be announced
- 14 The Economy - editor to be announced
- 15 Volcanoes - editor to be announced

== Organisation ==
The overall series has an Editorial Advisory Board with Haryati Soebadio as the Chairman. There is also a Series Publishing Team.

Each volume in the series has the main Volume Editor - and an editorial team. Each volume has 50 separate articles or more. Each article in the volume has an author who is acknowledged in the contents and title page. Every article is confined to a two-page entry which includes maps, diagrams, photos and illustrations.
