= Srihadi Soedarsono =

Indonesian painter (1931–2022)

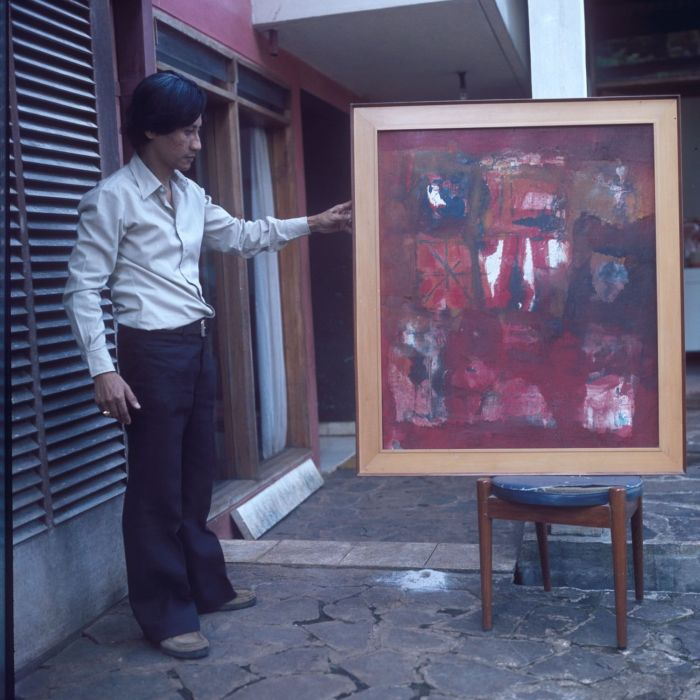
- Born: 12 April 1931; Surakarta, Dutch East Indies
- Died: 26 February 2022 (aged 90)
- Education: Seni Rupa ITB (1964); Rochester Institute of Technology, NY, US (1969)
- Occupations: Painter, Lecturer
- Known for: Paintings of Indonesian Cultural Life
- Spouse: Farida Srihadi
- Children: 3

Kanjeng Raden Haryo Tumenggung H. Srihadi Soedarsono Adhikoesoemo (4 December 1931 – 26 February 2022) was an Indonesian painter and tenured lecturer. He married Farida Srihadi, who is also an accomplished painter that studied at the Bandung Institute of Technology (ITB), as well as abroad in the Netherlands and England.

== Life and career ==
Soedarsono was appointed a member of the Student Army from 1945 to 1948 as a painter journalist who created posters for the Information Center Division IV BKR/TKR/TNI in Solo. His military career ended in 1948 when he was rationalized with the rank of sergeant major and returned to school at SMA II Surakarta.

Between 1947 and 1952, Soedarsono joined the Young Indonesian Artists in Solo and Yogyakarta. He also was an active member in the formation of the Surakarta Cultural Association in Solo since its inception in 1950. Srihadi actively participated in art exhibitions in Solo and Yogyakarta.

In 1952 he began to enter art education at the Painters Education Center, Faculty of Engineering at the University of Indonesia Bandung (now the Faculty of Fine Arts, Bandung Institute of Technology), with the Dutch cubist painter Ries Mulder as his teacher. In 1955, he created the Fine Arts Student Family (KMSR) logo for the Faculty. The logo is in the form of a palette with the words "ART RUPA BANDUNG" with the symbol of the University of Indonesia.

He graduated as a fine arts graduate and graduated on Saturday, 28 February 1959, just two days before the Bandung Institute of Technology was inaugurated (Monday, 2 March 1959). In 1960 Srihadi received a scholarship from ICA to study in the US to continue his studies at Ohio State University until he received his master of art degree in 1962. Despite all his international travels, Srihadi painted often traditional Javanese cultural topics, including dancer and the Borobudur temple, as well as landscapes. Even so, he painted abstract, he represents traditional, rather than the Westernized painting styles of several of his colleagues.

Soedarsono was married to Dra Siti Farida Nawawi. They had two daughters and one son, named Tara Farina, MSc, Rati Farini, SH, LLM, and Tri Krisnamurti Syailendra.

On 1 May 1969, he was appointed a civil servant. His appointment was on 1 December 1992 as a professor of Fine Arts, from which he retired on January 1, 2007.

Apart from being a painter, he also taught as a lecturer at the Bandung Institute of Technology and the Jakarta Art Institute.

He died on 26 February 2022, at the age of 90.

== Works ==
Srihadi Soedarsono's work has a long and continuous process. Early work was strongly influenced by educational outcomes, namely synthetic geometry. In the 1960s, he began to experiment with abstract forms through paper cut patches and color spontaneity. Entering the 1970s, he tended to be impressionist through watercolor and expressionist through oil paint and often included symbolic elements in his paintings.

Finally, his work appears in a simplified form with a strong horizon line, as well as paintings of poetic figures inspired by Zen teachings.

The works of Srihadi are shown in numerous public collections:

- National Museum of Indonesia, Jakarta
- National Gallery of Indonesia, with a Solo exhibition in 2020
- State Palace Collection, Jakarta, Indonesia
- The United Nations, New York, USA
- Museum of Modern art, Rio de Janeiro, Brazil
- Asia and Pacific Museum, Warsaw, Poland
- Ohio State University, OH, USA
- Fordham University, New York, USA
- Neka Museum, Bali, Indonesia

== Awards ==
As a dedicated and senior painter, Srihadi received many awards, including:

- National Award for Contemporary Art from the Government of the Republic of Indonesia, 1971
- Cultural Award from the Australian Government, 1973
- The Netherlands Governmental Cultural Grant, 1977
- The best prize at the Biennale Jakarta III Indonesian Painting, 1978
- Fulbright Grant from the United States Government, 1979
- Seoul International Art Competitor's Award
- Satalyana Kearya Satya Award for Cultural Achievements of the Republic of Indonesia, 1989 and 1996
- The Japan Foundation Cultural Grant, 1990

== Bibliography ==
=== Literature ===
- Jean Couteau. "Srihadi Soedarsono: The Path of the Soul" Lontar Foundation (2003, Jakarta, Indonesia), 208 Pages. ISBN 978-9798083471
- Suwarno Wisetrotomo and Farida Srihadi, "Srihadi: Poetry Without Words: A Collection of Paintings by Srihadi Soedarsono" (2003), ISBN 979-95312-6-8
- Farida Srihadi, Rikrik Kusmara and Srihadi Soedarsono. "SRIHADI SOEDARSONO: 70 Year Journey of Roso" (2016), 320 Pages, English and Bahasa Indonesia. ISBN 978-9799109941
- Jean Couteau and Farida Srihadi: "Srihadi Soedarsono – Man x Universe". English and Bahasa Indonesia (2020, Afterhours Books). ISBN 9786026990532

=== Internet ===
- YouTube: Paintings and Biography of Srihadi Soedarsono (in Indonesian Language). Heno Airlangga, 01.Dec.2020
