= Indologie =

Indologie or Indonesiëkunde in the Netherlands was the study of history, literature and philosophy of Indonesia. The study prepared Dutchmen for colonial civil service in the Netherlands Indies. It was taught in Delft and Utrecht.

Nowadays, Indologie refers to the study of the history, languages, religions of the entire South-East Asian region. It is taught at the University of Leiden in the Netherlands.
