= 961 =

Calendar year

961 in various calendars
Gregorian calendar	961; CMLXI
Ab urbe condita	1714
Armenian calendar	410; ԹՎ ՆԺ
Assyrian calendar	5711
Balinese saka calendar	882–883
Bengali calendar	367–368
Berber calendar	1911
Buddhist calendar	1505
Burmese calendar	323
Byzantine calendar	6469–6470
Chinese calendar	庚申年 (Metal Monkey); 3658 or 3451 — to — 辛酉年 (Metal Rooster); 3659 or 3452
Coptic calendar	677–678
Discordian calendar	2127
Ethiopian calendar	953–954
Hebrew calendar	4721–4722
- Hindu calendars
Vikram Samvat	1017–1018
Shaka Samvat	882–883
Kali Yuga	4061–4062
Holocene calendar	10961
Iranian calendar	339–340
Islamic calendar	349–350
Japanese calendar	Tentoku 5 / Ōwa 1 (応和元年)
Javanese calendar	861–862
Julian calendar	961; CMLXI
Korean calendar	3294
Minguo calendar	951 before ROC 民前951年
Nanakshahi calendar	−507
Seleucid era	1272/1273 AG
Thai solar calendar	1503–1504
Tibetan calendar	ལྕགས་ཕོ་སྤྲེ་ལོ་ (male Iron-Monkey); 1087 or 706 or −66 — to — ལྕགས་མོ་བྱ་ལོ་ (female Iron-Bird); 1088 or 707 or −65

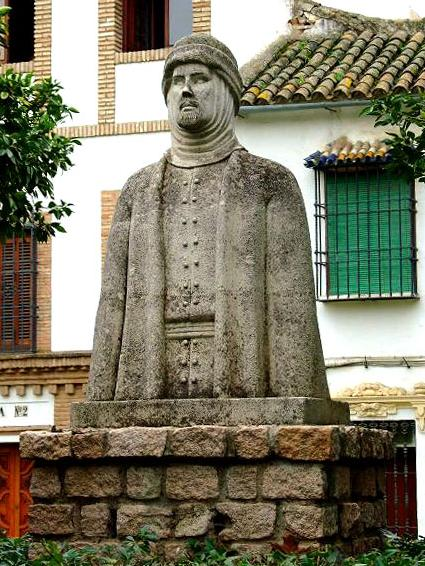
Statue of Caliph Al-Hakam II (915–976)

Year 961 (CMLXI) was a common year starting on Tuesday of the Julian calendar.

== Events ==
=== By place ===
==== Byzantine Empire ====
- March 6 – Siege of Chandax: Byzantine forces under Nikephoros II Phokas capture and pillage Chandax after an 8-month siege. Nikephoros massacres the population without mercy and carries them off into slavery, returning to Constantinople with Emir Abd al-Aziz ibn Shu'ayb and his family as prisoners. The island Emirate of Crete is converted into a Byzantine theme and the remaining Muslims are converted to Christianity.

==== Europe ====
- May 26 – Otto I, Holy Roman Emperor elects his 6-year-old son Otto II as heir apparent and co-ruler at the Imperial Diet in Worms. He is crowned at Aachen, and placed under the tutelage of his grandmother Matilda and his half-brother William of Mainz. Otto's own brother Bruno I is charged with the provisional government of Lorraine again.
- Summer – Otto I leads an expeditionary force into northern Italy through the Brenner Pass at Trento, to assist the beleaguered young Pope John XII. He proceeds towards Pavia – King Berengar II sends his son and co-ruler Adalbert II from Rome at the head of a large army to seize control of the Upper Adige and contest Otto's entry.
- October 15 – Caliph Abd-al-Rahman III dies after a 32-year reign. He is succeeded by his son Al-Hakam II as ruler of the Caliphate of Córdoba in Al-Andalus (modern Spain).
- Battle of Fitjar – A Viking force under the sons of Eric Bloodaxe lands on Hordaland. King Haakon the Good defeats the rebelling force, but is killed. Harald Greycloak becomes ruler of the western part of Norway.
- The Lombard army under Adalbert II refuses to fight Otto I unless Berengar II abdicates in favor of Adalbert. Berengar refuses, and the armies retreat to their strongholds. Berengar and his family take whatever loyal soldiers remain and disperse themselves – Berengar retreats to the fortress at Montefeltro (in the Pentapolis).

==== Armenia ====
- King Ashot III of Armenia (the Merciful) moves his capital from Kars eastward to Ani (modern Turkey). Located on a major east-west caravan route, Ani will become larger than any European city, with a population of about 100,000 that will rival Baghdad, Cairo, and Constantinople. Ani also becomes the site of the royal mausoleum of the Bagratuni kings.

=== By topic ===
==== Art ====
- The "Shroud of Saint Josse", a rich silk Samite camel cloth from Khurasan, is made. It is preserved in the Abbey of Saint-Josse-sur-Mer, near Caen (Normandy) (approximate date).

==== Religion ====
- The Tiger Hill Pagoda (or Huqui Tower) is built in the city of Suzhou, located in Jiangsu Province (Eastern China).
- Tavistock Abbey is founded by Ordgar, Ealdorman of Devon, in England.

== Births ==
- January 15 – Seongjong, ruler of Goryeo (Korea) (d. 997)
- Al-Tha'alibi, Persian historian and writer (d. 1038)
- Arnulf II, Count of Flanders (the Younger), Frankish nobleman (or 960)
- Edith of Wilton, English princess and nun (approximate date)
- Fujiwara no Michikane, Japanese nobleman (d. 995)
- Kou Zhun, Chinese Grand chancellor (approximate date)
- Mahendradatta, queen of Bali (Indonesia) (d. 1011)
- Pietro II Orseolo, Doge of Venice (d. 1009)
- Ramiro III, king of León (Spain) (d. 985)
- Sigmundur Brestisson, Viking chieftain (d. 1005)

== Deaths ==
- July 17 – Du, empress dowager of the Song dynasty
- August 12 – Li Jing, emperor of Southern Tang (b. 916)
- September 19 – Helena Lekapene, Byzantine empress
- October 1 – Artald, archbishop of Reims
- October 15 – Abd al-Rahman III, caliph of Córdoba
- Abd al-Malik I, Samanid emir (b. 944)
- Abu'l-Qasim Unujur ibn al-Ikhshid, Ikhshidid ruler
- Adarnase V, prince of Tao-Klarjeti (Georgia)
- Atto of Vercelli, Lombard bishop (b. 885)
- Ava of Cerdanya, countess regent of Cerdanya and Besalú
- Butuga II, ruler of the Western Ganga Dynasty (India)
- Fujiwara no Masatada, Japanese poet
- Haakon the Good, king of Norway
- Landulf II of Benevento (the Red), Lombard prince
- Li Tao, Chinese chancellor (approximate date)
- Minamoto no Tsunemoto, Japanese samurai (b. 894)
- Raymond II of Rouergue, Frankish nobleman (approximate date)
- William II, Marquess of Montferrat, Frankish nobleman (approximate date)
