= Islamic art =

Visual art in Islamic cultures

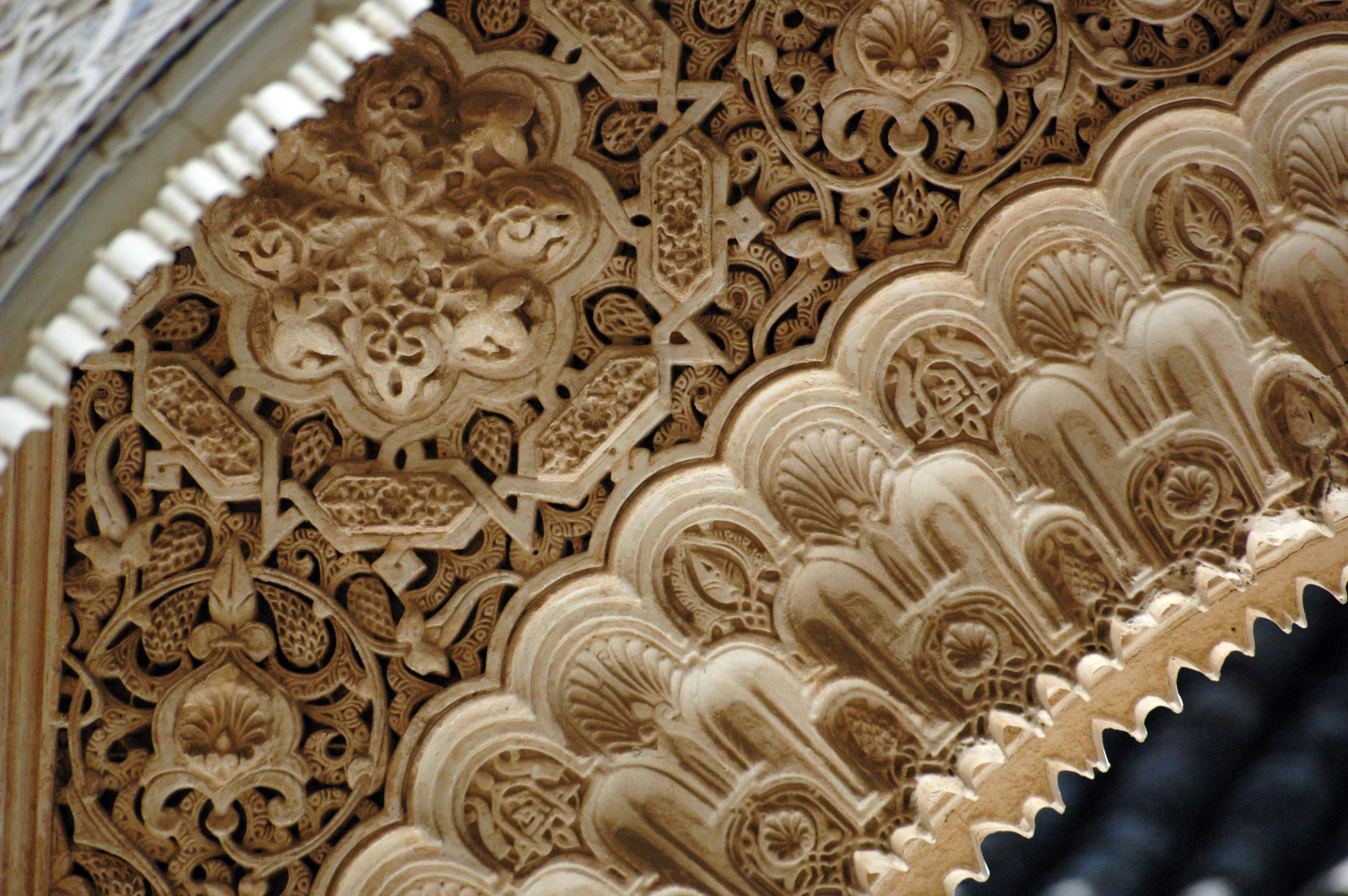
Detail of arabesque decoration at the Alhambra in Spain

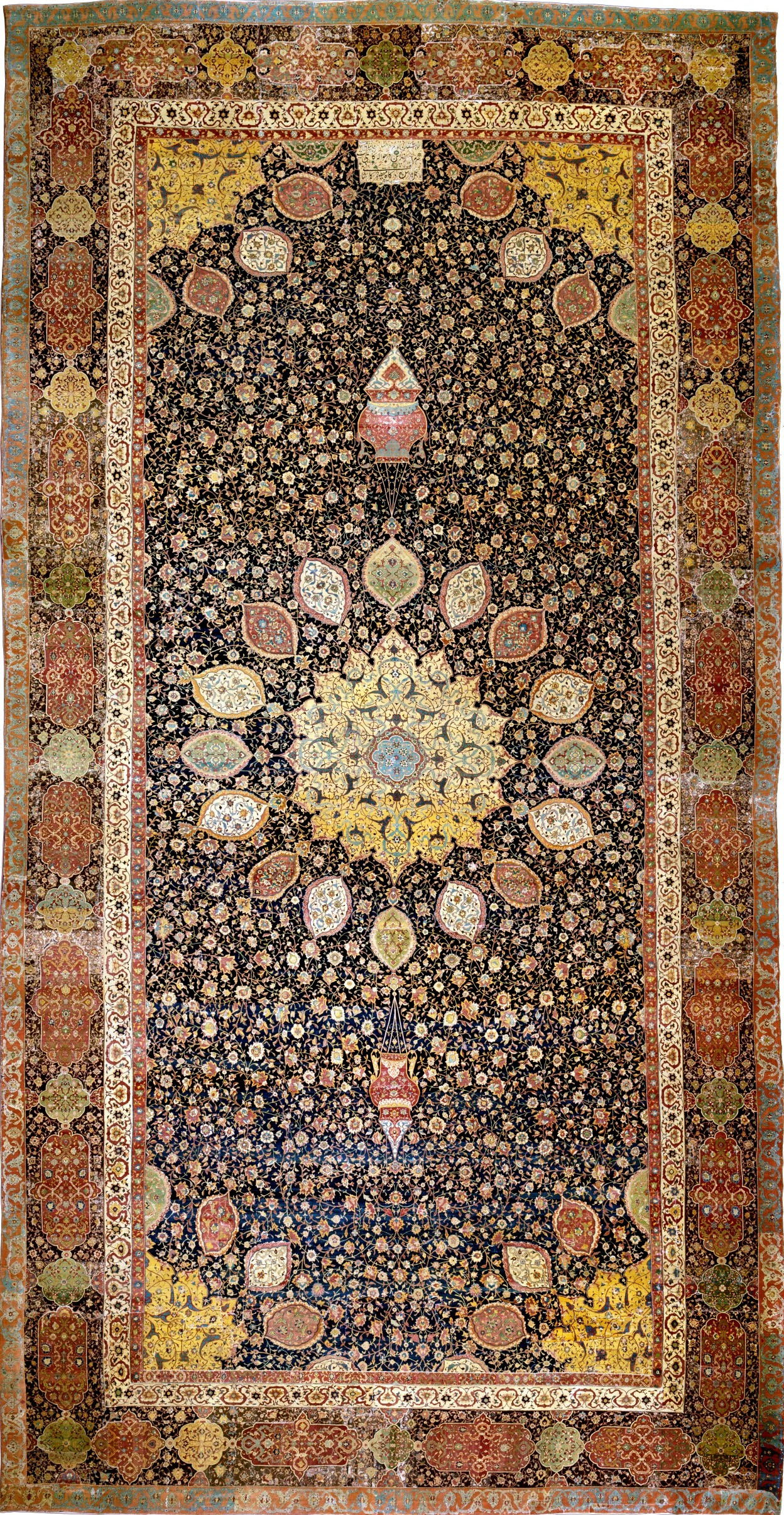
The Ardabil Carpet, probably the finest surviving Persian carpet, Tabriz, mid-16th century

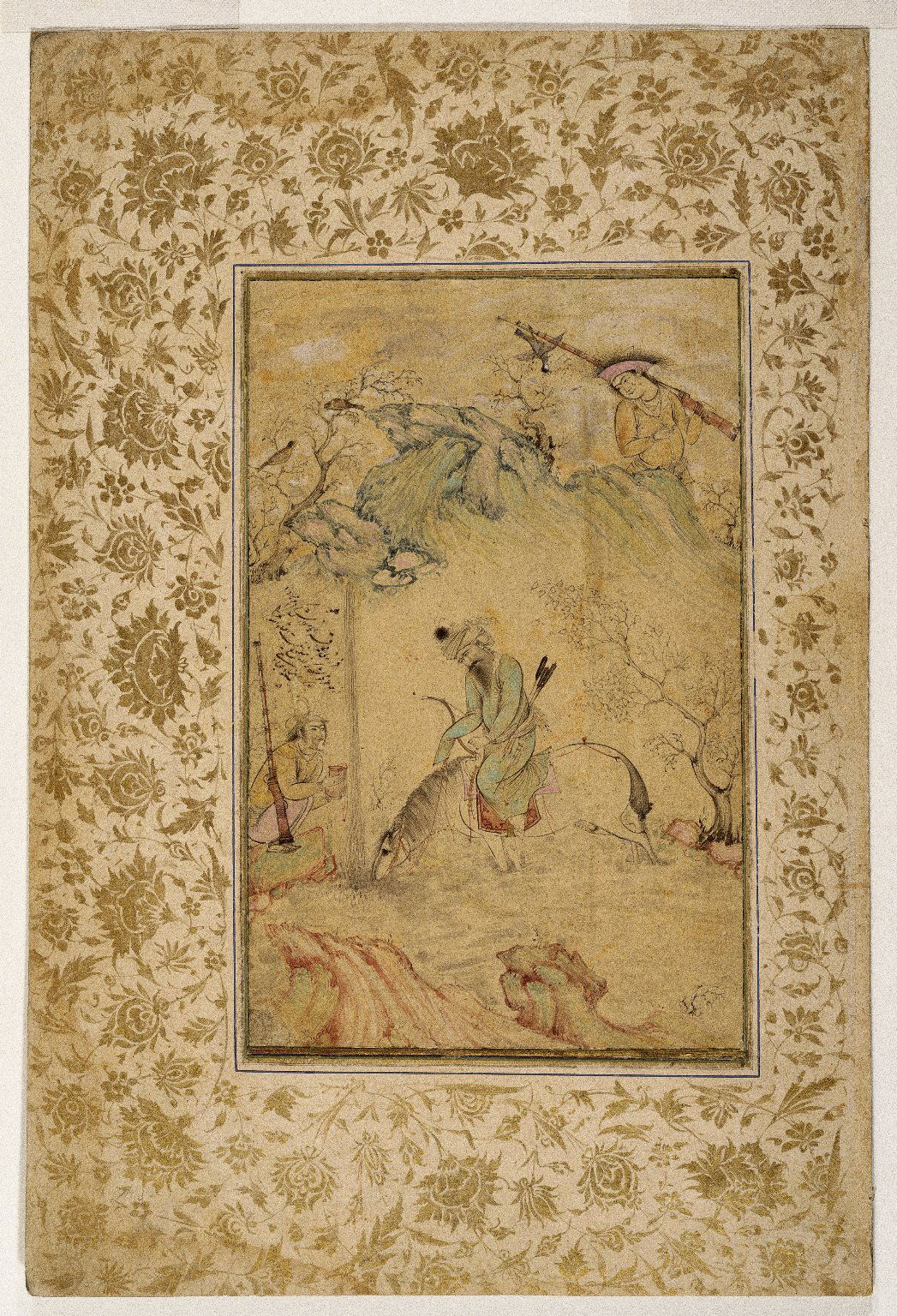
Hunters at a Stream - Riza `Abbasi, c. 1625 Brooklyn Museum

Islamic art is a part of Islamic culture and encompasses the visual arts produced since the 7th century CE by people who lived within territories inhabited or ruled by Muslim populations. Referring to characteristic traditions across a wide range of lands, periods, and genres, Islamic art is a concept used first by Western art historians in the late 19th century. Public Islamic art is traditionally non-representational, except for the widespread use of plant forms, usually in varieties of the spiralling arabesque. These are often combined with Islamic calligraphy, geometric patterns in styles that are typically found in a wide variety of media, from small objects in ceramic or metalwork to large decorative schemes in tiling on the outside and inside of large buildings, including mosques. Other forms of Islamic art include Islamic miniature painting, artefacts like Islamic glass or pottery, and textile arts, such as carpets and embroidery.

The early developments of Islamic art were influenced by Roman art, Early Christian art (particularly Byzantine art), and Sassanian art, with later influences from Central Asian nomadic traditions. Chinese art had a significant influence on Islamic painting, pottery, and textiles. From its beginnings, Islamic art has been based on the written version of the Quran and other seminal religious works, which is reflected by the important role of calligraphy, representing the word as the medium of divine revelation.

Religious Islamic art has been typically characterized by the absence of figures and extensive use of calligraphic, geometric and abstract floral patterns. Nevertheless, representations of human and animal forms historically flourished in nearly all Islamic cultures, although, partly because of opposing religious sentiments, living beings in paintings were often stylized, giving rise to a variety of decorative figural designs.

Both religious and secular art objects often exhibit the same references, styles and forms. These include calligraphy, architecture, textiles and furnishings, such as carpets and woodwork. Secular arts and crafts include the production of textiles, such as clothing, carpets or tents, as well as household objects, made from metal, wood or other materials. Further, figurative miniature paintings have a rich tradition, especially in Persian, Mughal and Ottoman painting. These pictures were often meant to illustrate well-known historical or poetic stories. Some interpretations of Islam, however, include a ban of depiction of animate beings, also known as aniconism. Islamic aniconism stems in part from the prohibition of idolatry and in part from the belief that creation of living forms is God's prerogative.

== Terminology ==
Although the concept of "Islamic art" has been put into question by some modern art historians as a construct of Western cultural views, the similarities between art produced at widely different times and places in the Muslim world, especially in the Islamic Golden Age, have been sufficient to keep the term in wide use as a useful classification since the late 19th century. Scholars such as Jacelyn K. Kerner have drawn attention to its wide-ranging scope referring to more than 40 nations and to the growing public interest both in Western as well as, more recently, in Muslim societies. Further, the List of Islamic museums bears witness to this art historical term having found wide acceptance.

The Encyclopædia Britannica defines "Islamic arts" as including visual arts, literature, performing arts and music that "virtually defies any comprehensive definition". In a strict sense, the term might only refer to artistic manifestations that are closely related to religious practice. Most often, however, it is meant to include "all of the arts produced by Muslim peoples, whether connected with their religion or not."

== Calligraphy ==
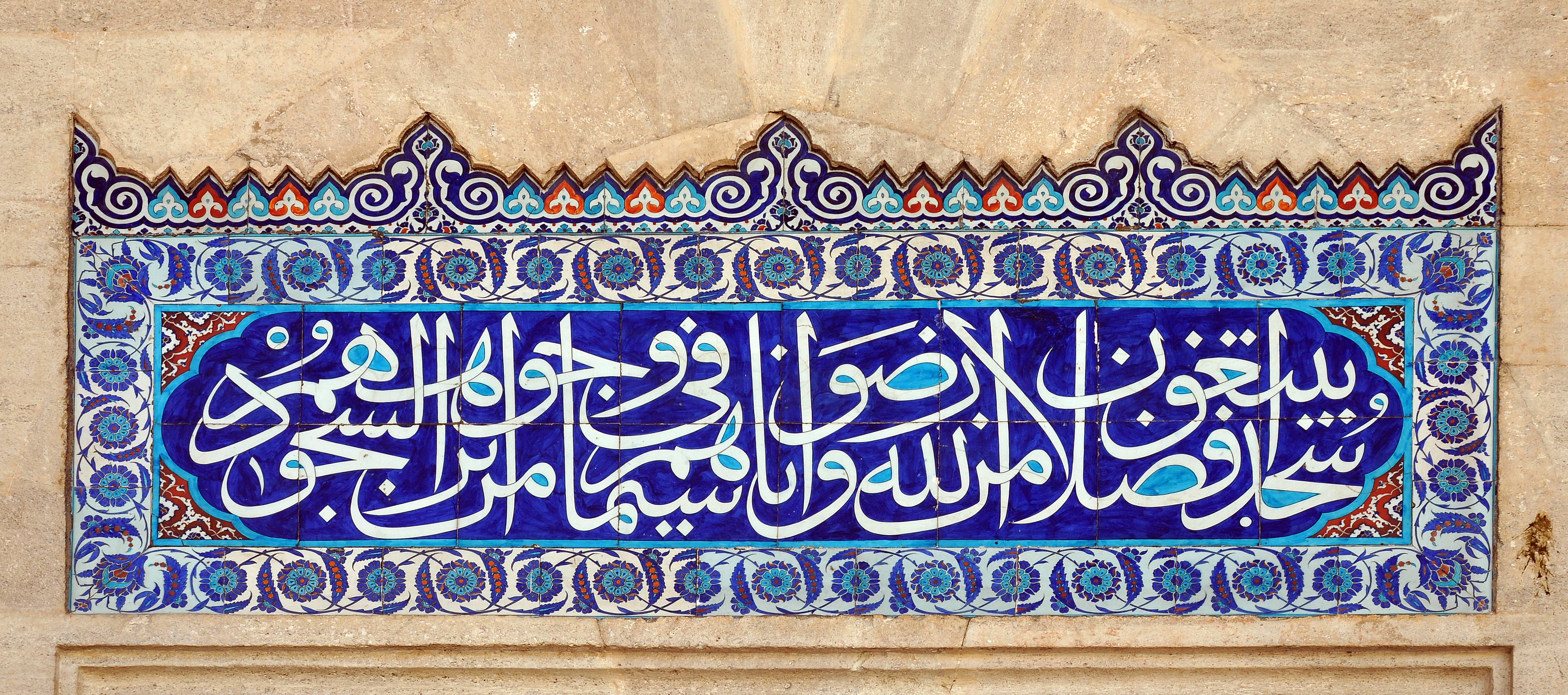
Tiles with some calligraphy in the courtyard of the Süleymaniye Mosque in Istanbul (Turkey)

Calligraphic design is omnipresent in Islamic art, where, as in Europe in the Middle Ages, religious exhortations, including Qur'anic verses, may be included in secular objects, especially coins, tiles and metalwork, and most painted miniatures include some script, as do many buildings. Use of Islamic calligraphy in architecture extended significantly outside of Islamic territories; one notable example is the use of Chinese calligraphy of Arabic verses from the Qur'an in the Great Mosque of Xi'an. Other inscriptions include verses of poetry, and inscriptions recording ownership or donation. Two of the main scripts involved are the symbolic kufic and naskh scripts, which can be found adorning and enhancing the visual appeal of the walls and domes of buildings, the sides of minbars, and metalwork. Islamic calligraphy in the form of painting or sculptures is sometimes referred to as Quranic art.

The various forms of traditional Arabic calligraphy and decoration of the manuscripts used for written versions of the Qur'an represent a central tradition of Islamic visual art. The arabesque is often used to symbolize the transcendent, indivisible and infinite nature of God. Mistakes in repetitions may be intentionally introduced as a show of humility by artists who believe only God can produce perfection, although this theory has also been disputed.

East Persian pottery from the 9th to 11th centuries, decorated only with highly stylised inscriptions and called "epigraphic ware", has been described as "probably the most refined and sensitive of all Persian pottery". Large inscriptions made from tiles, sometimes with the letters raised in relief, or the background cut away, are found on the interiors and exteriors of many important buildings. Complex carved calligraphy also decorates buildings. For most of the Islamic period the majority of coins only showed lettering, which are often very elegant despite their small size and nature of production. The tughra or monogram of an Ottoman sultan was used extensively on official documents, with very elaborate decoration for important ones. Other single sheets of calligraphy, designed for albums, might contain short poems, Qur'anic verses, or other texts.

The main languages, all using Arabic script, are Arabic, always used for Qur'anic verses, Persian in the Persianate world, especially for poetry, and Turkish, with Urdu appearing in later centuries. Calligraphers usually had a higher status than other artists.

Since the mid-20th century following the departure of the Dutch colonialists, several Indonesian painters combined Abstract Expressionism with geometric forms, Indonesian symbols and Islamic calligraphy, creating religiously influenced Abstract Art. The spiritual centre of this movement is the Bandung Institute of Technology (ITB), with leading teachers such as A.D. Pirous, Ahmad Sadali, Mochtar Apin and Umi Dachlan as their main representatives.

== Painting ==
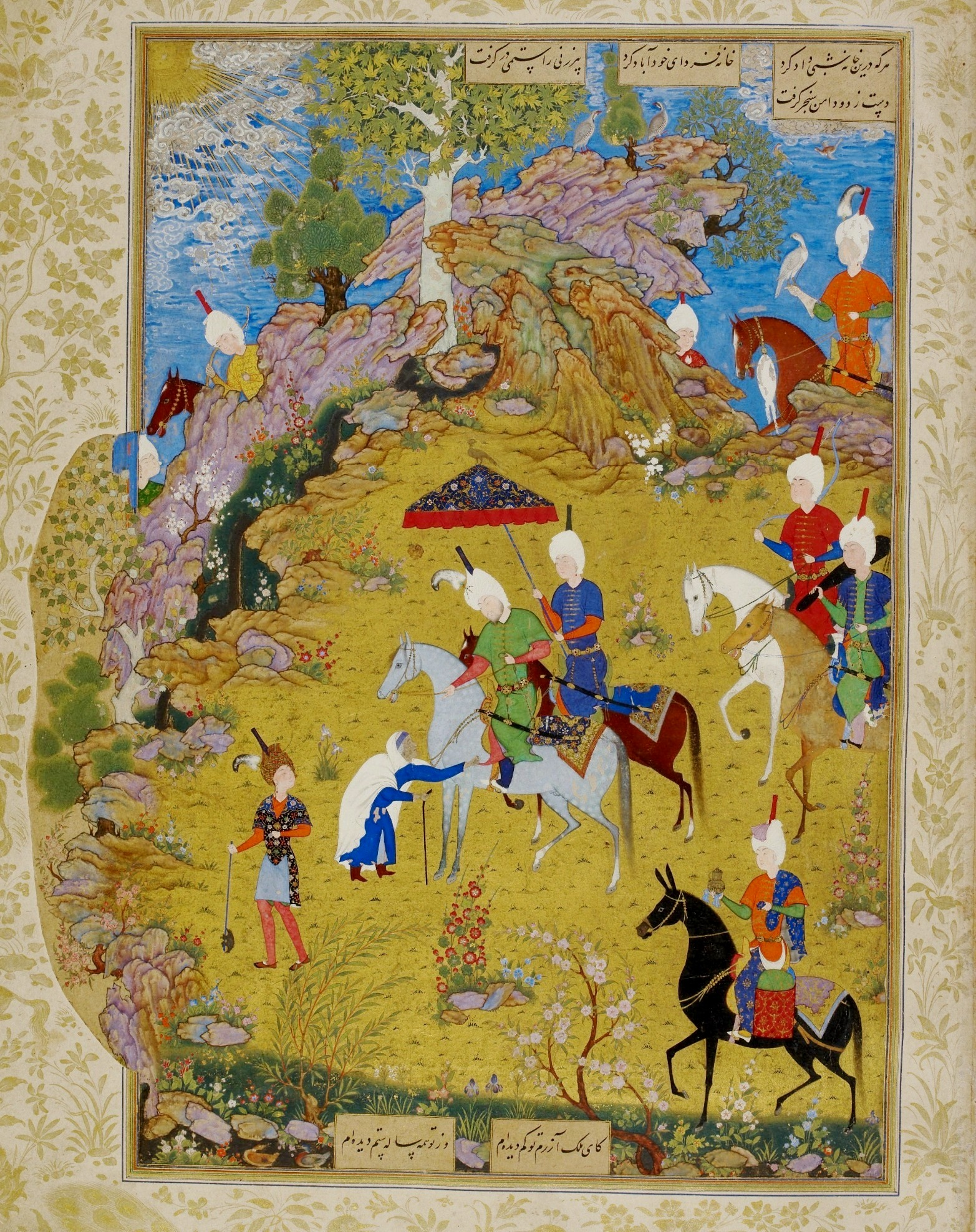
Scene from the Khamsa of Nizami, Persian, 1539–43

For a long time, Islam was considered aniconic. Existing pictures among the Muslim royalty have been described as an "aberration" by Thomas Walker Arnold and ascribed to only a later Persinate and Turkic cultural period. However, figurative arts existed since the formative stage of Islam. Such arts have been boasted by Arabic speaking caliphats of Baghdad, Cairo, and Cordova, inspired by Sasanid and Byzantine models. Figurative arts enjoyed prestige among both orthodox Sunni circles as well as Shia Muslims. The disappearance of royal-sponsored figurative arts in Arabic-speaking lands at a later period is best explained by the overthrow of their ruling dynasties and reduction of most their territories to Ottoman provincial dependencies, not by religious prohibition. Another drawback for Arnold's argument against the religious value of figurative arts in Islamic culture is, that a sizable number of rulers ordering figurative arts in the 14th-17th century, were religious zealots proclaiming to spread and enforce the laws of the sharia.

Although not many early examples survived, human figurative art was a continuous tradition in Islamic lands, notably several of the Umayyad Desert Castles (c. 660–750), and during the Abbasid Caliphate (c. 749–1258). Prior to the early 14th century, a halo was a common symbol to designate rulers. Under Asian influence, the halo as a symbol of sacredness was replaced by a flame. Reminiscent of the Islamic prophet Solomon, rulers were often depicted as sitting on a throne endowed with religious symbols. An ivory casket carved in early eleventh century Cordova shows a Spanish Muslim ruler holding a cup seated upon a lion throne, similar to that of Solomon. A late 12th–13th century bowl depicts an enthroned Seljuk ruler with messengers to either side and headed winged jinn. Other usage of early figurative arts are illustrations of animal fables. Many of them are of Sanskrit origin and translated into Middle Persian in the sixth century for delight, ethical discussion, and political edification. In the 8th century, they were translated into Arabic.

Although there has been a tradition of wall-paintings, especially in the Persianate world, the best-surviving and highest developed form of painting in the Islamic world is the miniature in illuminated manuscripts, or later as a single page for inclusion in a muraqqa or bound album of miniatures and calligraphy. The tradition of the Persian miniature has been dominant since about the 13th century, strongly influencing the Ottoman miniature of Turkey and the Mughal miniature in India. The term "Persian miniature" refers whereby to the language used to decorate the images, and should not obscure its ties to Arabic imagery.

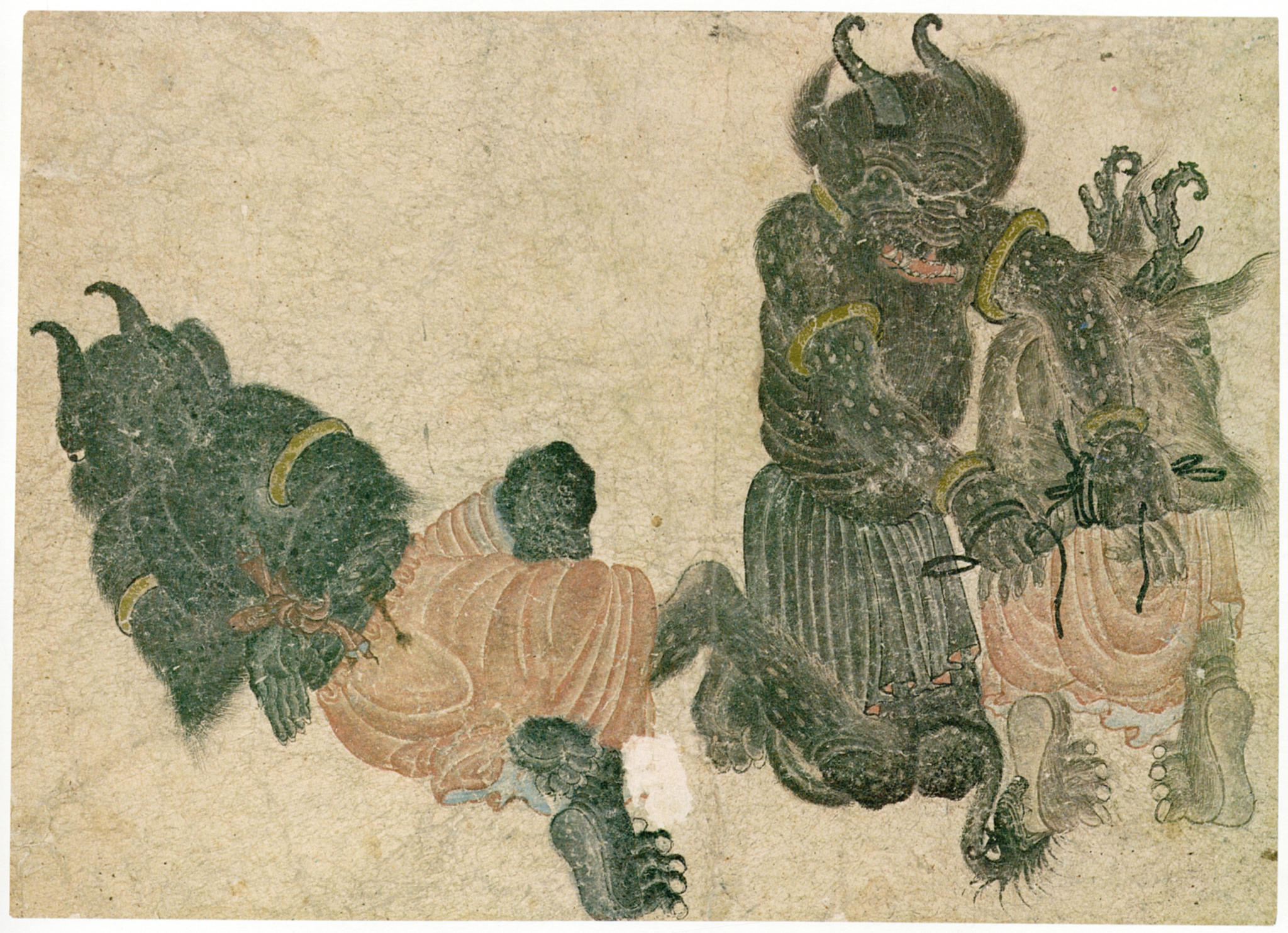
Portrayal of demons in the style of Siyah Qalem. Siyah Qalem Hazine 2153, s.31b

Siyah Qalam (Black Pen), frequently depicts anecdotes charged with Islamic imagery about the animal souls (nafs) and the "ruling soul" (rūḥ). Most human characters are clothed like dervishes and bearded like ascetics in Islamic tradition. Animals often feature as symbol of the lower and untaimed self. The abstract forces to tame the physical body are depicted in the forms of demons (dīv) and angels.

Chinese influences included the early adoption of the vertical format natural to a book, which led to the development of a birds-eye view where a very carefully depicted background of hilly landscape or palace buildings rises up to leave only a small area of sky. The figures are arranged in different planes on the background, with recession (distance from the viewer) indicated by placing more distant figures higher up in the space, but at essentially the same size. The colours, which are often very well preserved, are strongly contrasting, bright and clear. The tradition reached a climax in the 16th and early 17th centuries, but continued until the early 19th century, and has been revived in the 20th.

In the 21st century, iconophobic followers of various Islamist groups, such as the Taliban, aim to destroy forms of Islamic figurative depictions. Motivated by Saudi mentors (Wahhabism), the Taliban launched an attack on arts in March 2001 in Afghanistan. The religious justification derives from a hadith mentioned by Sahih Bukhari. Others see the rejection of iconography as rooting in a strict aversion to depiction of God throughout Islamic tradition.

== Rugs and carpets ==
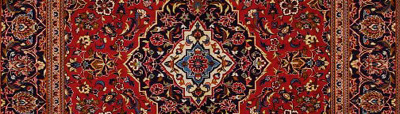
From the yarn fiber to the colors, every part of the Persian rug is traditionally handmade from natural ingredients over the course of many months

No Islamic artistic product has become better known outside the Islamic world than the pile carpet, more commonly referred to as the Oriental carpet (oriental rug). Their versatility is utilized in everyday Islamic and Muslim life, from floor coverings to architectural enrichment, from cushions to bolsters to bags and sacks of all shapes and sizes, and to religious objects (such as a prayer rug, which would provide a clean place to pray). They have been a major export to other areas since the late Middle Ages, used to cover not only floors but tables, for long a widespread European practice that is now common only in the Netherlands. Carpet weaving is a rich and deeply embedded tradition in Islamic societies, and the practice is seen in large city factories as well as in rural communities and nomadic encampments. In earlier periods, special establishments and workshops were in existence that functioned directly under court patronage.

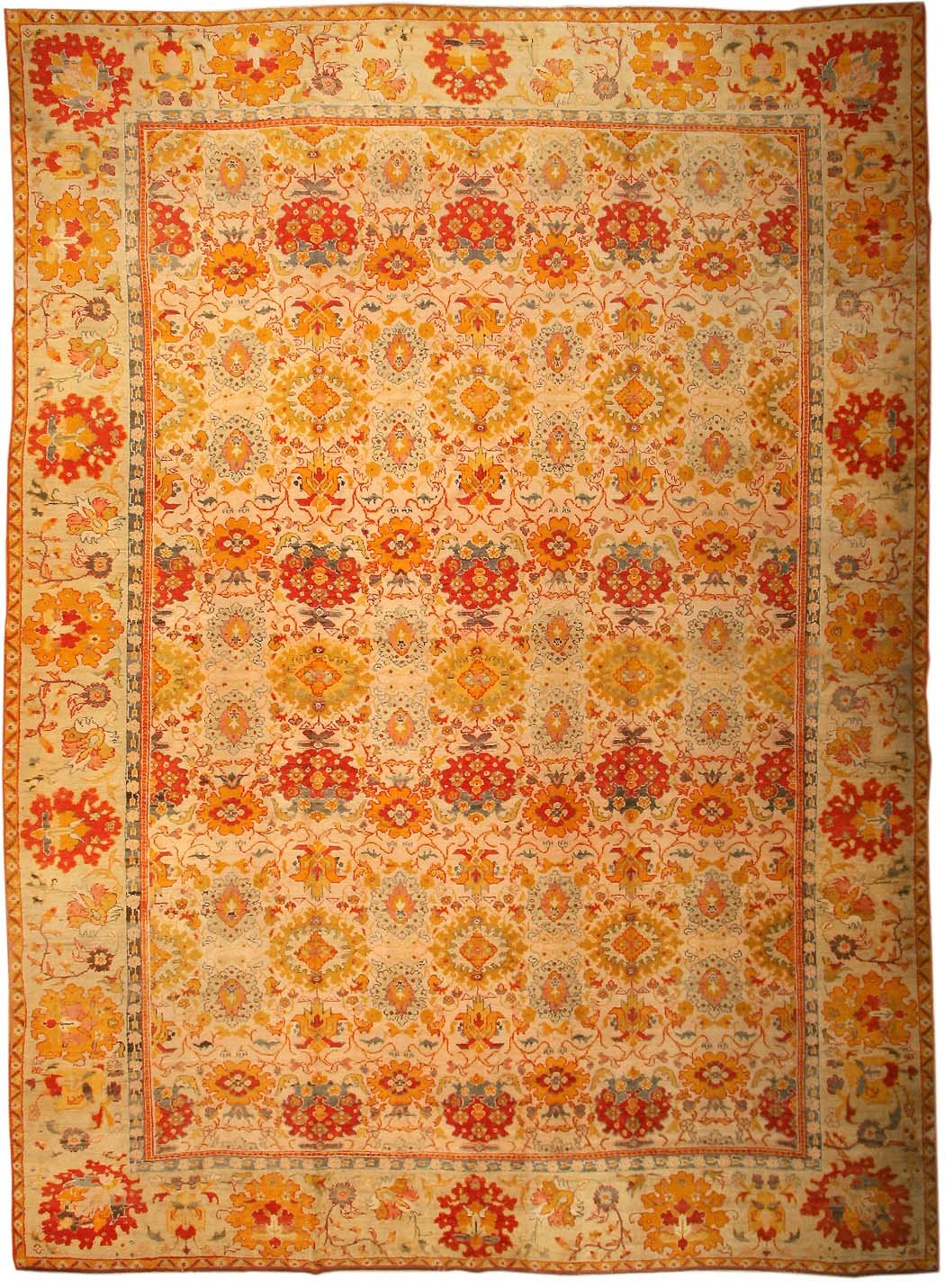
Turkish Ushak carpet

Very early Islamic carpets, i.e. those before the 16th century, are extremely rare. More have survived in the West and oriental carpets in Renaissance painting from Europe are a major source of information on them, as they were valuable imports that were painted accurately. The most natural and easy designs for a carpet weaver to produce consist of straight lines and edges, and the earliest Islamic carpets to survive or be shown in paintings have geometric designs, or centre on very stylized animals, made up in this way. Since the flowing loops and curves of the arabesque are central to Islamic art, the interaction and tension between these two styles was long a major feature of carpet design.

There are a few survivals of the grand Egyptian 16th century carpets, including one almost as good as new discovered in the attic of the Pitti Palace in Florence, whose complex patterns of octagon roundels and stars, in just a few colours, shimmer before the viewer. Production of this style of carpet began under the Mamluks but continued after the Ottomans conquered Egypt. The other sophisticated tradition was the Persian carpet which reached its peak in the 16th and early 17th century in works like the Ardabil Carpet and Coronation Carpet; during this century the Ottoman and Mughal courts also began to sponsor the making in their domains of large formal carpets, evidently with the involvement of designers used to the latest court style in the general Persian tradition. These use a design style shared with non-figurative Islamic illumination and other media, often with a large central gul motif, and always with wide and strongly demarcated borders. The grand designs of the workshops patronized by the court spread out to smaller carpets for the merely wealthy and for export, and designs close to those of the 16th and 17th centuries are still produced in large numbers today. The description of older carpets has tended to use the names of carpet-making centres as labels, but often derived from the design rather than any actual evidence that they originated from around that centre. Research has clarified that designs were by no means always restricted to the centre they are traditionally associated with, and the origin of many carpets remains unclear.

As well as the major Persian, Turkish and Arab centres, carpets were also made across Central Asia, in India, and in Spain and the Balkans. Spanish carpets, which sometimes interrupted typical Islamic patterns to include coats of arms, enjoyed high prestige in Europe, being commissioned by royalty and for the Papal Palace, Avignon, and the industry continued after the Reconquista. Armenian carpet-weaving is mentioned by many early sources, and may account for a much larger proportion of East Turkish and Caucasian production than traditionally thought. The Berber carpets of North Africa have a distinct design tradition. Apart from the products of city workshops, in touch with trading networks that might carry the carpets to markets far away, there was also a large and widespread village and nomadic industry producing work that stayed closer to traditional local designs. As well as pile carpets, kelims and other types of flat-weave or embroidered textiles were produced, for use on both floors and walls. Figurative designs, sometimes with large human figures, are very popular in Islamic countries but relatively rarely exported to the West, where abstract designs are generally what the market expects.

== Ceramics ==
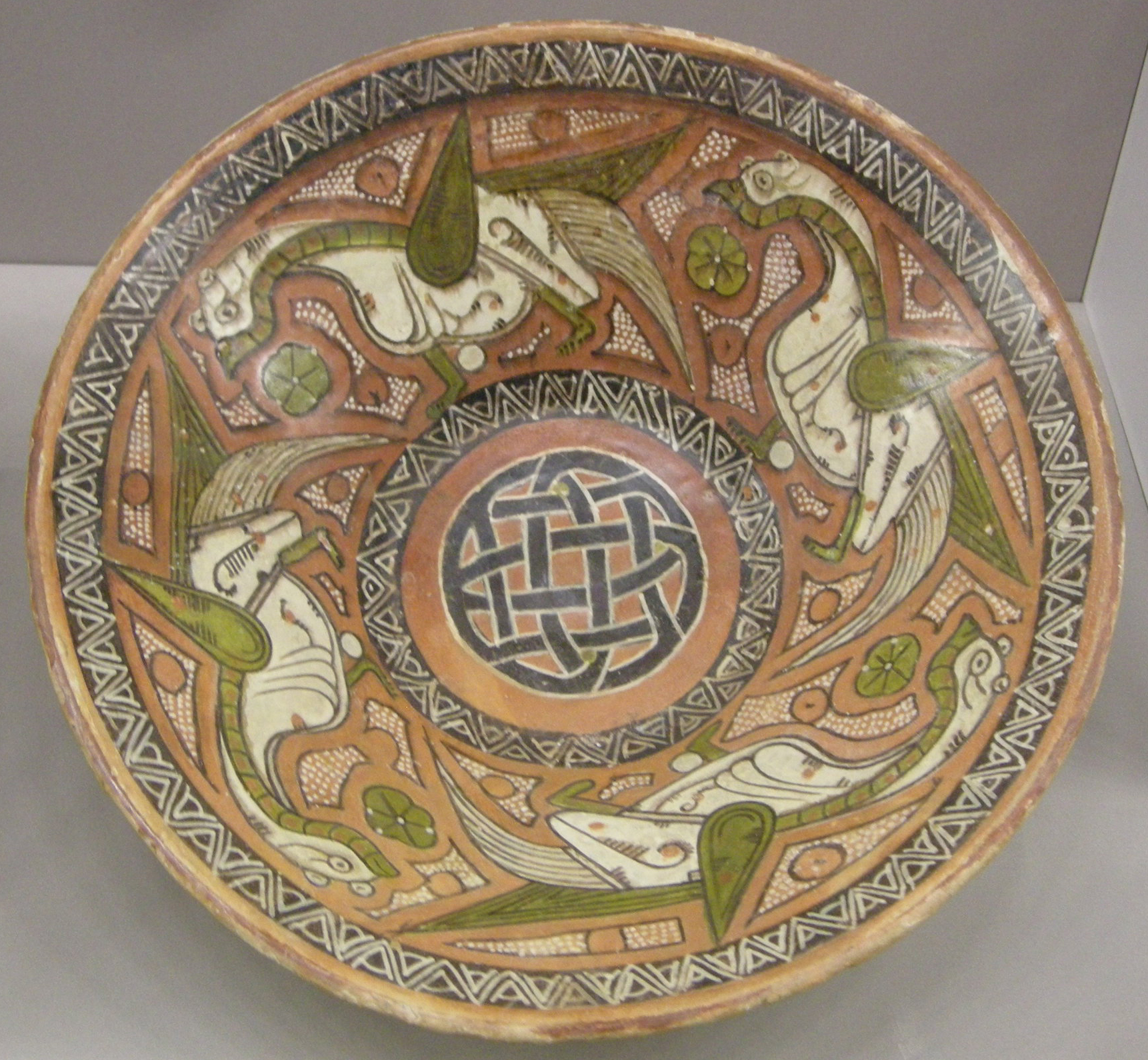
10th-century dish from East Persia

Islamic art has very notable achievements in ceramics, both in pottery and tiles for walls, which in the absence of wall-paintings were taken to heights unmatched by other cultures. Early pottery is often unglazed, but tin-opacified glazing was one of the earliest new technologies developed by the Islamic potters. The first Islamic opaque glazes can be found as blue-painted ware in Basra, dating to around the 8th century. Another significant contribution was the development of stonepaste ceramics, originating from 9th century Iraq. The first industrial complex for glass and pottery production was built in Raqqa, Syria, in the 8th century. Other centers for innovative pottery in the Islamic world included Fustat (from 975 to 1075), Damascus (from 1100 to around 1600) and Tabriz (from 1470 to 1550). Lusterwares with iridescent colours may have continued pre-Islamic Roman and Byzantine techniques, but were either invented or considerably developed on pottery and glass in Persia and Syria from the 9th century onwards.

Islamic pottery was often influenced by Chinese ceramics, whose achievements were greatly admired and emulated. This was especially the case in the periods after the Mongol invasions and those of the Timurids. Techniques, shapes and decorative motifs were all affected. Until the Early Modern period Western ceramics had very little influence, but Islamic pottery was very sought after in Europe, and often copied. An example of this is the albarello, a type of maiolica earthenware jar originally designed to hold apothecaries' ointments and dry drugs. The development of this type of pharmacy jar had its roots in the Islamic Middle East. Hispano-Moresque examples were exported to Italy, stimulating the earliest Italian examples, from 15th century Florence.

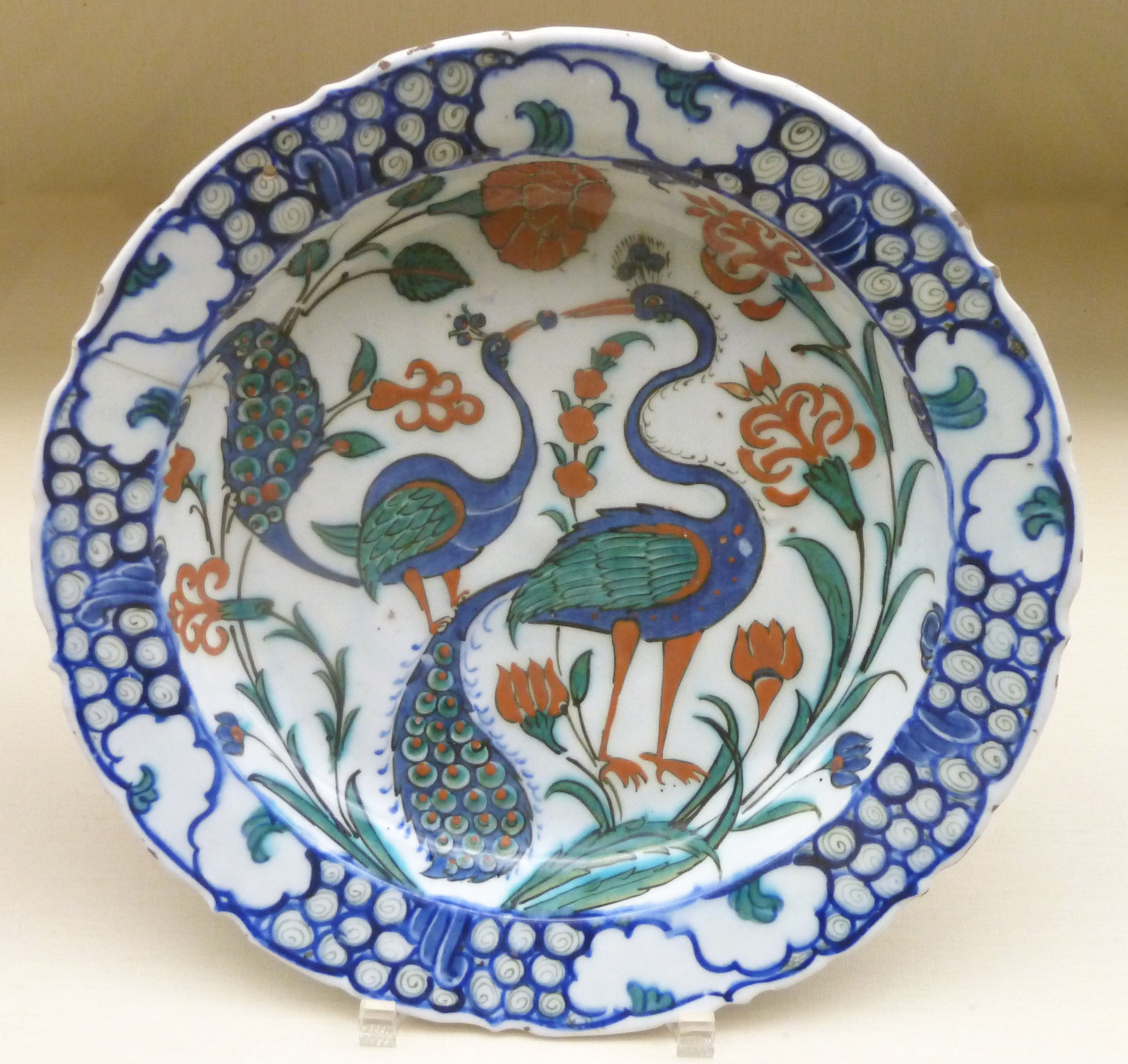
Iznik glazed pottery ca. 1575

The Hispano-Moresque style emerged in Al-Andalus - Muslim Spain - in the 8th century, under Egyptian influence, but most of the best production was much later, by potters presumed to have been largely Muslim but working in areas reconquered by the Christian kingdoms. It mixed Islamic and European elements in its designs, and much was exported across neighbouring European countries. It had introduced two ceramic techniques to Europe: glazing with an opaque white tin-glaze, and painting in metallic lusters. Ottoman İznik pottery produced most of the best work in the 16th century, in tiles and large vessels boldly decorated with floral motifs influenced, once again, by Chinese Yuan and Ming ceramics. These were still in earthenware; there was no porcelain made in Islamic countries until modern times, though Chinese porcelain was imported and admired.

The medieval Islamic world also had pottery with painted animal and human imagery. Examples are found throughout the medieval Islamic world, particularly in Persia and Egypt.

=== Tiling ===
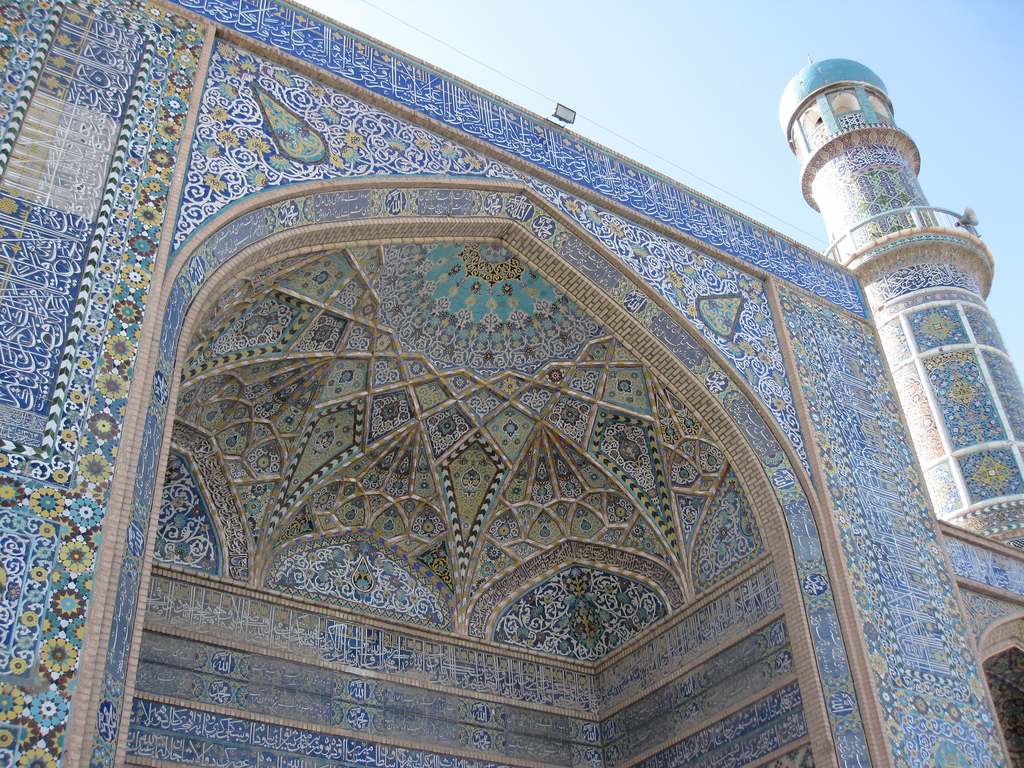
Tiled exterior of the Friday Mosque of Herat, Afghanistan

The earliest grand Islamic buildings, like the Dome of the Rock in Jerusalem, had interior walls decorated with mosaics in the Byzantine style, but without human figures. From the 9th century onwards the distinctive Islamic tradition of glazed and brightly coloured tiling for interior and exterior walls and domes developed. Some earlier schemes create designs using mixtures of tiles each of a single colour that are either cut to shape or are small and of a few shapes, used to create abstract geometric patterns. Later large painted schemes use tiles painted before firing with a part of the scheme – a technique requiring confidence in the consistent results of firing.

Some elements, especially the letters of inscriptions, may be moulded in three-dimensional relief, and in especially in Persia certain tiles in a design may have figurative painting of animals or single human figures. These were often part of designs mostly made up of tiles in plain colours, but with larger fully painted tiles at intervals. The larger tiles are often shaped as eight-pointed stars, and may show animals or a human head or bust, or plant or other motifs. The geometric patterns, such as modern North African zellij work, made of small tiles each of a single colour but different and regular shapes, are often referred to as "mosaic", which is not strictly correct.

The Mughals made much less use of tiling, preferring (and being able to afford) "parchin kari", a type of pietra dura decoration from inlaid panels of semi-precious stones, with jewels in some cases. This can be seen at the Taj Mahal, Agra Fort and other imperial commissions. The motifs are usually floral, in a simpler and more realistic style than Persian or Turkish work, relating to plants in Mughal miniatures.

== Glass ==
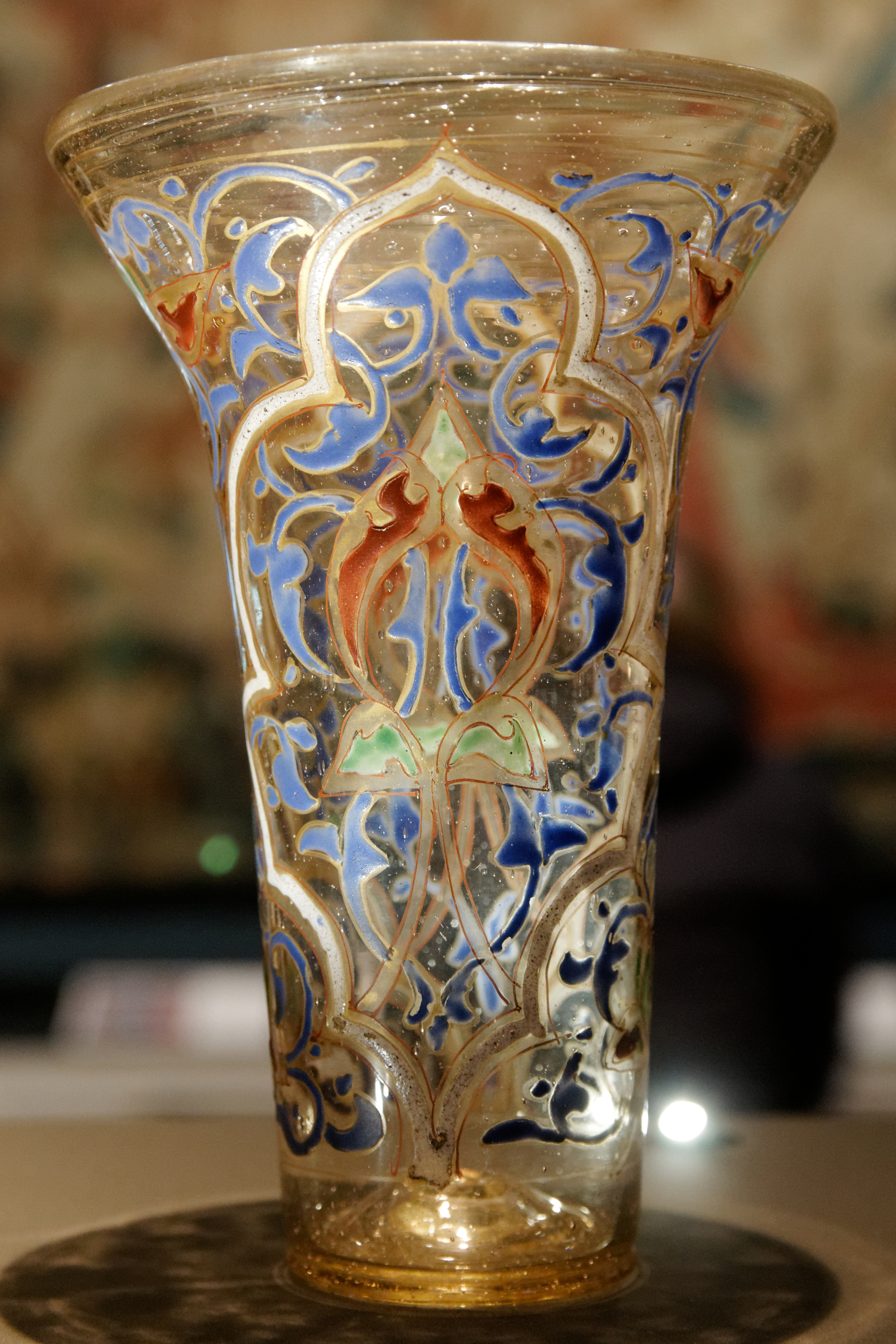
"The Luck of Edenhall", a 13th-century Syrian beaker in England since the Middle Ages

For most of the Middle Ages Islamic glass was the most sophisticated in Eurasia, exported to both Europe and China. Islam took over much of the traditional glass-producing territory of Sassanian and Ancient Roman glass, and since figurative decoration played a small part in pre-Islamic glass, the change in style is not abrupt, except that the whole area initially formed a political whole, and, for example, Persian innovations were now almost immediately taken up in Egypt. For this reason, it is often impossible to distinguish between the various centres of production, of which Egypt, Syria and Persia were the most important, except by scientific analysis of the material, which itself has difficulties. From various documentary references glassmaking and glass trading seems to have been a speciality of the Jewish minority in several centres.

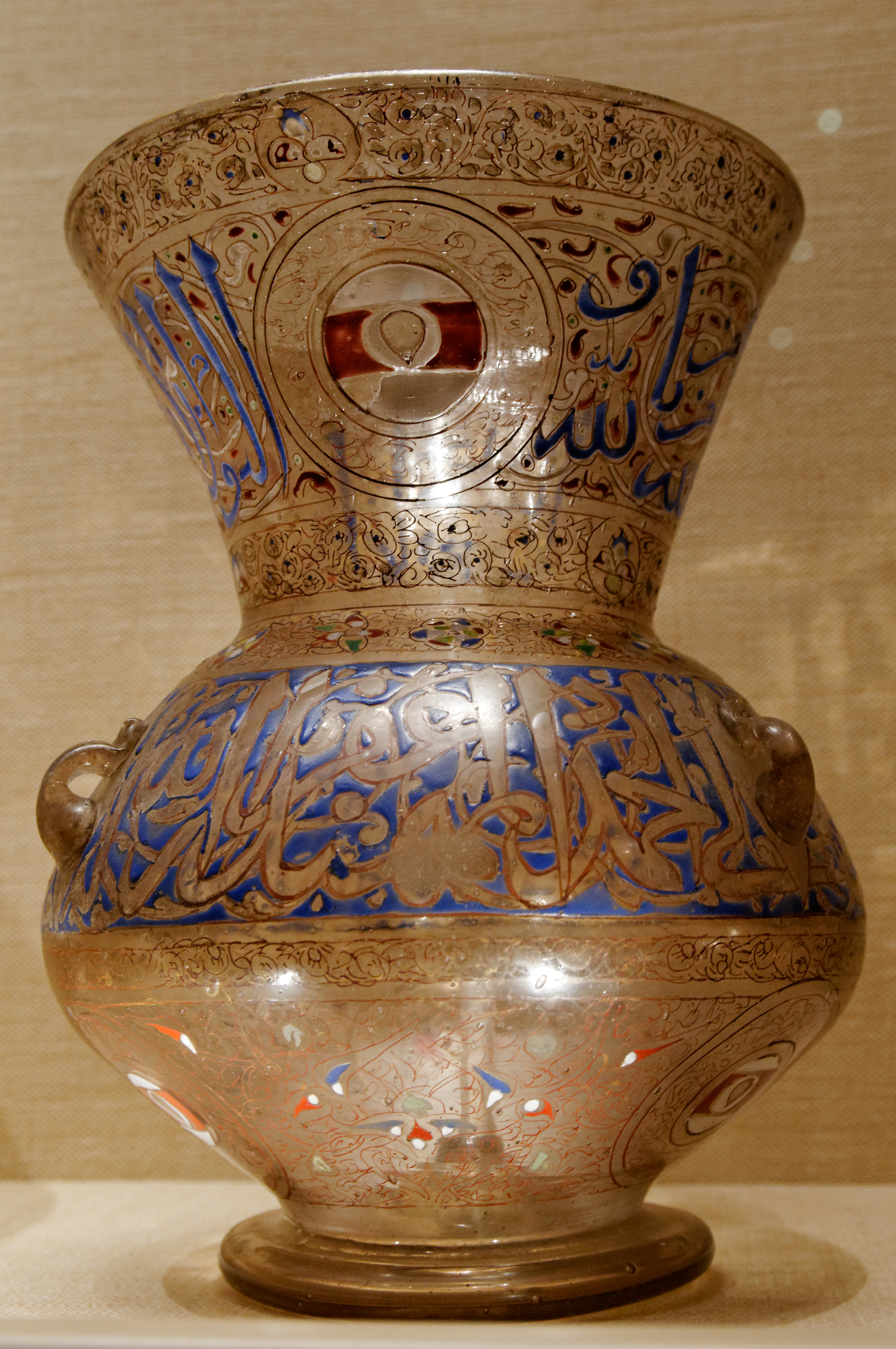
Mamluk mosque lamp

Between the 8th and early 11th centuries the emphasis in luxury glass was on effects achieved by "manipulating the surface" of the glass, initially by incising into the glass on a wheel and later by cutting away the background to leave a design in relief. The very massive Hedwig glasses, only found in Europe but normally considered Islamic (or possibly from Muslim craftsmen in Norman Sicily), are an example of this, though puzzlingly late in date. These and other glass pieces probably represented cheaper versions of vessels of carved rock crystal (clear quartz), themselves influenced by earlier glass vessels. and there is some evidence that at this period glass cutting and hardstone carving were regarded as the same craft. From the 12th century the industry in Persia and Mesopotamia appears to decline, and the main production of luxury glass shifts to Egypt and Syria, and decorative effects of colour on smooth surfaced glass. Throughout the period local centres made simpler wares such as Hebron glass in Palestine.

Lustre painting, by techniques similar to lustreware in pottery, dates back to the 8th century in Egypt and became widespread in the 12th century. Another technique was decoration with threads of glass of a different colour, worked into the main surface, and sometimes manipulated by combing and other effects. Gilded, painted, and enameled glass were added to the repertoire, and shapes and motifs borrowed from other media, such as pottery and metalwork. Some of the finest work was in mosaic lamps donated by a ruler or wealthy man. As decoration grew more elaborate, the quality of the basic glass decreased, and it "often has a brownish-yellow tinge and is rarely free from bubbles.". Aleppo seems to have ceased to be a major centre after the Mongol invasion of 1260, and Timur appears to have ended the Syrian industry about 1400 by carrying off the skilled workers to Samarkand. By about 1500 the Venetians were receiving large orders for mosque lamps.

== Metalwork ==
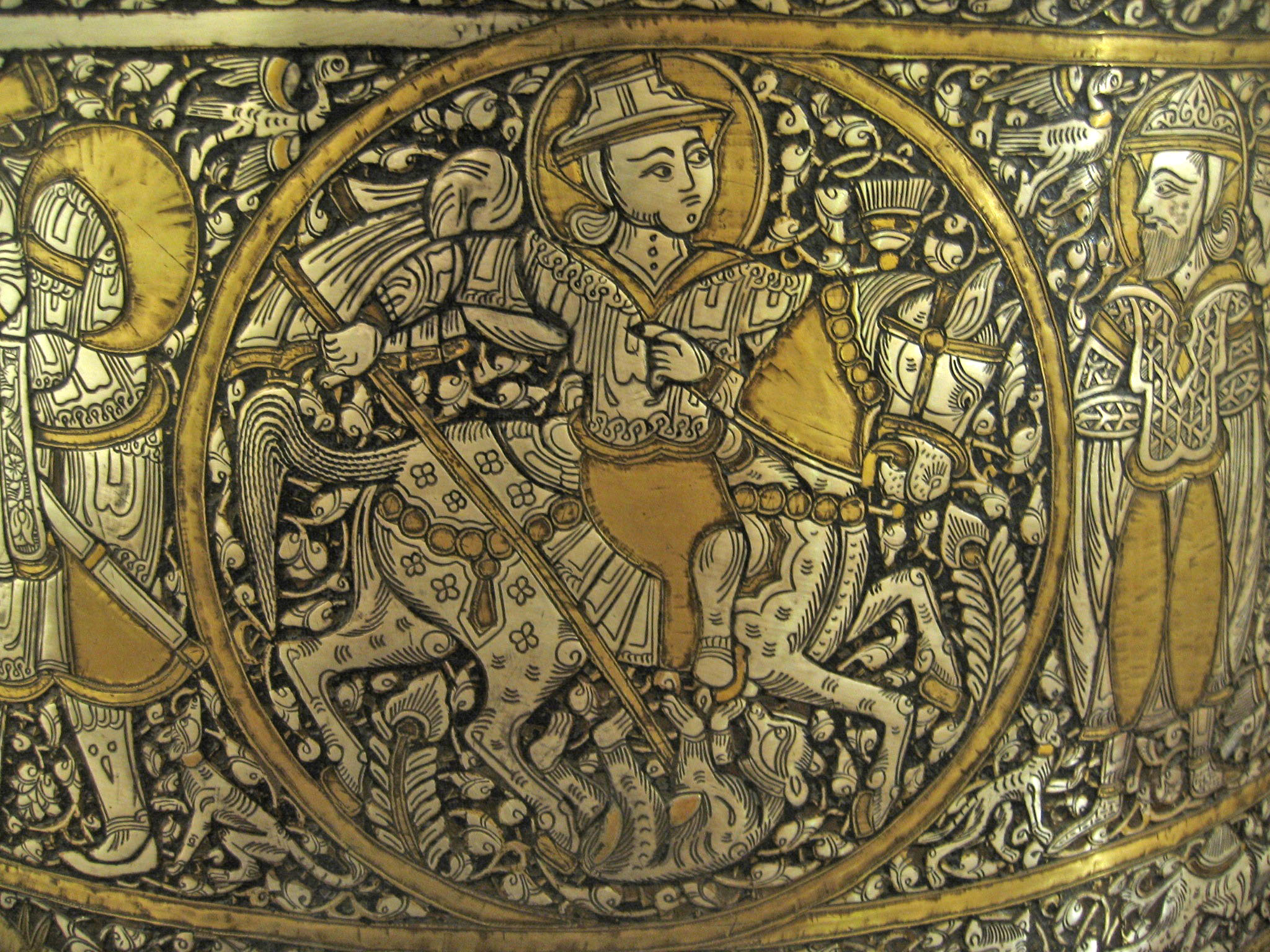
Detail of the "Baptistère de Saint Louis," c. 1300, a Mamluk basin of engraved brass with gold, silver and niello inlay

Medieval Islamic metalwork offers a complete contrast to its European equivalent, which is dominated by modelled figures and brightly coloured decoration in enamel, some pieces entirely in precious metals. In contrast surviving Islamic metalwork consists of practical objects mostly in brass, bronze, and steel, with simple, but often monumental shapes, and surfaces highly decorated with dense decoration in a variety of techniques, but colour mostly restricted to inlays of gold, silver, copper or black niello. The most abundant survivals from medieval periods are fine brass objects, handsome enough to preserve, but not valuable enough to be melted down. The abundant local sources of zinc, compared to tin, explains the rarity of bronze. Household items, such as ewers or water pitchers, were made of one or more pieces of sheet brass, soldered together and subsequently worked and inlaid.

The use of drinking and eating vessels in gold and silver, the ideal in ancient Rome and Persia as well as medieval Christian societies, is prohibited by the Hadiths, as was the wearing of gold rings. Islamic metalworkers shared with their European counterparts a relatively high social status, compared to other artists and craftsmen, and many larger pieces are signed.

Islamic metalwork includes some three-dimensional animal figures, such as fountainheads or aquamaniles, but only one significant enamelled object of Byzantine cloisonné technique is known. The Pisa Griffin is the largest surviving bronze animal, probably from 11th century Al-Andalus. More common objects with elaborate decoration include massive low candlesticks and lamp-stands, lantern lights, bowls, dishes, basins, buckets (these probably for the bath), and ewers, as well as caskets, pen-cases and plaques. Ewers and basins were brought for hand-washing before and after each meal, and so are often lavishly treated display pieces. A typical 13th century ewer from Khorasan is decorated with foliage, animals and the Signs of the Zodiac in silver and copper, and carries a blessing. Specialized objects include knives, arms and armour (always of high interest to the elite) and scientific instruments such as astrolabes, as well as jewellery. Decoration is typically densely packed and very often includes arabesques and calligraphy, sometimes naming an owner and giving a date.

== Other applied arts ==
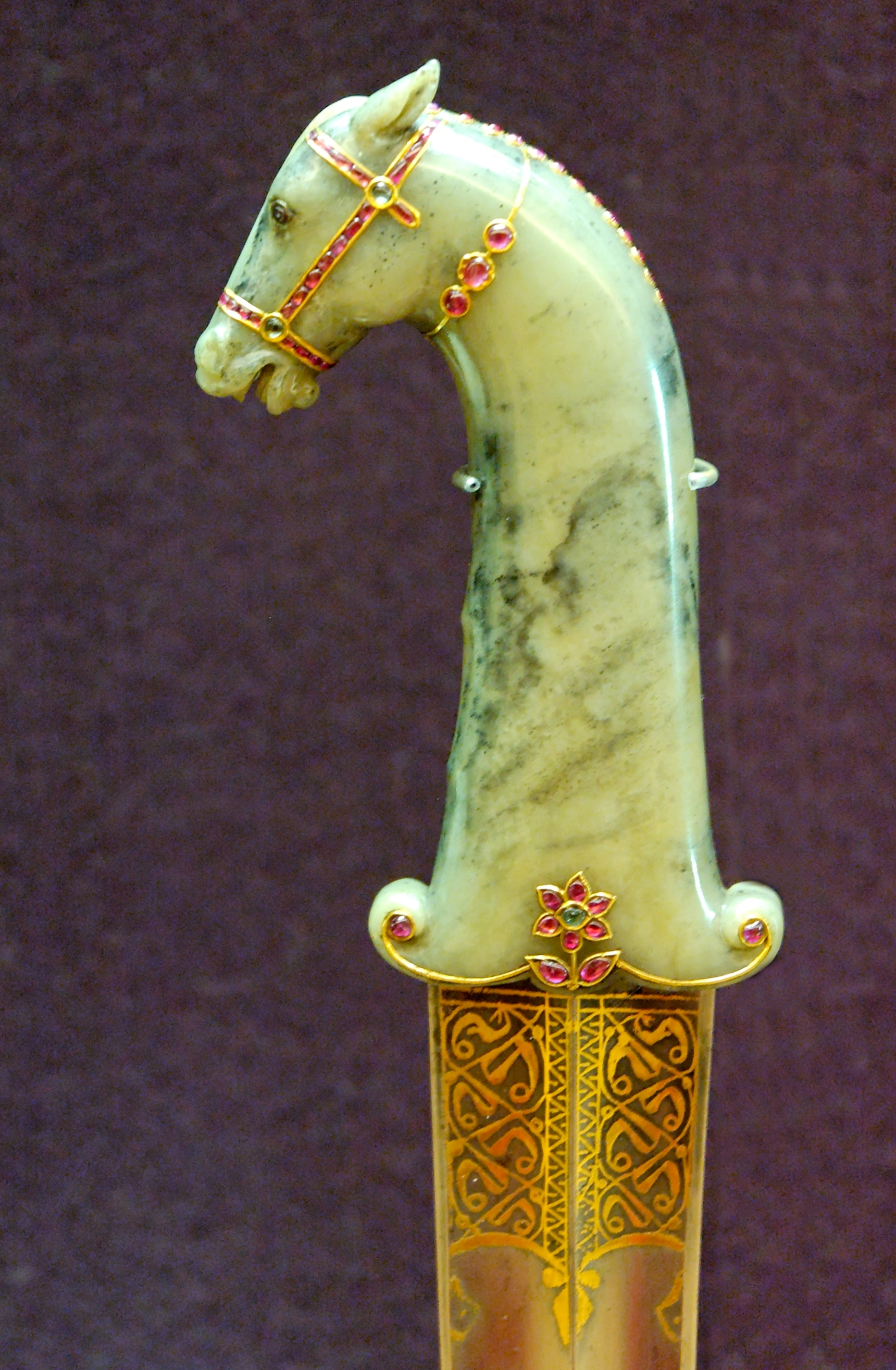
Mughal dagger with hilt in jade, gold, rubies and emeralds. Blade of damascened steel inlaid with gold.

High levels of achievement were reached in other materials, including hardstone carvings and jewellery, ivory carving, textiles and leatherwork. During the Middle Ages, Islamic work in these fields was highly valued in other parts of the world and often traded outside the Islamic zone. Apart from miniature painting and calligraphy, other arts of the book are decorative illumination, the only type found in Qur'an manuscripts, and Islamic book covers, which are often highly decorative in luxury manuscripts, using either the geometric motifs found in illumination, or sometimes figurative images probably drawn for the craftsmen by miniature painters. Materials include coloured, tooled and stamped leather and lacquer over paint.

=== Precious stones ===
Egyptian carving of rock crystal into vessels appears in the late 10th century, and virtually disappears after about 1040 C.E. There are a number of these vessels in the West, which apparently came on the market after the Cairo palace of the Fatimid Caliph was looted by his mercenaries in 1062, and were snapped up by European buyers, mostly ending up in church treasuries. From later periods, especially the hugely wealthy Ottoman and Mughal courts, there are a considerable number of lavish objects carved in semi-precious stones, with little surface decoration, but inset with jewels. Such objects may have been made in earlier periods, but few have survived.

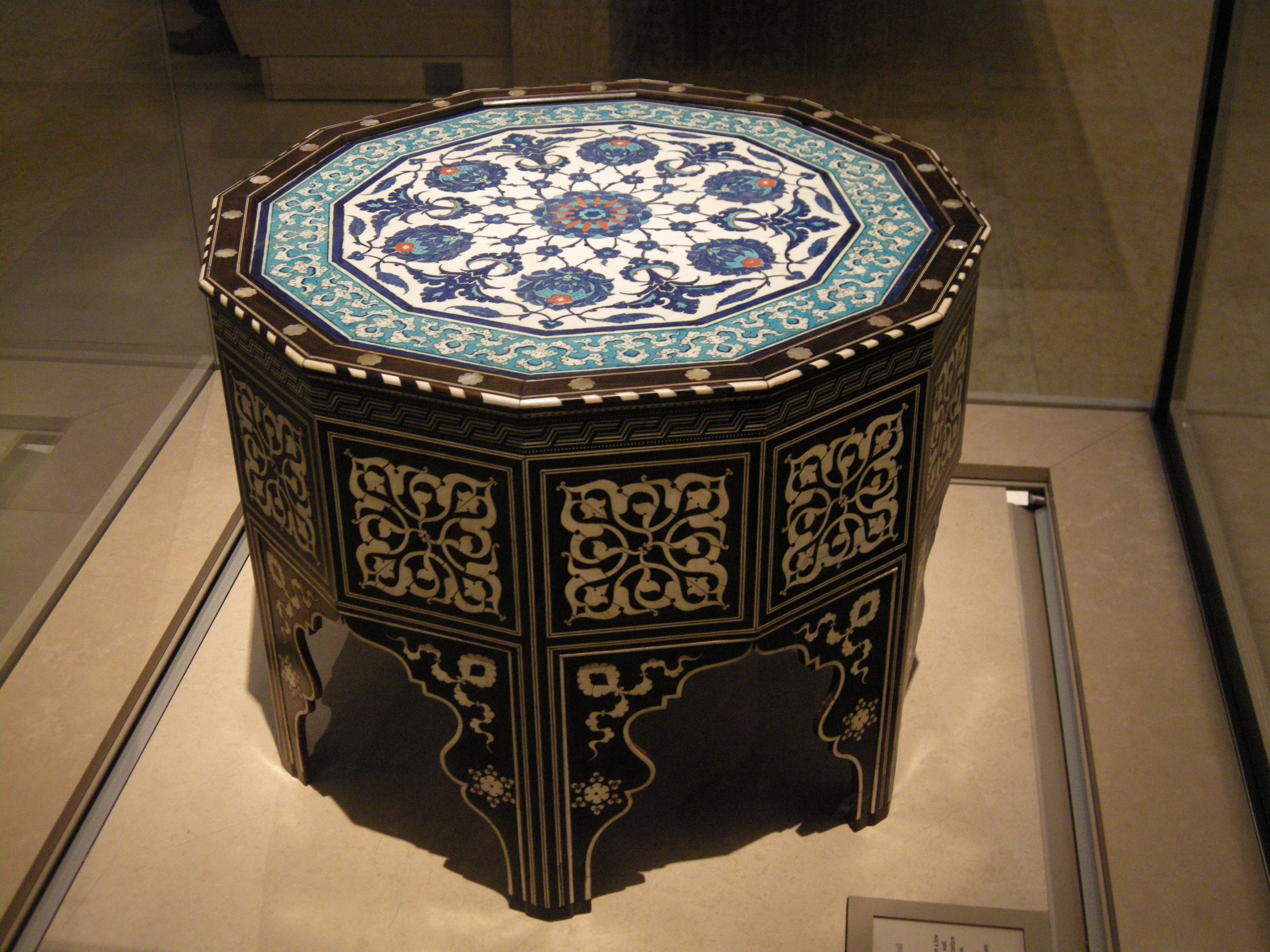
Ottoman marquetry and tile-top table, about 1560

=== House and furniture ===
Older wood carving is typically relief or pierced work on flat objects for architectural use, such as screens, doors, roofs, beams and friezes. An important exception are the complex muqarnas and mocárabe designs giving roofs and other architectural elements a stalactite-like appearance. These are often in wood, sometimes painted on the wood, but often plastered over before painting; the examples at the Alhambra in Granada, Spain are among the best known. Traditional Islamic furniture, except for chests, tended to be covered with cushions, with cupboards rather than cabinets for storage, but there are some pieces, including a low round (strictly twelve-sided) table of about 1560 from the Ottoman court, with marquetry inlays in light wood, and a single huge ceramic tile or plaque on the tabletop. The fine inlays typical of Ottoman court furniture may have developed from styles and techniques used in weapons and musical instruments, for which the finest craftsmanship available was used. There are also intricately decorated caskets and chests from various periods. A spectacular and famous (and far from flat) roof was one of the Islamic components of the 12th century Norman Cappella Palatina in Palermo, which picked from the finest elements of Catholic, Byzantine and Islamic art. Other famous wooden roofs are in the Alhambra in Granada.

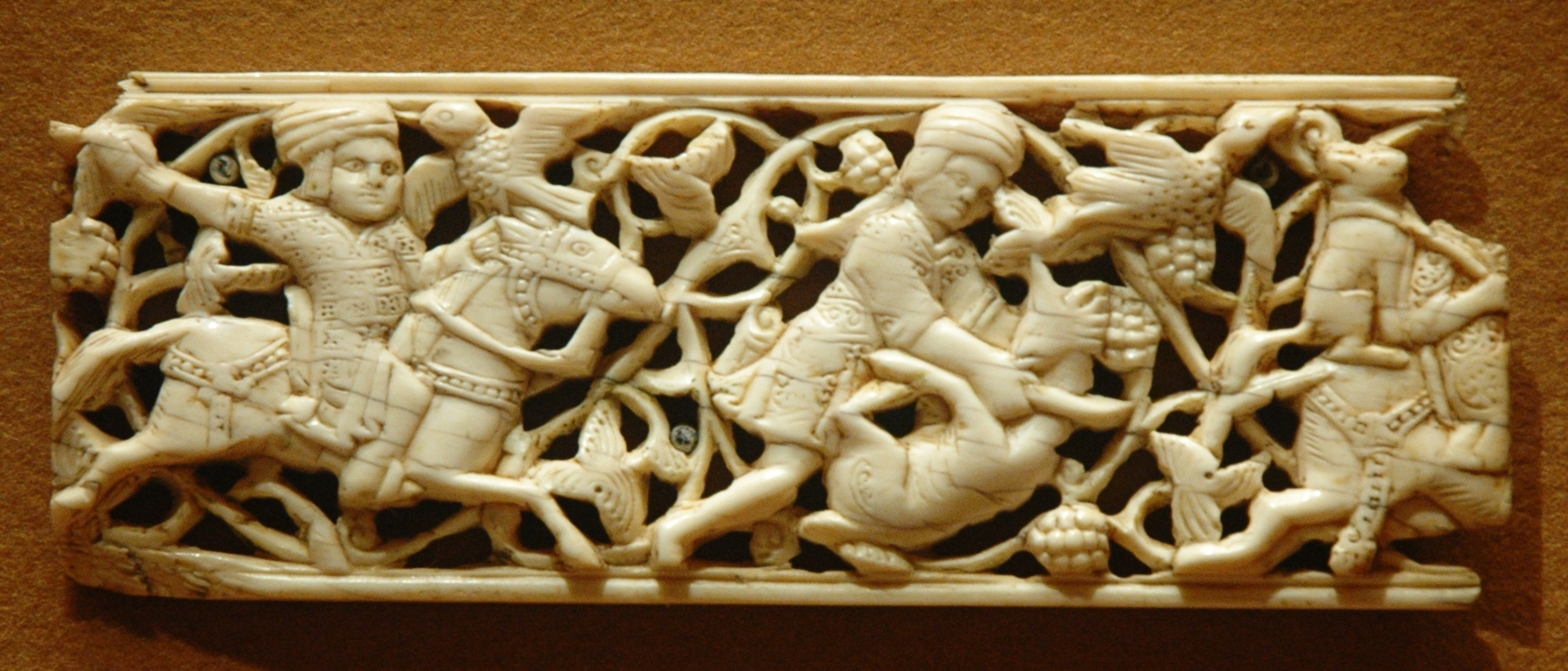
Ivory with traces of paint, 11th–12th century, Egypt

=== Ivory ===
Ivory carving centred on the Mediterranean, spreading from Egypt, where a thriving Coptic industry had been inherited; Persian ivory is rare. The normal style was a deep relief with an even surface; some pieces were painted. Spain specialized in caskets and round boxes, which were probably used to keep jewels and perfumes. They were produced mainly in the approximate period of 930–1050, and widely exported. Many pieces are signed and dated, and on court pieces the name of the owner is often inscribed; they were typically gifts from a ruler. As well as a court workshop, Cordoba had commercial workshops producing goods of slightly lower quality. In the 12th and 13th century workshops in Norman Sicily produced caskets, apparently then migrating to Granada and elsewhere after persecution. Egyptian work tended to be in flat panels and friezes, for insertion into woodwork and probably furniture – most are now detached from their settings. Many were calligraphic, and others continued Byzantine traditions of hunting scenes, with backgrounds of arabesques and foliage in both cases.

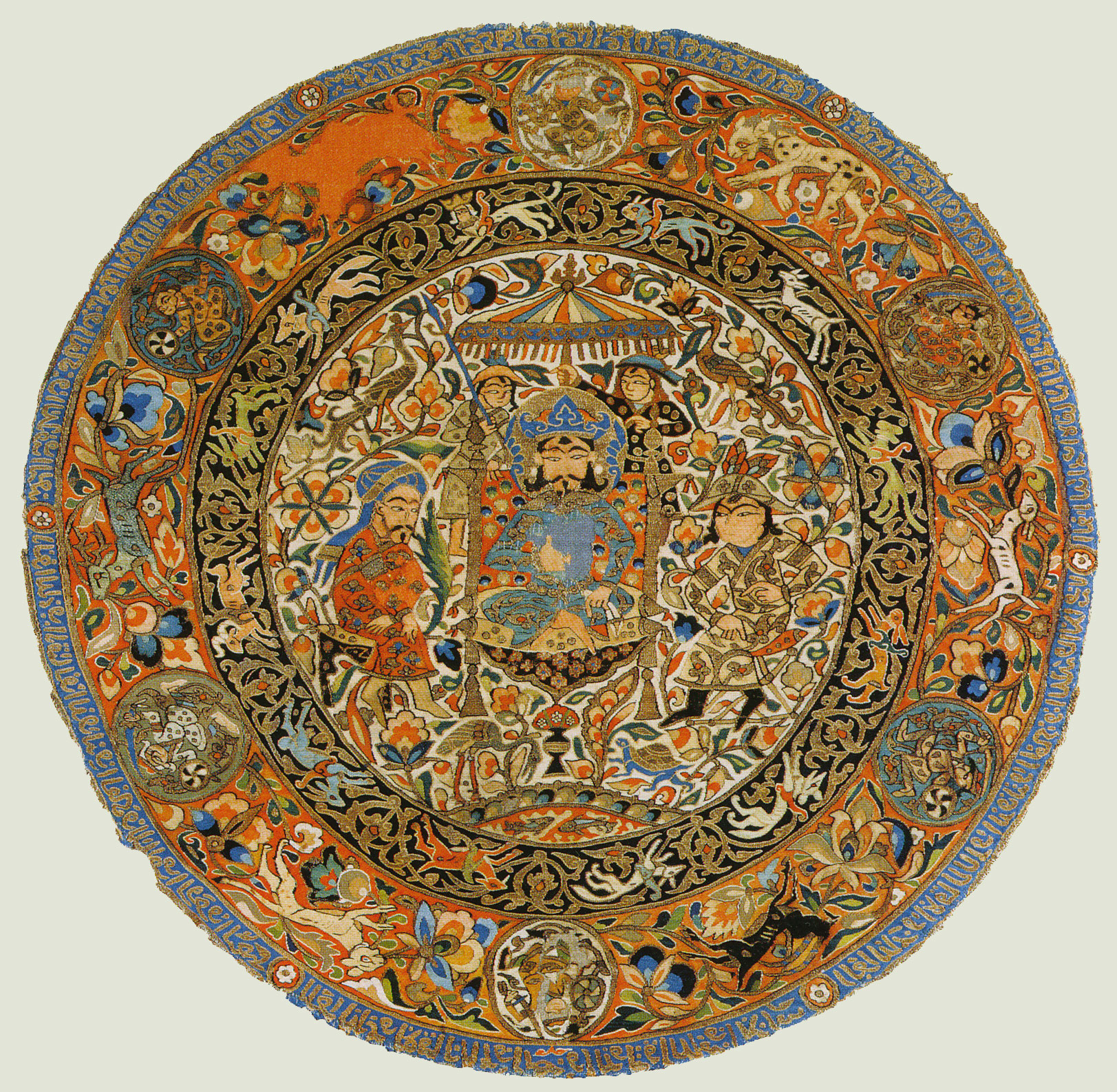
Ilkhanid piece in silk, cotton and gold, Iran or Iraq, early 14th century

=== Silk ===
Despite Hadith sayings prohibiting the wearing of silk, the Byzantine and Sassanian traditions of grand figured silk woven cloth continued under Muslim rule. Some designs are calligraphic, especially when made for palls to cover a tomb, but more are surprisingly conservative versions of the earlier traditions, with many large figures of animals, especially majestic symbols of power like the lion and eagle. These are often enclosed in roundels, as found in the pre-Islamic traditions. The majority of early silks have been recovered from tombs, and in Europe reliquaries, where the relics were often wrapped in silk. European clergy and nobility were keen buyers of Islamic silk from an early date and, for example, the body of an early bishop of Toul in France was wrapped in a silk from the Bukhara area in modern Uzbekistan, probably when the body was reburied in 820. The Shroud of St Josse is a famous samite cloth from East Persia, which originally had a carpet-like design with two pairs of confronted elephants, surrounded by borders including rows of camels and an inscription in Kufic script, from which the date appears to be before 961. Other silks were used for clothes, hangings, altarcloths, and church vestments, which have nearly all been lost, except for some vestments.

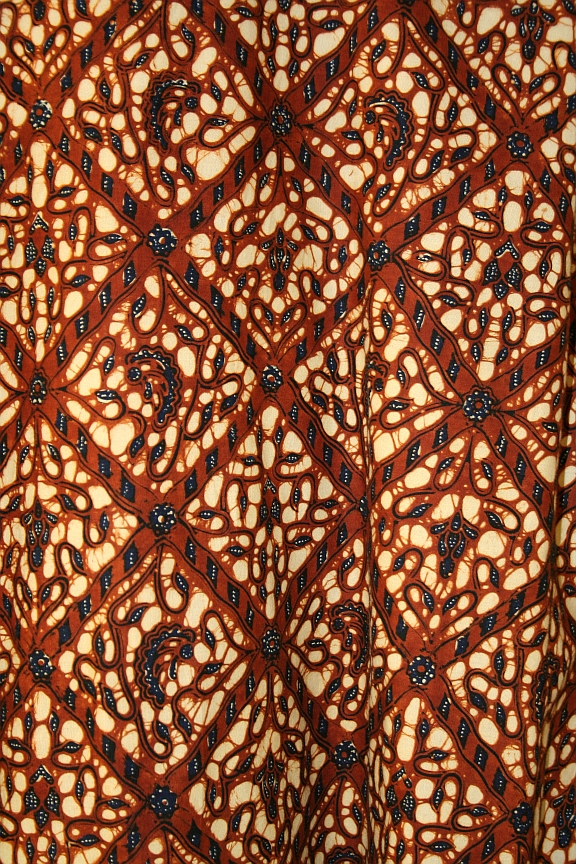
Javanese court batik

Ottoman silks were less exported, and the many surviving royal kaftans have simpler geometric patterns, many featuring stylized "tiger-stripes" below three balls or circles. Other silks have foliage designs comparable to those on Iznik pottery or carpets, with bands forming ogival compartments a popular motif. Some designs begin to show Italian influence. By the 16th century Persian silk was using smaller patterns, many of which showed relaxed garden scenes of beautiful boys and girls from the same world as those in contemporary album miniatures, and sometimes identifiable scenes from Persian poetry. A 16th-century circular ceiling for a tent, 97 cm across, shows a continuous and crowded hunting scene; it was apparently looted by the army of Suleiman the Magnificent in his invasion of Persia in 1543–45, before being taken by a Polish general at the Siege of Vienna in 1683. Mughal silks incorporate many Indian elements, and often feature relatively realistic "portraits" of plants, as found in other media.

=== Indonesian batik ===
The development and refinement of Indonesian batik cloth was closely linked to Islam. The Islamic prohibition on certain images encouraged batik design to become more abstract and intricate. Realistic depictions of animals and humans are rare on traditional batik. However, mythical serpents, humans with exaggerated features and the Garuda of pre-Islamic mythology are common motifs.

Although its existence pre-dates Islam, batik reached its zenith in royal Muslim courts such as Mataram and Yogyakarta, whose sultans encouraged and patronised batik production. Today, batik is undergoing a revival, and cloths are used for additional purposes such as wrapping the Quran.

== Architecture ==
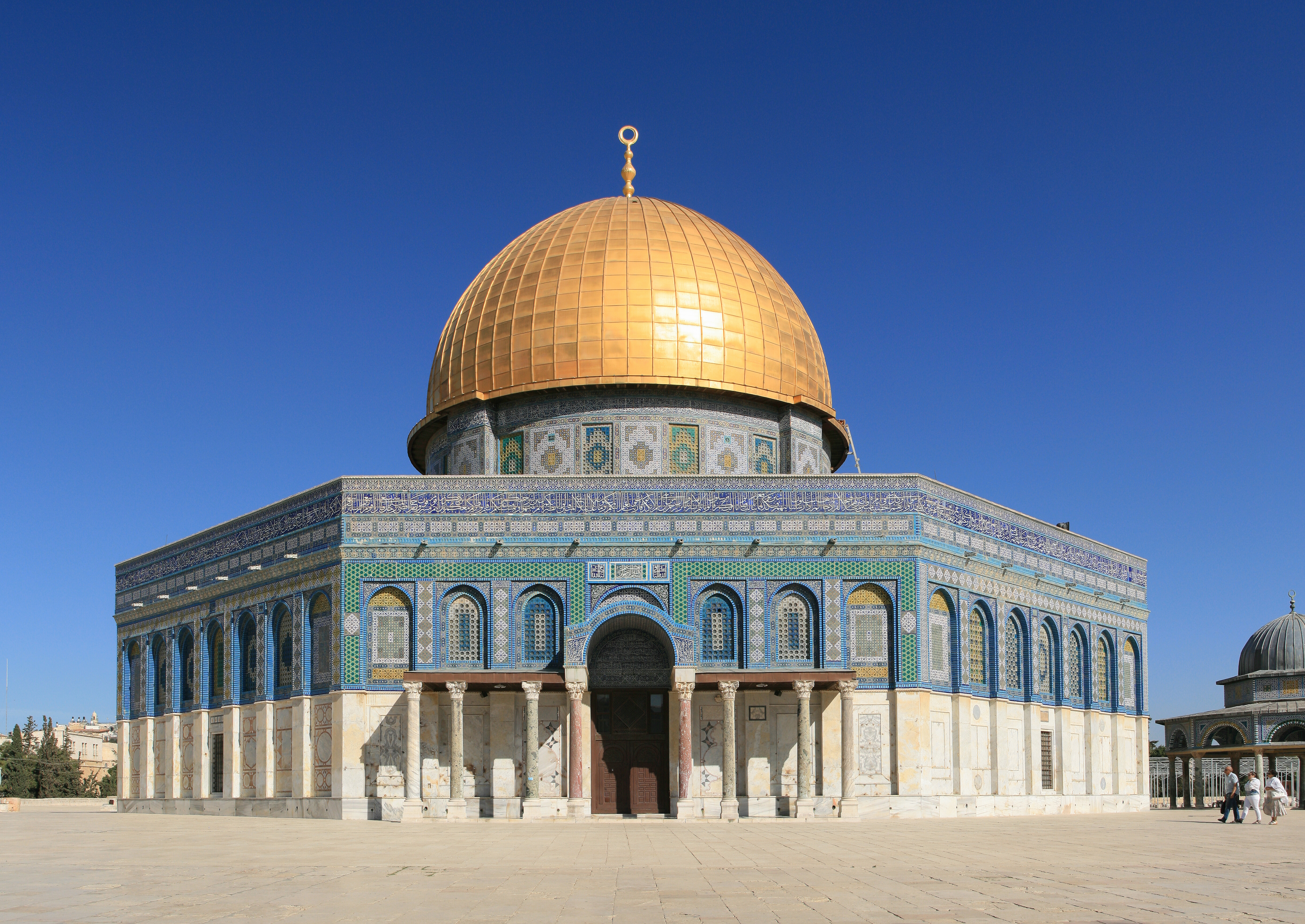
Dome of the Rock in Jerusalem, built in the late 7th century (with later renovations), one of the most important monuments of Islamic architecture

Unlike some mediums in Islamic art, Islamic architecture was consistently prominent across the Islamic world. In general, patrons invested more resources into building monuments than they did in the production of art objects and knowledge of Islamic architecture is more complete thanks to the many buildings that have survived across regions and periods. Early Islamic architecture drew on existing regional traditions of architecture in late antiquity and later developed into various regional traditions. Innovations from one region often spread to others.

Applied decoration played a particularly important role in Islamic architecture, and this decoration made use of the same motifs predominant in other forms of Islamic art: arabesques, epigraphy, geometric patterns, and other vegetal forms. Methods of decoration included carving, inlay, and painting in materials such as brick, stone, tile, plaster, and wood.

== See also ==
- Islamic culture
- Arabic miniature
- Islamic graffiti
- List of museums of Islamic art
- Siyah Qalam
- Glossary of Islam
- Outline of Islam
- Index of Islam-related articles
