= Bagh-e-Ghoushkhane minaret =

Bagh-e-Ghoushkhaneh Minaret مناره باغ قوشخانه
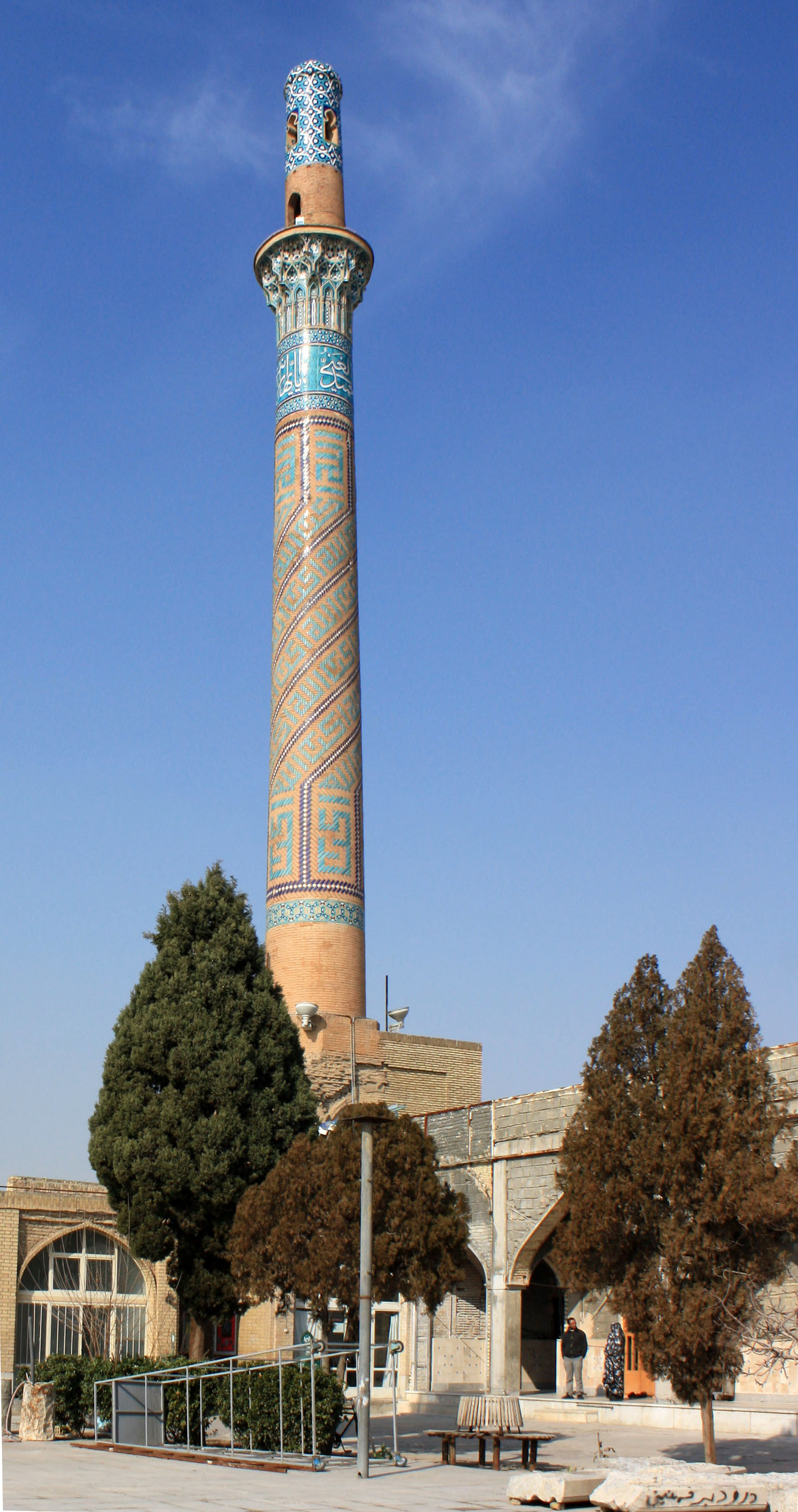

- Location within Iran

Religion
- Affiliation: Islam
- Province: Isfahan

Location
- Location: Isfahan, Iran
- Municipality: Isfahan
- Coordinates: 32.684444°N 51.688611°E

Architecture
- Type: Minaret
- Style: Azari
- Height (max): 38 m
- Designated as NHL

Iran National Heritage List
- Official name: Bagh-e-Ghoushkhaneh Minaret
- Type: Minaret
- Designated: 1938
- Reference no.: 313
- Conservation organization: Cultural Heritage, Handicrafts and Tourism Organization of Iran

Bagh-e-Ghoushkhane minaret (Persian: مناره باغ قوشخانه) is a historical minaret in Isfahan, Iran. This minaret dates back to the 14th century. In the olden days it was in the neighborhood of the old city gate. Because of its proximity to the Ali ebn-e Sahl mausoleum it is also known as Ali-ebn-e-Sahl minaret. Its newest famous name is Bagh-e-Ghoushkhane minaret, because of its proximity to the Ghushkhaneh garden. A part of its vertex and tiles have collapsed.
