= Burg Weiler Altarpiece =

C.1470 triptych

Burg Weiler Altar Triptych
- Altarpiece with the Virgin and Child and Saints
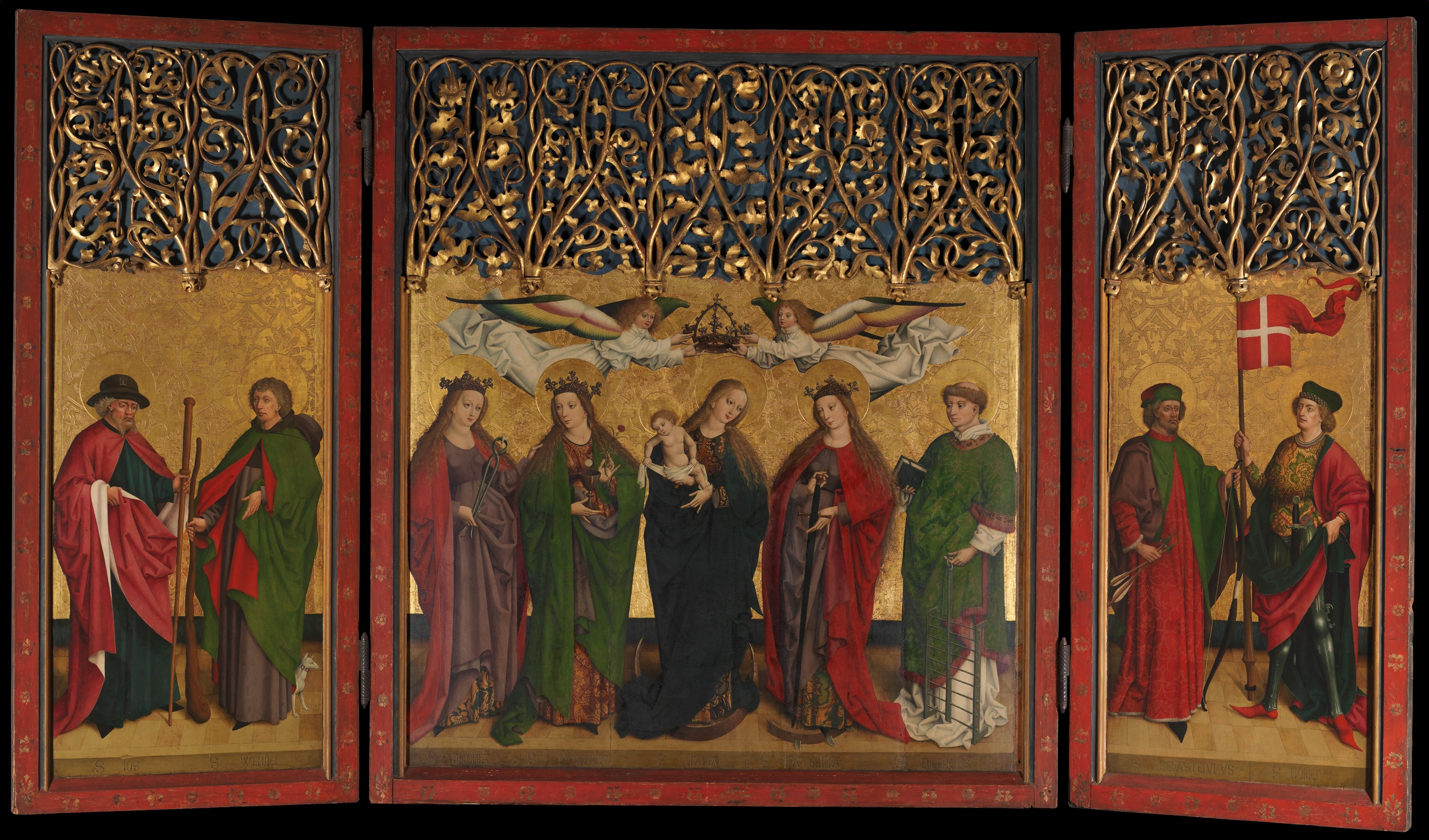
- Year: c. 1470
- Medium: oil paint, gold leaf, wood
- Dimensions: 174 cm (69 in) × 152.4 cm (60.0 in)
- Location: Metropolitan Museum of Art
- Accession No.: 53.21
- Identifiers: The Met object ID: 471455

The Burg Weiler Altar Triptych (Altarpiece with the Virgin and Child and Saints) or Master of the Burg Weiler Altar is a 1470 religious painting. It is in the collection of the Metropolitan Museum of Art. The altarpiece is Middle Rhenish, made in North Württemberg (now Baden-Württemberg). It was originally in the chapel of the castle of Burg Weiler near Heilbronn.

The triptych is oil on wood of three parts, with a gold ground. The left and right panels are each 68.5 inches (1,740 mm) by 26 inches (660 mm), and the middle panel is 68.5 inches (1,740 mm) by 60 inches (1,500 mm).

The work depicts Mary, Jesus Christ, Judoc, Wendelin of Trier, Saint Apollonia, Saint Barbara, Catherine of Alexandria, Lawrence of Rome, Saint Sebastian, Saint Maurice, and an angel.
