= Judoc =

Breton noble and Orthodox and Catholic saint

Saint Judoc
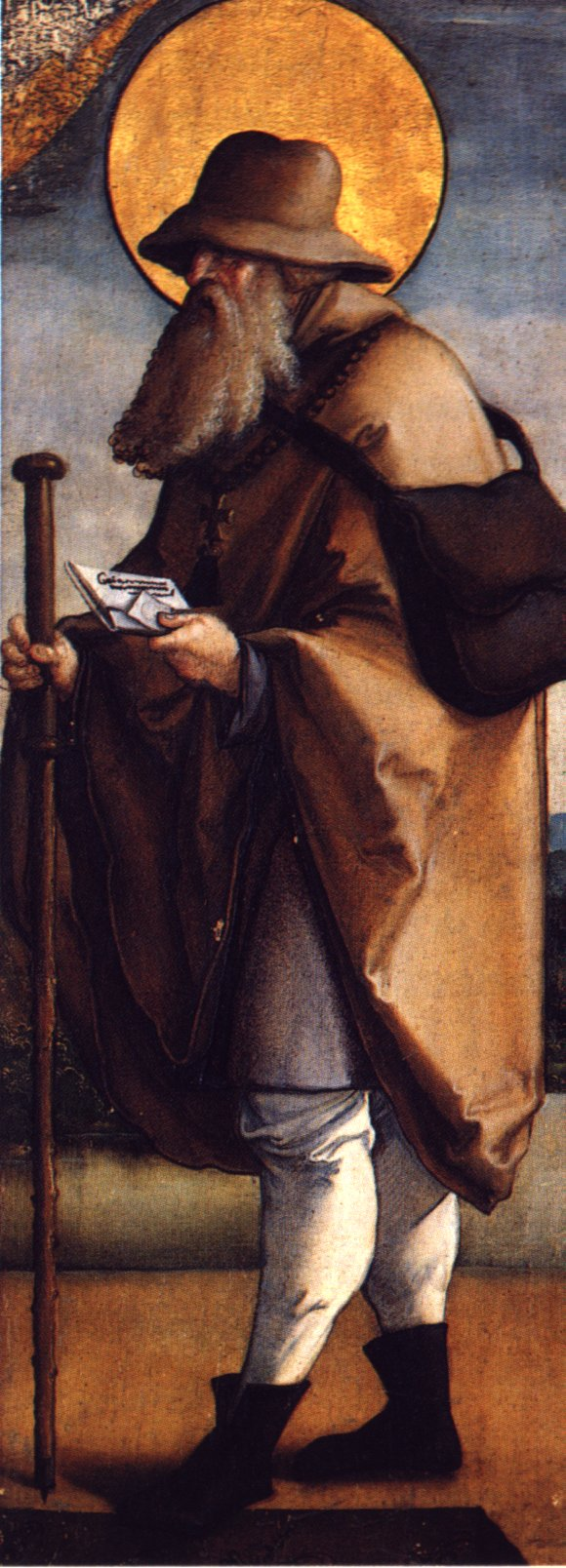
- A 16th-century portrayal of Saint Judoc by the Master of Meßkirch.
- Born: Brittany
- Died: 668 AD; Ponthieu, France
- Venerated in: Catholic Church, Eastern Orthodox Church January 22 / January 9.
- Major shrine: Abbey of Saint-Josse (original); New Minster, Winchester (destroyed)
- Feast: 13 December; 9 January (translation)
- Attributes: pilgrim's staff; a crown at his feet

Saint Judoc, otherwise known as Jodoc, Joyce or Josse (Latin: Iudocus; traditionally c. 600 – 668 AD) was a seventh-century Breton noble considered to be a saint. Judoc was a son of Juthael, King of Brittany. He renounced his wealth and position to become a priest and lived alone for the rest of his lifetime in the coastal forest near the mouth of the River Canche.

== Etymology ==
The name Judoc, meaning "Lord", is the 14th century Breton version of Iudocus in Latin, Josse in French, Jost, Joost, or Joos in Dutch, and Joyce in English. The name Judoc was rarely used after the 14th century except in the Netherlands.

== Biography ==
According to tradition, Judoc was the son of Juthael, King of Brittany, and the brother of Saint Judicael and Saint Winnoc. In approximately 636, Judoc renounced his inheritance and wealth and embarked on a pilgrimage to Rome. He was ordained as a priest during this journey and became chaplain to the lord of Ponthieu. After seven years, Judoc became a hermit at a place later called Saint-Josse-sur-Mer, where he resided until his death. According to ancient folklore, his body was said to be incorruptible, leaving his followers with the task of continually cutting his hair after death.

== Veneration ==
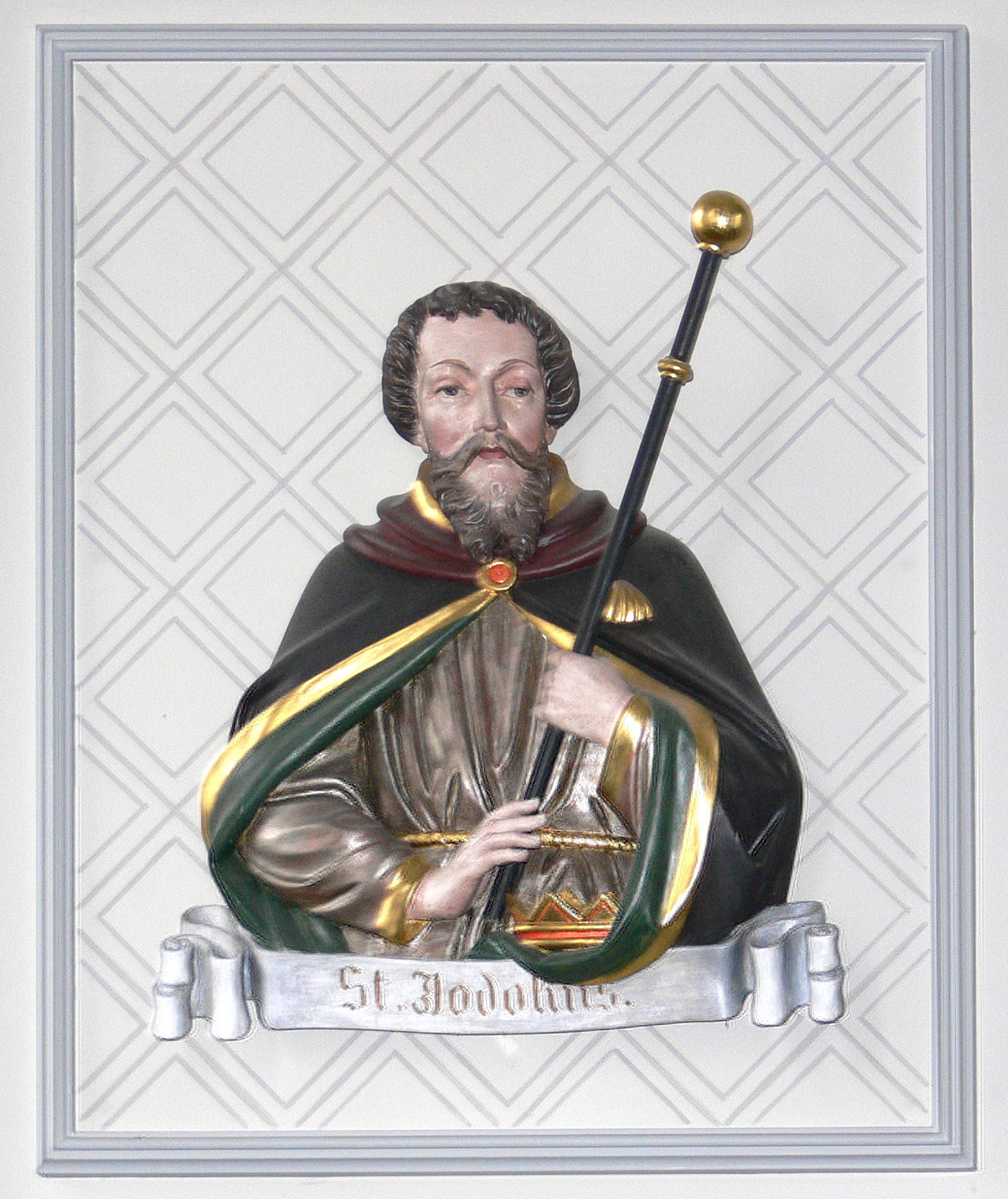
St. Judoc, as depicted in the Church of St. Christina in Ravensburg.

Saint Judoc developed a local cultus. Built in the eighth century at the place where Judoc's shrine was kept, the Abbey of Saint-Josse was a small monastery situated on the site of his retreat. In 903, some monks of the abbey fled Norman raiders for England, where they bore Judoc's relics, which were enshrined in the newly built New Minster in Winchester. To honor the event, feasts were held on 9 January.

The veneration of Judoc spread from France through the Low Countries, England, Germany, and Scandinavia. In these regions, variations of Josse, Joyce, Joos, Joost, and the diminutive Jocelyn, became popular names for both men and women, and a number of chapels and churches were dedicated to him.

The mal Saint-Josse was the term for an illness resulting from a snakebite, against which the saint's name was invoked by the fifteenth-century French poet Eustache Deschamps in an imprecatory ballade: "...Du mau saint Leu, de l'esvertin, Du saint Josse et saint Matelin... soit maistre Mahieu confondus!". According to Alban Butler, Charlemagne gave the abbey to Alcuin who turned it into a hostel for those crossing the English Channel. It later became a site of pilgrimage, especially popular with Flemings and Germans in the fourteenth and fifteenth centuries.

La vie de Saint Josse was written in Old French verses by the poet and translator Pierre de Beauvais in the thirteenth century.

The Suaire de St-Josse, or "Shroud of Saint Judoc," is a rich, silk samite saddlecloth that was woven in northeastern Iran prior to 961. When Saint Judoc was reinterred in 1134, the shroud was used to wrap his bones. The Louvre Museum currently houses his shroud.

The abbey was closed in 1772, and subsequently sold and dismantled in 1789, leaving no traces of the buildings. The abbey church then became the parish church of the French commune of Saint-Josse. In the village church (dedicated to St. Peter) is the shrine of Saint Josse, containing his relics.

== Cultural depictions ==
Cultural depictions usually portray Judoc holding the pilgrim's staff. He is also shown with a crown at his feet, referring to his renunciation of his lands and fortune. In Austria, there is a depiction of Judoc on the mausoleum of Maximilian in Innsbruck. Judoc was most famously mentioned by Chaucer's Wife of Bath, who swears "by God and by Seint Joce [Saint Joyce]." This suggests that his name was often invoked in oaths.

== See also ==
- Joyce (name)
