= Ali ibn Sahl Isfahani =

Abolhassan Ali ebn-e Sahl Azhar Esfahani (Arabic: أبوالحسن علي بن سهل الأصفهاني) was a Persian mystic. He lived in the era of Abbasid Caliph Al-Mu'tadid and died in 894 in Isfahan. According to Spencer, he founded the first khanqah. His khanqah still exists and is also his mausoleum.
