= Ghushkhaneh garden =

Historic garden in Isfahan, Iran

Coordinates: 32°41′03″N 51°41′18.8″E

The Ghushkhaneh garden (Persian: باغ‌ قوشخانه) is a historic garden in Isfahan, Iran. The garden was built during the reign of Abbas the Great (r. 1587–1629). In the Safavid era, the ceremony of samite confessing of the shah took place here.

== Etymology ==
The word Ghushkhaneh consists of two words: Ghush and Khaneh. Ghush (quş) is an Azeri word and means "bird", Khaneh is a Persian word (also used in Azeri) and means house or home. The name of the garden is Ghushkhaneh because, in the Safavid era, the shah's falcons were kept here.
