= Ali ebn-e Sahl Mausoleum =

9th century burial site in Isfahan, Iran

- Location of the masoleum in Iran

Religion
- Affiliation: Islam
- Ecclesiastical or organizational status: Mausoleum
- Status: Active
- Dedication: Abolhassan Ali ebn-e Sahl Azhar Esfahani

Location
- Location: Esfahan, Toghchi district, Isfahan province
- Country: Iran
- Interactive map of Ali ebn-e Sahl Mausoleum
- Coordinates: 32°40′47″N 51°41′29″E

Architecture
- Type: Islamic architecture
- Completed: 9th century CE

The Ali ebn-e Sahl Mausoleum is an Islamic mausoleum in Esfahan, in the province of Isfahan, Iran. The mystic Abolhassan Ali ebn-e Sahl Azhar Esfahani lived in the era of the Al-Mu'tadid, the Abbasid caliph. He had a khanqah and a school in the north of the Toghchi cemetery. He died in 894 CE in Isfahan and was buried in his khanqah.

The Ali ebn-e Sahl Mausoleum became a meeting place of mystics and dervishes. At present the mausoleum belongs to the Khaksari dervishes. The mausoleum has a vast garden; the larger part of which is under the possession of the Welfare Organisation.

== Description ==
Ali ebn-e Sahl's grave is located in the middle of the cross-shaped building. The gravestone is quadrilateral and is 2 metres (6 ft 7 in) long and 120 centimetres (47 in) high; and it has been decorated with yellow, white, blue and black tiles that contain the names of Ali and Mohammad. There are also other gravestones in the structure.

The mausoleum is open to visitors every day except Thursday afternoon.

== See also ==
- List of mausoleums in Iran
- List of the historical structures in the Isfahan province
