= Toghchi district =

Ancient burial area in Iran

Coordinates: 32°40′33″N 51°41′24″E

The Toghchi district is a district in the north of Isfahan with ancient origin. Before the islamization of Persian Empire, the district was located out of the city near the Yahoudieh gate. After the invasion of Arabs in the Persian Empire and during the capture of Isfahan, some of the killed soldiers of the Islamic army were buried in this area. During the reign of Buyid dynasty, Toghchi district expanded within its fortification and a gate was built to the west of district's cemetery. In the course of time, the cemetery was extended and in the 9th and 10th century, notable personalities were buried there. This cemetery is the second vastest cemetery of Isfahan after Takht-e Foulad.
