= Suaire de Saint-Josse =

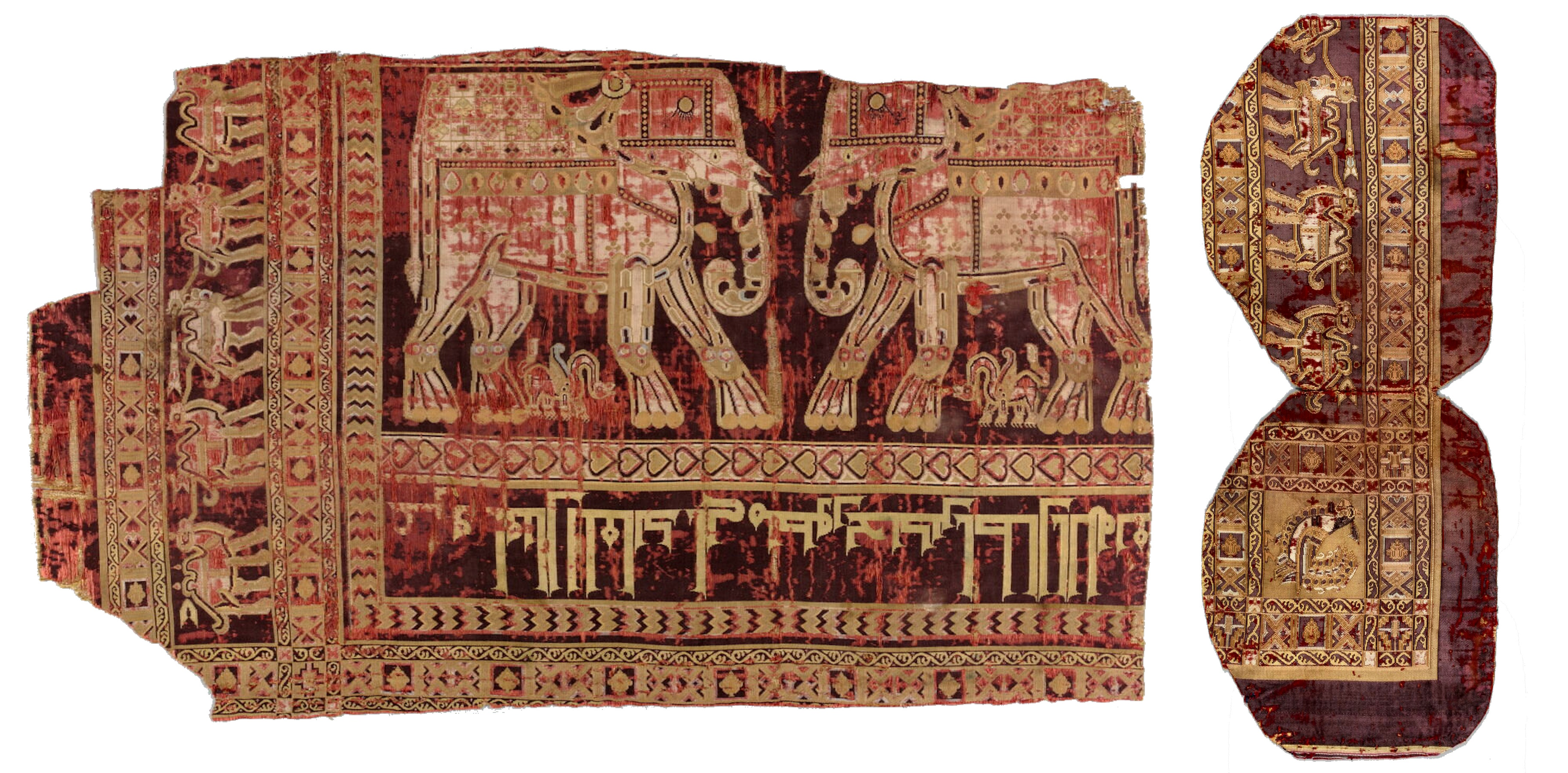
Silk textile made for Samanid general Abū‘l-Mansūr Bukhtegīn (d. 961), known as the ‘Suaire de Saint-Josse’, Paris, Louvre, OA 7502.

The Suaire de Saint-Josse, the "Shroud of Saint Josse" that is now conserved in the Musée du Louvre, is a rich silk samite saddle cloth that was woven in northeastern Iran, some time before 961 C.E., when the Samanid Empire general Abu Mansur Bakhtegin, the "camel-prince" for whom it was woven, was beheaded. It was brought back from the First Crusade by Étienne de Blois and dedicated as a votive gift at the Abbey of Saint-Josse, near Boulogne-sur-Mer, Pas-de-Calais. It has been described as "the major landmark in early Islamic silk weaving".

This fragmentary textile with elephants woven into the design is the only known surviving example of a silk textile produced in Eastern Iran, in the royal workshops of the Samanid dynasty, probably at either Merv or Nishapur. The primary decoration on the surviving fragments consists of a pair of confronted elephants within a rectangular border filled with geometric designs. Below the feet of each elephant is another creature, perhaps a dragon. Bands of marching bactrian camels surround the central field, with a cock set in each corner, and below the confronted elephants is an inscription. The inscription reads, "glory and prosperity to the commander, Abu Mansur Bakhtikin, may God prolong his existence". The "prince" referred to in the woven Kufic inscription, though decipherable in more than one way, most likely refers to the general and emir Bukhtegin, active in the service of 'Abd al-Malik I, the Samanid sultan of Khorasan, 954-61 C.E.

The cloth is now in two fragments, which are regarded as comprising about half of the original piece. They are 52 x 94 cm and 24.5 x 62 cm respectively, the first measurement being the length. The weaving method utilized in the Shroud of Saint Josse is the samite technique, which is structured with six threads, which had developed in Iran in the first centuries C.E. The warp is red and the weft is composed of seven colors: plum, yellow, ivory, sky blue, light brown, copper and golden brown, although the last three have faded over the centuries to a light brown or beige.

Like many trophies of foreign adventure, both in the Middle Ages and in more modern times, in its new context, the rare textile was given new meaning, for it was used to wrap the bones of Saint Josse when he was reinterred in 1134. It is unclear how the textile was originally used.

The Abbey of Saint-Josse was closed in 1772, and the buildings were sold and demolished after the French Revolution, in 1791. No trace is left of the monumental buildings. The suaire was acquired by the Louvre in 1922.
