= Samite =

Silk fabric

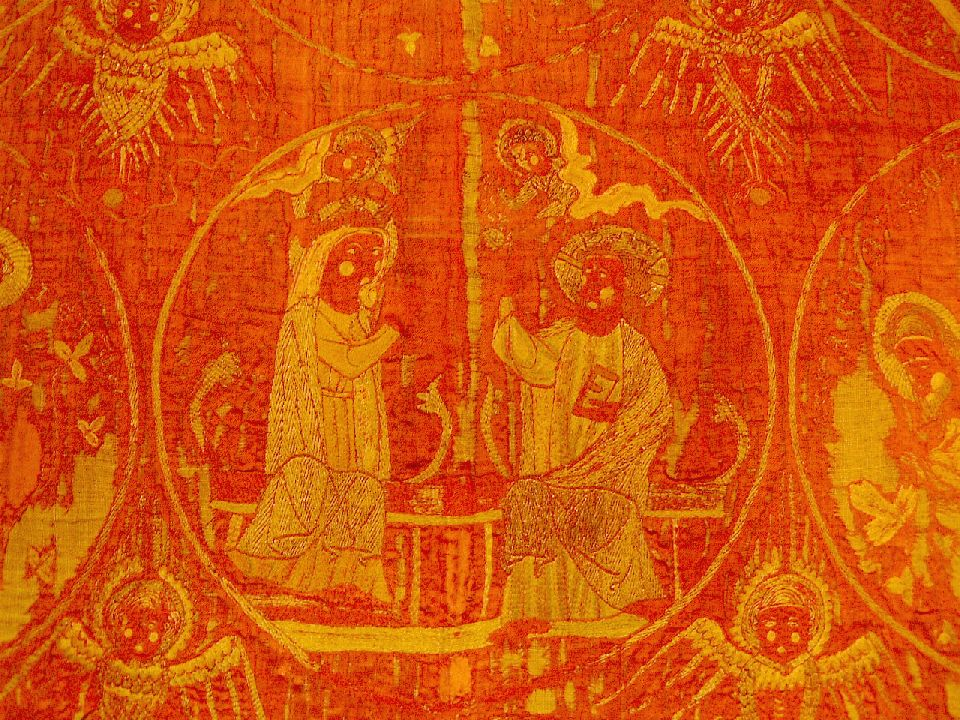
Detail from the "Martyr Cope" (1270), gold on red silk samite, brought from France in 1274. Uppsala Cathedral Treasury.

Samite was a luxurious and heavy silk fabric worn in the Middle Ages, of a twill-type weave, often including gold or silver thread. The name "samite" derives from Old French samit, from medieval Latin samitum, examitum deriving from the Byzantine Greek ἑξάμιτον hexamiton, meaning "six threads", usually interpreted as indicating the use of six yarns in the warp. Samite continues in use in ecclesiastical robes, vestments, ornamental fabrics, and interior decoration.

Structurally, samite is a weft-faced compound twill, plain or figured (patterned), in which the main warp threads are hidden on both sides of the fabric by the floats of the ground and patterning wefts, with only the binding warps visible. By the later medieval period, the term samite applied to any rich, heavy silk material which had a satin-like gloss, indeed "satin" began as a term for lustrous samite.

== Origins and westward spread ==
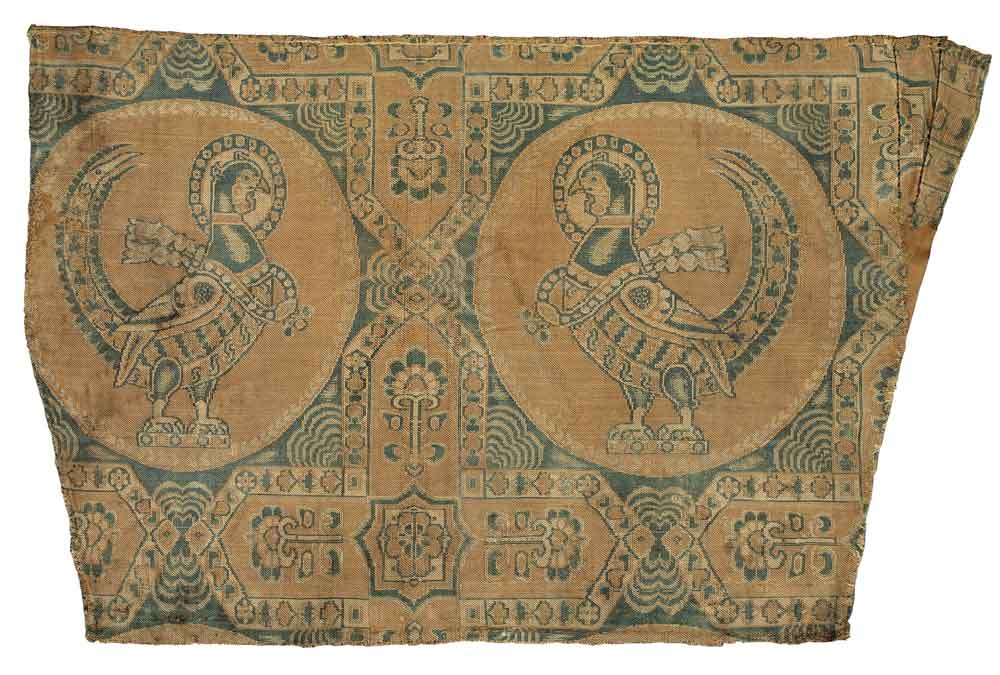
Pheasant roundels on silk samite fragment, Central Asia, 7th or 8th century

Fragments of samite have been discovered at many locations along the Silk Road, and are especially associated with the Sasanian Empire. Samite was "arguably the most important" silk weave of Byzantium, and from the 9th century Byzantine silks entered Western Europe via the trading ports in what is now Italy. Vikings, connected through their direct trade routes with Constantinople, were buried in samite embroidered with silver-wound threads in the tenth century. Silk weaving itself was established in Lucca and Venice in the 12th and 13th centuries, and the statutes of the silk-weaving guilds in Venice specifically distinguished sammet weavers from weavers of other types of silk cloth.

The Crusades brought the Franks or Latins of Western Europe into direct contact with the Muslim world and other sources of samite as well as other Eastern luxuries. A samite saddlecloth known in the West as the Suaire de Saint-Josse, now in the Musée du Louvre, was woven in eastern Iran sometime before 961, when Abu Mansur Bakhtegin, for whom it was woven, died; it was brought back from the First Crusade by Stephen, Count of Blois and dedicated as a votive gift at the Abbey of Judoc near Boulogne. At the time of the First Crusade, samite needed to be explained to a Western audience, as in the eye-witness Chanson d'Antioche (ccxxx): "Very quickly he took a translator and a large dromedary loaded with silver cloth, called "samite" in our language. He sent them to our fine, brave men..."

The Fourth Crusade brought riches unknown in the West to the crusaders who sacked Constantinople in 1204, described by Villehardouin: "The booty gained was so great that none could tell you the end of it: gold and silver, and vessels and precious stones, and samite, and cloth of silk..."

== Use in medieval Europe ==
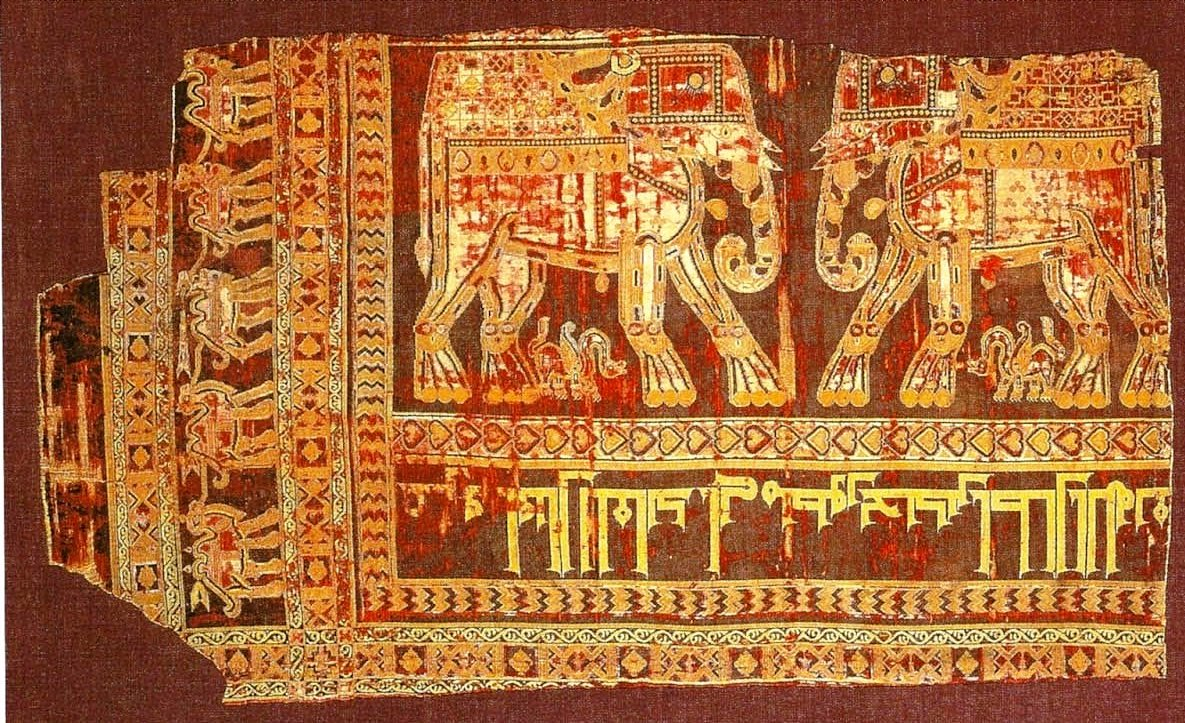
Sasanian silk samite cloth circa 960. It was used to make the Shroud of Saint-Josse, circa 1134. Probable spoils from the First Crusade.

Samite was a royal tissue: in the 1250s, it featured clothing of fitting status provided for the innovative and style-conscious English king Henry III, his family, and his attendants. For those of royal blood, there were robes and mantles of samite and cloth of gold. Samite might be interwoven with threads wrapped in gold foil. It could be further enriched by being over-embroidered: in Chrétien de Troyes' Perceval, the Story of the Grail (1180s) "On the altar, I assure you, there lay a slain knight. Over him was spread a rich, dyed samite cloth, embroidered with many golden flowers, and before him burned a single candle, no more, no less." In manuscript illuminations, modern readers often interpret rich figurative designs as embroidered, but Barbara Gordon points out that they could equally be painted and illustrates a samite mitre painted grisaille in the Cleveland Museum of Art. According to the Louvre, the most famous example of painted silk, the Parement of Narbonne, despite being a royal commission, was only made on "fluted silk imitating samite".

In the wrong hands, samite could threaten the outward marks of social stability; samite was specified among the luxuries forbidden to the urban middle classes in sumptuary laws by the court of René of Anjou about 1470: "In cities mercantile governments outlawed crowns, trains, cloth of samite and precious metals, ermine trims, and other pretensions of aristocratic fashion." In Florence, when the condottiero Walter VI, Count of Brienne offered the innovation of a sumptuous feast to John the Baptist in 1343, the chronicler Giovanni Villani noted among the rich trappings "He added to the other side of the palio of crimson samite cloth a trim of gray squirrel skin as long as the pole."

== See also ==
- Coptic textiles
- Sampul tapestry
- Sichuan embroidery
- Sogdian textiles
