= Saint-Josse =

- Commune
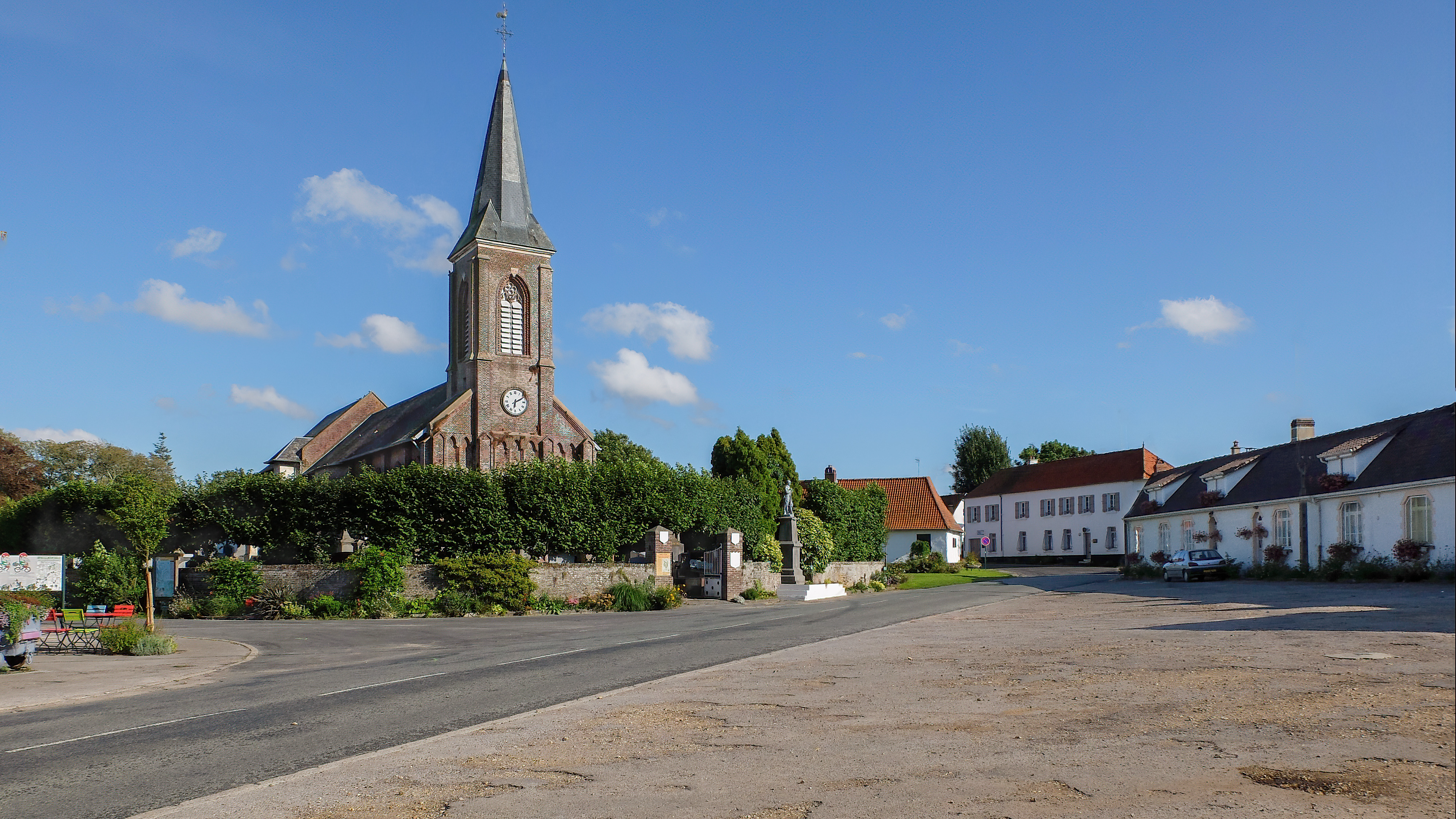
- The church of Saint-Josse

- Coat of arms
- Location of Saint-Josse
- Location within France Location within Hauts-de-France
- Coordinates: 50°28′07″N 1°39′56″E
- Country: France
- Region: Hauts-de-France
- Department: Pas-de-Calais
- Arrondissement: Montreuil
- Canton: Étaples
- Intercommunality: CA Deux Baies en Montreuillois

Government
  - Mayor (2020–2026): Jean-Claude Descharles
- Area^{1}: 21.1 km^{2} (8.1 sq mi)
- Elevation: 8 m (26 ft)
- Highest elevation: 64 m (210 ft)
- Lowest elevation: 2 m (6.6 ft)
- Population (2023): 1,041
  - Density: 49.3/km^{2} (128/sq mi)
- Time zone: UTC+01:00 (CET)
  - Summer (DST): UTC+02:00 (CEST)
- INSEE/Postal code: 62752 /62170
- ^{1} French Land Register data, which excludes lakes, ponds, glaciers > 1 km^{2} (0.386 sq mi or 247 acres) and river estuaries.

Saint-Josse (French pronunciation: [sɛ̃ ʒɔs]), or Saint-Josse-sur-Mer (literally Saint-Josse on Sea), is a commune in the Pas-de-Calais department in the Hauts-de-France region of France 4 miles (6 km) west of Montreuil-sur-Mer.

== Population ==
Historical population
Year	Pop.	±% p.a.
1968	559	—
1975	575	+0.40%
1982	671	+2.23%
1990	914	+3.94%
1999	1,052	+1.57%
2007	1,194	+1.60%
2012	1,167	−0.46%
2017	1,136	−0.54%
2023	1,041	−1.44%
Source: INSEE

== Transport ==
Saint-Josse was formerly served by a station on the Longueau–Boulogne railway.

== See also ==
Communes of the Pas-de-Calais department
